= Virtual Fishing =

1995 video game

- Developer: Locomotive Corporation
- Publisher: Pack-In-Video
- Director: Makoto Hijiya
- Producer: Tomio Kanazawa
- Designer: Toshiaki Kamiya
- Programmer: Shinji Aoyama
- Artists: Chiho Tomita; Rie Ikeuti; Sayaka Takeda
- Composer: Akiko Hida
- Platform: Virtual Boy
- Release: JP: October 6, 1995
- Genre: Fishing
- Mode: Single-player

Virtual Fishing (Note: Japanese: バーチャルフィッシング, Hepburn: Bācharu Fisshingu) is a 1995 fishing video game developed by Locomotive Corporation and published by Pack-In-Video in Japan for the Virtual Boy. The player participates in a series of fishing tournaments at various different locations by catching a large number of fishes with a high average weight under a time limit. Its gameplay consists of two segments and features two additional modes of play.

Co-headed by director Makoto Hijiya and producer Tomio Kanazawa, Virtual Fishing was created by most of the staff who previously created V-Tetris under the supervision of Bullet-Proof Software and would later work on SD Gundam Dimension War. After its Japanese launch, plans for an international release were underway by THQ, but the North American localization was ultimately never published. The game is considered a sought-after item on the game collecting market. It garnered mixed reception from gaming publications upon release, and retrospective commentary has been similarly mixed. While the game hasn't been officially released outside Japan, an English fan translation exists.

== Gameplay ==
Screenshot of the first gameplay segment

Virtual Fishing is a fishing game where the player participates in one of the three available gameplay modes. Prior to starting, the player can input their name and gender. The first is a tournament mode, where the main objective of the player is to advance in a series of fishing tournaments at six different locations by catching a large number of fishes with a high average weight under a time limit. Only two locations are available to choose when the player starts at the beginning, with more being unlocked via a winning qualification. Records are automatically saved on the cartridge.

Gameplay is broken into two segments (luring and reeling); in the first segment, the player casts their line into the water. When the lure lands in the water, the player can manipulate its movement by pressing the B button to entice a fish to bite it. The game enters into the second segment once a fish has bitten the lure, with the perspective changing from a first-person to a side-view, and the player has to reel it in carefully to avoid breaking the line. Qualifying a tournament also unlocks a second mode on the chosen location, "Time Attack", where the objective is to catch fish in the fastest time possible. The third mode, called "Free", allows the player to fish freely.

== Development and release ==
Virtual Fishing was developed by Locomotive Corporation, who previously collaborated with Nintendo to co-develop StarTropics (1990) and created V-Tetris (1995) under supervision of Bullet-Proof Software. Most of the staff who developed the game would later work on SD Gundam Dimension War. Development was co-headed by director Makoto Hijiya and producer Tomio Kanazawa. Toshiaki Kamiya acted as the game's planner with cooperation from Tooru Miyazawa. Shinji Aoyama served as the sole programmer, while the artwork was handled by Chiho Tomita. Rie Ikeuti and Sayaka Takeda were responsible for the pixel art, while the music was composed by Akiko Hida. Like all other Virtual Boy games, Virtual Fishing sports a red-and-black color scheme and uses parallax to simulate 3D, and stereoscopic visuals to create the illusion of depth.

Virtual Fishing was announced at E3 1995. The game was originally slated for a September 29, 1995 release by Pack-In-Video in Japan, but was published on October 6 instead and was housed in an eight megabit cartridge. After its launch, the title was also showcased in a playable state at the 1995 Famimaga Earth World show. Due to reportedly not selling well, copies of the game are sought after by collectors and command high prices on the secondary game-collecting market. In early 1996, Nintendo Power reported that the game would receive a North American localization by THQ, slated for a winter 1996 launch, but this iteration was never released.

On May 14, 2026, Virtual Fishing was re-released for the Nintendo Switch through the Nintendo Classics service in Japan.

== Reception ==
Reception

Review scores
Publication	Score
Famitsu	6/10, 5/10, 5/10, 3/10
N64 Magazine	44%
Nintendo Life	5/10

Virtual Fishing garnered mixed reception from gaming publications since its release. Famitsu's four reviewers gave the game a mixed outlook, criticizing several aspects. British magazine Nintendo Magazine System labeled the title as "totally and utterly rubbish", recommending it only to fishing enthusiasts. The Japanese book Virtual Boy Memorial Commemorative Guidebook gave it an average rating, stating that "it's rather nice to play in bed before falling asleep." N64 Magazine's Jason Moore called it an "inactive game", questioning Nintendo for choosing to release the title on a system reliant on 3D hardware.

Retrospective commentary for Virtual Fishing have been equally mixed. Nintendo Life's Dave Frear criticized the game for its repetitive and "irritating" music, visual presentation and gameplay. However, Frear commended the addition of a second mode of play after winning a competition and save system. Gavin Lane, also of Nintendo Life, wrote that its difficulty "struggles to find the right balance" and ranked it among the lower half of the system's library. Retro Gamer criticized the title for its graphics, animations and stereoscopic 3D effect, while remarking that "its biggest problem is that it's just not exciting to play." Retronauts writer Jeremy Parish found that the 3D effect did not improve its core gameplay.
