= V-Tetris =

1995 video game

- Developer: Locomotive
- Publisher: Bullet-Proof Software
- Director: Norifumi Hara
- Producer: Takehiro Moriyama
- Designer: Toshiaki Kamiya
- Programmer: Yuji Hatanaka
- Artist: Tomonori Matsunaga
- Composer: Takashi Kumegawa
- Series: Tetris
- Platform: Virtual Boy
- Release: JP: August 25, 1995
- Genre: Puzzle
- Mode: Single-player

V-Tetris (Note: Japanese: V・テトリス, Hepburn: Bī・Tetorisu; also known as Virtual Tetris) is a 1995 puzzle video game developed by Locomotive and published by Bullet-Proof Software in Japan for the Virtual Boy. Its gameplay involves the player clearing horizontal lines by moving pieces of different shapes that descend onto the playing field by filling empty spaces in order to make completed lines disappear and gain points across three modes of play. It is the first of two Tetris games released for the Virtual Boy, followed by 3D Tetris in 1996.

Designed by Toshiaki Kamiya and headed by Takehiro Moriyama, V-Tetris was developed under supervision of Bullet-Proof Software by staff at Locomotive Corporation who would later work on both Virtual Fishing and SD Gundam Dimension War, with the team wanting the game to feel fresh and new with its additional content while keeping the familiarity of the original Tetris. BPS felt that producing a Tetris game for the Virtual Boy would appeal to a wider audience and wanted to keep the game's simplicity to respect the original's legacy. Gameplay was altered to make use of the system's 3D hardware capabilities to create a sense of depth. It was intended to be released as a launch title and feature support for the then-upcoming Link Cable peripheral, which was never released due to the console's short lifespan. V-Tetris was met with mixed reception from critics.

== Gameplay ==
Gameplay screenshot of type-C mode

V-Tetris is a falling-tile puzzle game similar to previous Tetris titles on other platforms with three modes of play. In type-A mode, the player must clear horizontal lines by moving pieces of different shapes that descend onto the playing field by filling empty spaces in order to make completed lines disappear and gain as many points as possible, while avoiding having the playfield full and the game's speed increases after clearing every ten lines.

In type-B mode, the player is required to clear a determined number of horizontal lines with pieces filling the playfield and proceed to the next level. In type-C mode, called "Loop Tetris", the player can scroll the cylindrical-esque playing field left or right by pressing the L and R buttons respectively and clear multiple horizontal lines.

== Development and release ==
V-Tetris was developed under supervision of Bullet-Proof Software by staff at Locomotive Corporation who would later work on both Virtual Fishing and SD Gundam Dimension War, with Toshiaki Kamiya acting as designer. Production was headed by Takehiro Moriyama alongside co-directors Norifumi Hara and Makoto Hijiya, while Hijiya also acted with Yuji Hatanaka as co-programmer. The visuals were designed by Tomonori Matsunaga, while both sound effects and music were made by Takashi Kumegawa. Bullet-Proof public relations spokesperson Tanaka Shutsuho recounted the project's development process in a 1995 interview with Japanese magazine 3D Virtual Boy Magazine, stating that BPS felt that making a Tetris title for the Virtual Boy would appeal to a wider audience and wanted to maintain simplicity in order to "respect" the legacy of the original game, while gameplay was altered to make use of the console's 3D hardware capabilities to create a sense of depth. The team wanted the game to feel fresh and new with added content but keeping the familiarity of the original Tetris.

V-Tetris was announced at E3 1995 under the working title V1-Tetris. The game was intended to be released as a launch title and feature support for the then-upcoming Link Cable peripheral, which was never released due to the short lifespan of the Virtual Boy. The title was released by Bullet-Proof Software in Japan on August 25 of the same year and was housed in a four megabit cartridge. Though it was never officially released in North America, copies of the game were imported by Electronics Boutique in 1996 and sold alongside other Japanese-exclusive titles for the console, while all the in-game text is in English.

V-Tetris received its first official western release when it was added to the Nintendo Classics service on May 14, 2026

== Reception ==
Reception

Review scores
Publication	Score
Famitsu	7/10, 5/10, 5/10, 4/10
Nintendo Life	7/10
Nintendojo	7.5/10

V-Tetris received a mixture of opinions from critics prior to and since its release, though retrospective reviewers gave it a positive recommendation. Famitsu's four reviewers gave the game a very mixed analysis. The Japanese book Virtual Boy Memorial Commemorative Guidebook gave the title a low overall rating. Nintendojo's Nathan Heckel felt that the elven motiv could be "disturbing" for players over 10 and that the type-C mode did not take avantage of the system's 3D capabilities. However, Heckel referred to the latter mode as "mind-bending" due to the ability of rotate between stacks and scoring opportunities but regarded its gameplay to be standard and remarked that the music did not compare to previous Tetris games. Nintendo Life's Dave Frear stated that "V-Tetris gains absolutely nothing from being on the Virtual Boy as the 3D effect is only really used for the backgrounds. The music could have been better and it's harmed by not having a save feature for the high scores. However it's still Tetris, which is as simple and addictive as it's ever been and mode C is excellent."

== See also ==
- 3D Tetris
- List of Virtual Boy games
