= Virtual Bowling =

1995 video game

- Developer: Athena
- Publisher: Athena
- Producer: Sakae Nakamura
- Composer: Ryoue Takagi
- Platform: Virtual Boy
- Release: JP: December 22, 1995
- Genre: Sports
- Mode: Single-player

Virtual Bowling (Note: Japanese: バーチャルボウリング, Hepburn: Bācharu Bōringu) is a 1995 sports video game developed and published by Athena in Japan for the Virtual Boy. In the game, the player participates in a series of bowling tournaments consisting of four 10-frame matches at various alleys against computer-controlled opponents, in order to obtain a high score and progress further. Its gameplay, featuring three modes of play, is viewed from a first-person perspective.

Virtual Bowling was created by Athena, a developer known for their bowling games, with producer Sakae Nakamura heading its development. The game was reportedly rushed to market amid Nintendo planning to cease support for the Virtual Boy, becoming one of the platform's last official Japanese titles alongside Bandai's SD Gundam Dimension War, and was produced under a very limited run. It is considered by gaming journalists as one of the rarest, most valuable and sought-after Virtual Boy titles.

Virtual Bowling garnered mixed reception from gaming publications since its release; criticism was geared toward the odd physics, lack of multiplayer and unbalanced scoring mechanics, but its sense of realism, playability and use of the Virtual Boy's hardware were commended. Retrospective commentary has been more positive, with some considering it one of the best games for the platform, being praised for its 3D visuals, controls, fast-paced tournament mode and use of the system's hardware.

== Gameplay ==
Gameplay screenshot

Virtual Bowling is an arcade-style sports game similar to World Bowling on Game Boy, where the player participates in one of three modes of play available: Standard, Training and Tournament. Standard is a quick match mode, where the player attempts to knock 10 pins under 10 frames. Training, as the name implies, is a practice mode where the player can place pins at any position before making a shot. In the Tournament mode, the player participates in a series of four matches consisting of 10 frames at various alleys against computer-controlled opponents, in order to obtain a high score and progress further. Prior to starting, the player can input their name and adjust various settings such as the ball's weight, amount of wax to apply at the lane's surface or a dominant arm.

Gameplay is viewed from a first-person perspective; the player adjusts their position and aim using the left and right d-pads. Afterwards, the player is presented with spin and power gauges, which determines how the ball will go and how hard the ball is thrown. The power gauge is split into two phases, with the first part determining the ball's power, and the player must match a circle spot during the second part to pull off a shot. However, the ball can veer off the lane if the player fails to match the spot during this second phase. Once the ball is released, the camera follows it through the lane before knocking the pins.

== Development and release ==
Virtual Bowling was developed by Athena, a game developer known for their experience with bowling titles such as World Bowling (1990) for Game Boy. Development was headed by producer Sakae Nakamura, while the music was co-composed by Ryoue Takagi and a member only known by the pseudonym of "Nicochimans". The game was first previewed in June 1995, prior to the launch of the platform, in a Virtual Boy-dedicated supplement of Family Computer Magazine and later in July on the Japanese magazine The Super Famicom respectively. Like all other Virtual Boy games, the title sports a red-and-black color scheme and uses stereoscopic 3D visuals to create the illusion of depth. It was first showcased to the video game press and attendees at the 1995 Consumer Soft Group (CSG) trade show and later at Shoshinkai 1995.

Following a final call issued by Nintendo regarding Virtual Boy releases before ceasing support for the system, Athena, alongside Bandai, J-Wing and Taito, reportedly rushed their titles to market in order to recoup investment. Virtual Bowling was originally slated for a December 8 launch by Athena, but was published on December 22 instead and was housed in an eight megabit cartridge. It served as one of the last official Japanese Virtual Boy games published alongside SD Gundam Dimension War, also released on the same day. It is considered by gaming journalists as one of the rarest, most valuable and sought-after Virtual Boy titles; It became a rare collector's item that commands high prices on the secondary game collecting market, due to being produced under a very limited run of copies. Though it was never released in North America, all the in-game text is displayed in English. Some hobbyists load the ROM image onto actual Virtual Boy cartridges and sell reproduction copies online.

Virtual Bowling was added to the Nintendo Classics service on May 14, 2026, marking its first western release.

== Reception ==
Reception

Review scores
Publication	Score
Famitsu	6/5/6/5 (Note: Each of the four reviewers in Famitsu scored the game on a ten point scale.)
Nintendo Life	7/10

Virtual Bowling received mixed reception from gaming publications since its release. Famitsu's four reviewers criticized the game for its "odd" physics, lack of multiplayer and unbalanced scoring mechanics. However, they commended its sense of realism, playability and use of the Virtual Boy's qualities. The Japanese book Virtual Boy Memorial Commemorative Guidebook gave the title an average rating, stating that "It's pretty good, as long as you don't think about why you should take the trouble to bowl with this hardware." In contrast to the other publicacions, a writer for British magazine Retrogames was more positive towards the game, giving positive remarks to the visuals for making good use of the Virtual Boy's hardware, and the skittle sprites for their animations and realistic physics, while finding the sound to be "chirpy". The writer stated that the game was "a refreshing return to a simple yet addictive gaming format" and regarded it as one of the best Virtual Boy titles.

Retrospective commentary for Virtual Bowling has been more positive, with some considering it one of the best games for the platform. Nintendo Life's Dave Frear found the game to be a "very impressive bowling sim", praising the 3D visuals, atmospheric sound, responsive controls, tournament mode and catchy music but also criticized this latter aspect for being repetitive, as well as the default power metter setting for enabling easy strikes and lack of a saving system to keep high scores. GamesTM considered it a fun and accessible bowling game, citing its simple controls and variety of game modes. They also noted that it made the great use of the Virtual Boy's hardware. Retro Gamer also commended its number of customizable options, detailed graphics and simple bowling system, regarding it as one of the best titles for the Virtual Boy. Retronauts writer Jeremy Parish called it one of the stronger titles for the Virtual Boy and found it to be better than Nester's Funky Bowling. Parish gave the game positive remarks for making subtle use of the system's hardware despite the premise, as well as its straightforward mechanics, fast-paced tournament mode and controls.
