= Gail Tilden =

American marketing manager and consultant

- Occupation: Advertising manager
- Known for: Nintendo Power

Gail Tilden is an American marketing manager and consultant. She formerly worked at Nintendo of America where she was instrumental in helping with the advertising of the Nintendo Entertainment System's introduction to the North American market, and establishing the Nintendo Power magazine.

== Career ==
=== Nintendo ===
Tilden joined Nintendo of America (NoA) in July 1983 and by September was named the Advertising Manager for the company. At this time, Nintendo was primarily focused on arcade games though had just released its first home console, the Famicom, in Japan. Within the United States, the video game market had just crashed, in part due to oversaturation of the market by unlicensed third-party games for the home consoles of the time. Nintendo waited for some time to bring the Famicom into the United States, and sought to position it to avoid the pitfalls that had led to the 1983 crash. Tilden was part of the team to figure out how to bring the system to U.S. to appeal to consumers while distancing it from the issues that led to the crash, with Tilden leading the public relations and advertising. Tilden, along with others, decided to initially launch the system - remodeled and rebranded as the Nintendo Entertainment System (NES) - in a limited test market of New York City in October 1985 to gauge reaction, and with additional test market releases in February 1986. This allowed them to figure out what games to pack in with the system for its full release later in 1986.

Following the NES's release, NoA found that there were players looking for help in trying to complete the new games. A long-time employee and spokesperson for NoA, Howard Phillips, established a phone help line for players to call in for people to get help, but believed there were other solutions for this. Phillips and Tilden decided to create the free Nintendo Fun Club newsletter as one means; players could join by filling out cards packed in with the NES games and mailing them back to NoA, and in return sent them the newsletter with gameplay tips and other information. At its peak, the newsletter had more than 600,000 subscribers, which became too costly to operate freely. This led to Phillips and Tilden to create Nintendo Power by 1988, a monthly magazine that provided similar tips for players as well as other related Nintendo news. Tilden served as the magazine's editor-in-chief in its early days.

Tilden was responsible for launching Nintendo's presence on the Internet in 1995, and was promoted to the Vice President of Brand Management for NoA in 1998. This also included managing many of the Nintendo intellectual property rights, including the Pokémon brand. She helped to seek other venues to bring Nintendo's IP, notably the Pokémon anime, so that it was consistent with the branding Nintendo wanted for the series, in contrast with the panned 1993 Super Mario Bros. film.

=== Post-Nintendo ===
Tilden left Nintendo in 2007 to work as a freelance consultant for startup companies.
