= Nester's Funky Bowling =

1996 video game

- Developer: Saffire
- Publisher: Nintendo of America
- Platform: Virtual Boy
- Release: NA: February 1996
- Genre: Sports
- Modes: Single-player, multiplayer

Nester's Funky Bowling is a bowling video game developed by Saffire and published by Nintendo for the Virtual Boy. It was only released in North America in February 1996, and was the second-to-last game released for the system before it was discontinued. Players control Nester, a character from the Nintendo Power comics, or his twin sister Hester, as they compete to see who is the superior bowler. It features standard bowling mechanics and rules, and has three modes of play - Bowling, Challenge, and Practice, all three supporting one or two players.

It has received generally mixed reception; while some found it to be a poor or average game, such as staff for IGN and GamePro, Nintendo Power and Allgame were more forgiving, toting it as a quality game compared to other titles in the Virtual Boy library. Its graphics received some recognition, though it was faulted for its lack of a save function and lack of game modes.

== Gameplay ==
Gameplay of Nester's Funky Bowling. It features the Virtual Boy's trademark red and black visuals.

Players control Nester, a character from the Nintendo Power magazine's comic section, or his twin sister Hester, as they attempt to prove their superiority over one another. Like all other Virtual Boy games, Nester's Funky Bowling uses a red-and-black color scheme and uses parallax, an optical trick that is used to simulate a 3D effect. There are four ranks that are achieved based on their score, which is based on normal bowling rules - the ranks are Beginner, Intermediate, Advanced, and Pro. Players may adjust their character in order to hit it how they like, such as using pins ricocheting or bouncing in order to knock more down.

There are three modes of play, all of which support one or two players. These include Bowling, Challenge, and Practice. In Bowling, players play a standard game of bowling. In Challenge, players must knock down all of the pins that appear with only once chance to do so as the pin set-ups become increasingly difficult. Players are given more points for knocking all of the pins down depending on the difficulty of the shot. In Practice, players may choose from 28 different pin variations. When playing with another player, players pass the Virtual Boy back and forth in between turns.

== Development ==
Nester's Funky Bowling was developed by Saffire Corporation and published by Nintendo for the Virtual Boy console. It was released exclusively in North America in February 1996.

== Reception ==
Reception

Review scores
Publication	Score
AllGame	3.5/5
Next Generation	2/5
The Daily Gazette	2/5

Nester's Funky Bowling received generally mixed reviews, selling poorly according to Joystiq writer Eric Caoili. Tony Brusqul for The Daily Gazette criticized the randomized and unrealistic behavior of the ball and pins, and suggested players looking for a bowling game play it on a different system, citing the eye pain incurred from playing. GamePro staff called it "challenging and fun at first", but found that it became easy after just a few games. They felt that the graphics improved the game, though adding that they became repetitive over time. Next Generation staff regarded it as one of the platform's most enjoyable games, citing its simple interface and non-intrusive visuals. In their review, Nintendo Power praised its gameplay, calling it "solid", as well as its modes of play. However, they criticized the two player mechanic, calling the method awkward. It was an editor's pick for Nintendo Power editors Scott, Dan, and Henry. They named it one of the top games released for the platform.

In a retrospective over of the Virtual Boy, Official Nintendo Magazine called it an average bowling game. GameSpy's Luke McKinney commented that the Virtual Boy's library consisting of "almost five percent" bowling games was a poor decision. Allgame's Scott Alan Marriott called it a fun game for the Virtual Boy, praising the graphics but bemoaning the lack of replay value due to few modes of play and no save function. Wired's Chris Kohler stated that Nester's Funky Bowling had increased in price over time.

== See also ==
- List of Virtual Boy games
- Virtual Bowling
