= Mobile Premier League =

Indian online gaming platform

- Type: Private
- Industry: Online gaming
- Founded: 2018; 8 years ago
- Founders: Sai Srinivas Kiran; Shubham Malhotra
- Headquarters: Bengaluru, Karnataka, India
- Area served: India, Europe, USA
- Revenue: ▲$104.63 million (FY23)
- Net income: ▼$–37 million (FY23)
- Owners: Galactus Funware Technology Pvt. Ltd
- Number of employees: 800 (2021)
- Website: www.mpl.live

Mobile Premier League (MPL) is an Indian online gaming platform. It is based in Bengaluru, India. Founded in 2018 by Srinivas Kiran and Shubham Malhotra, the company currently offers 60 games in categories such as fantasy sports, sports games, puzzle, casual and board games. MPL offers fantasy cricket, football, and basketball leagues and has partnerships with major sports leagues such as the NBA and Pro Kabaddi League.

== History ==
MPL was founded by Sai Srinivas Kiran and Shubham Malhotra in 2018, initially offering puzzle games and casual games and expanding to fantasy sports the following year. The company connects game publishers with users via its app platform. In 2021, the company bought over GamingMonk, an esports community platform.

The company currently offers 60 games in categories such as fantasy sports, sports games, puzzle, casual and board games. Given that certain games are banned in certain jurisdictions, the company has had to alter its offerings based on the users region. It employs over 800 people spread across offices in Bengaluru, Pune, Singapore and New York. The company claims to have over 90 million registered users on its platform.

A report by Mobile Premier League (MPL), that was published in 2024, has raised concerns about cybercriminals targeting young gamers for financial gain, exploiting their vulnerability and innocence. These scams pose significant risks to children's safety, privacy, and financial security, with potential consequences including identity theft, unauthorized bank access, and cyberbullying. Scammers often use psychological tricks and create fictitious identities, especially with the rise of AI.

== Geographic presence ==
MPL began as a mobile gaming application in India. It expanded to Indonesia, its second country market in 2019. In 2021, the company entered a third country when it launched operations in USA. In 2022, the company bought out GameDuell, a games studio based in Berlin thus giving it an entry into the European market.

As a part of cutbacks in 2022, the company announced it would exit the Indonesian market amongst other measures.

== Partnerships and brand ambassador ==
In 2019, the company became a broadcast partner for the Indian Premier League. It also signed up cricketer Virat Kohli as a brand ambassador. In 2020, the company became sponsors for Royal Challengers Bangalore and Kolkata Knight Riders in the Indian Premier League.

A subsidiary of the online gaming platform, MPL Sports Apparel & Accessories was the official kit sponsor of the Indian Men's Cricket Team, Indian Women's Cricket Team, and Indian Under-19 Cricket Team from November 2020 till December 2022.

In 2021, MPL Sports Foundation was announced as the principal sponsor of the Indian contingent participating in the 2020 Summer Olympics, 2022 Asian Games and 2022 Commonwealth Games under a partnership with the Indian Olympic Association.

== Funding ==
MPL counts Sequoia Capital, Go Ventures, RTP Global, Go-Ventures, Moore Strategic Ventures, Play Ventures, Base Partners, Telstra Ventures, Founders Circle Capital, and Times Internet amongst its investors. In 2021, it became India's second gaming unicorn when it raised funding in its Series E round at a valuation of $2.3 billion from Legatum Capital, RTP Global, Go-Ventures, Play Ventures, Base Partners, Founders Circle Capital and existing investors.
