= Nintendo Classics =

Line of classic Nintendo video games

- Developer: Nintendo European Research & Development
- Type: Classic video game distribution and emulation
- Launched: Switch: September 19, 2018; Switch 2: June 5, 2025
- Platforms: Nintendo Switch; Nintendo Switch 2
- Status: Active
- Website: Official website

Nintendo Classics (Note: Formerly known only as "Nintendo Switch Online classic game libraries"; the service was rebranded as "Nintendo Classics" on April 2, 2025.) is a line of emulated retro games distributed by Nintendo for the Nintendo Switch and Nintendo Switch 2. Subscribers to the Nintendo Switch Online service have access to several dedicated Nintendo Classics apps, each one containing an emulator for a previous Nintendo game console with a library of playable games. Games are accessible as long as the user has an active subscription, although users must connect to the internet at least once a week to access the apps whilst offline. The library was launched alongside the Nintendo Switch Online service in 2018 with 20 Nintendo Entertainment System games, and has expanded to include games from several other consoles, with new games being added on an irregular basis. Subscribers to the more expensive Nintendo Switch Online subscription tier, titled "Expansion Pack", (Note: Full title: "Nintendo Switch Online + Expansion Pack") have access to more consoles. The library features numerous games that were not available on the Virtual Console service of Nintendo's previous systems, with some games receiving their first international release through Nintendo Classics.

== Features ==
The replica Nintendo 64 controller (left) does not include a functional expansion slot, but the sealed cavity houses a rumble motor to include the functionality of the original Rumble Pak.

Each Nintendo Classics console emulator is accessed from a dedicated app, with players able to select a game to play from a provided list. The emulators support control remapping and save states, with most consoles also allowing players to rewind gameplay. The Nintendo Classics emulators include online multiplayer support, allowing players to play local multiplayer games remotely with friends. Some NES and SNES games also have an alternative version labeled "SP" ("Extra" in some regions) which alters the game in some way, typically unlocking additional modes, starting the player with additional items or levels, or starting the player midway through the game.

Subscribers can purchase wireless controllers based on those of the represented systems through Nintendo's online store. The controllers have additional buttons for compatibility with the Switch and Switch 2 interface, and enable special Easter eggs when used with the corresponding console emulator.

== Standard subscription ==
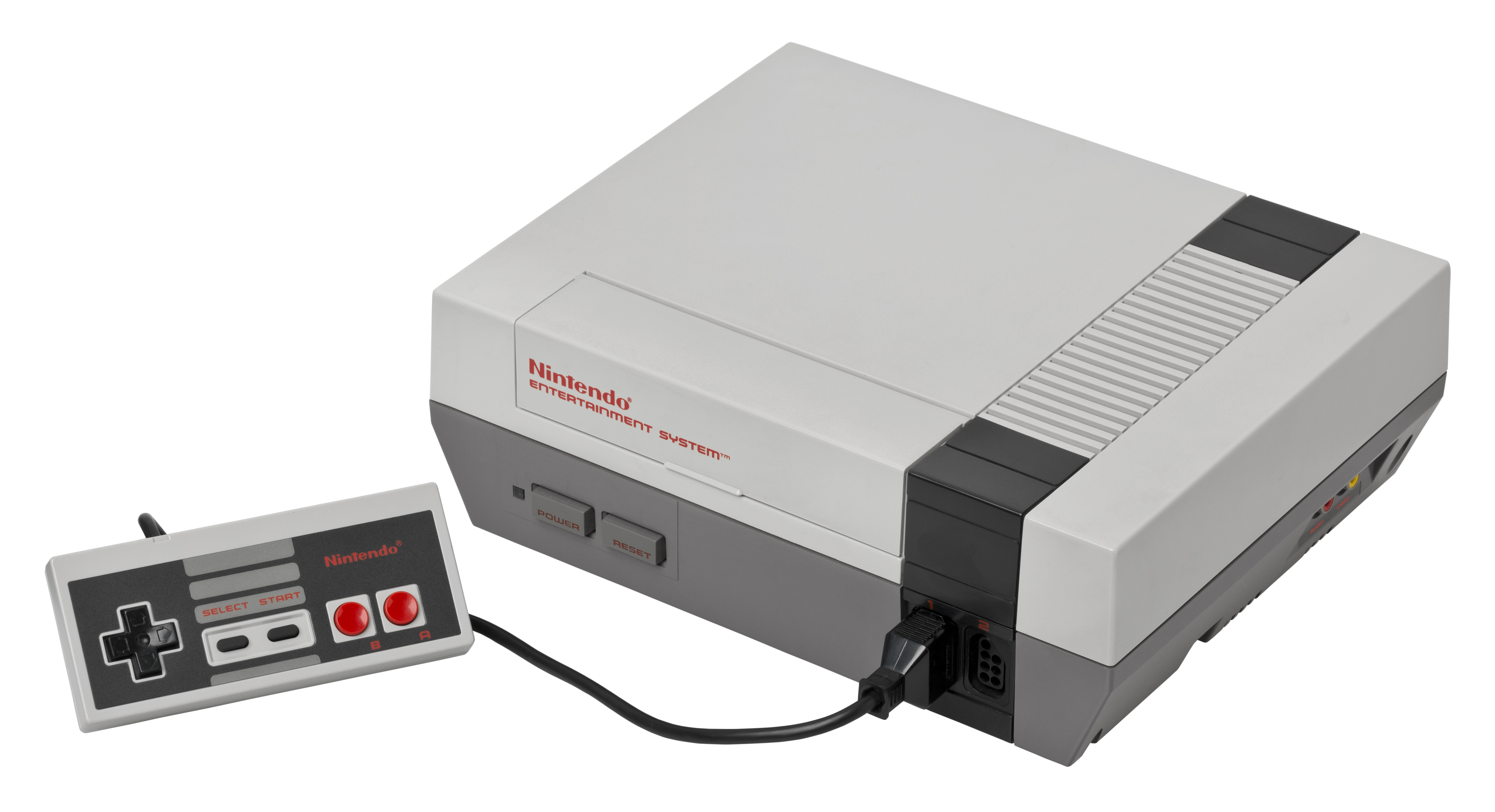
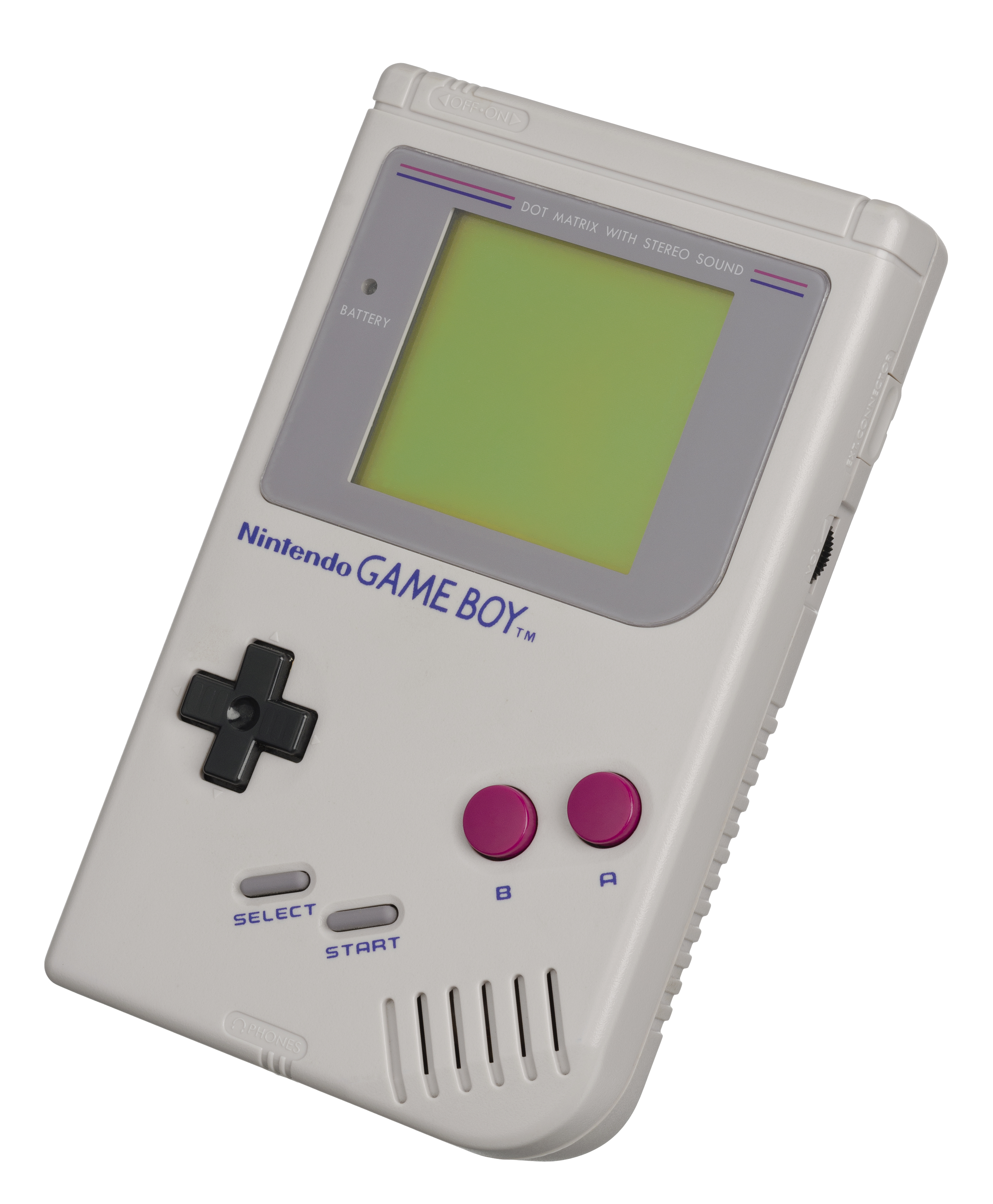
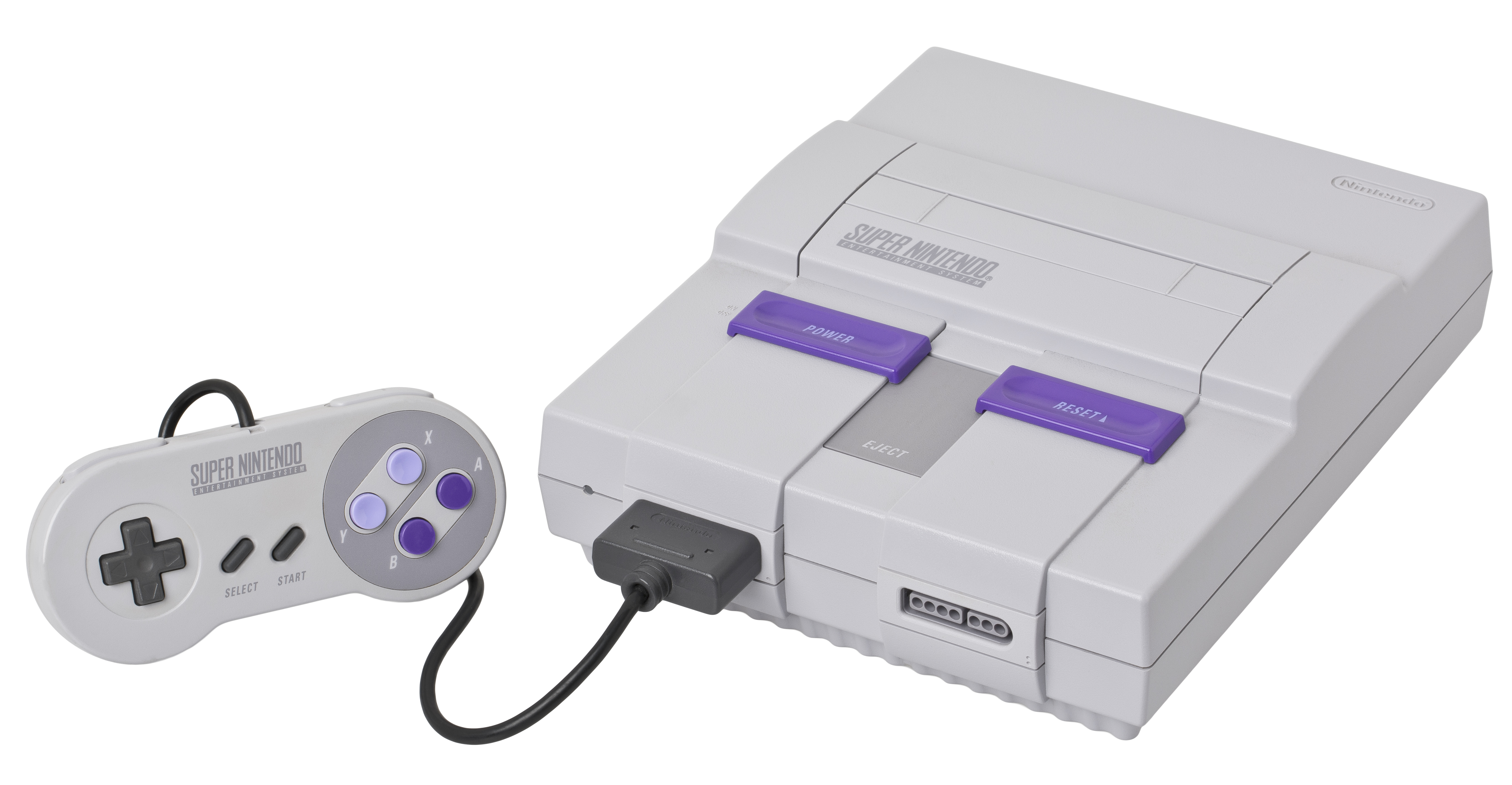
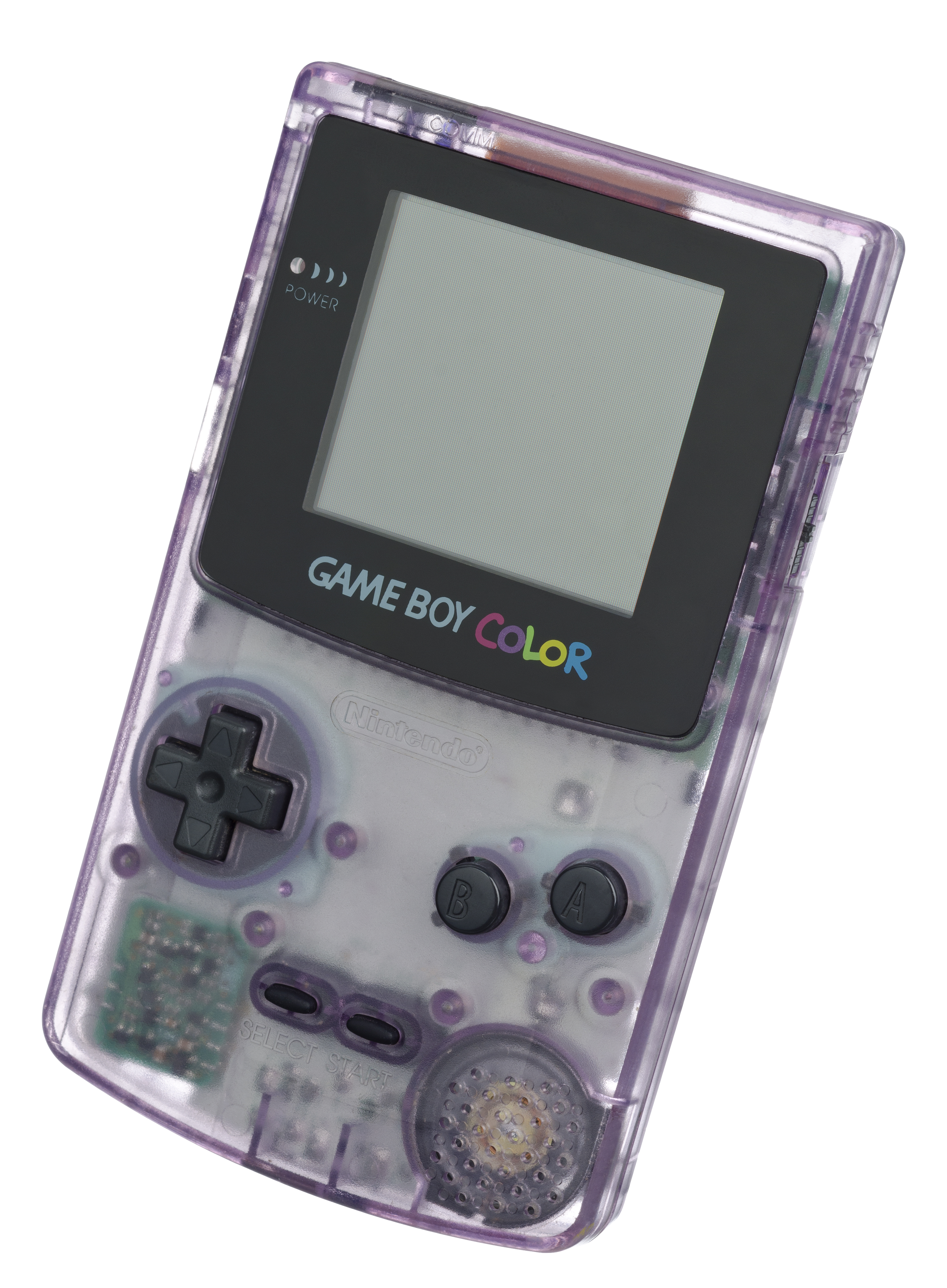
Nintendo Switch Online subscribers can access games for the NES, Game Boy (top row), Super NES, and Game Boy Color (bottom row).

=== Nintendo Entertainment System ===
The Nintendo Switch Online service launched on September 19, 2018, with 20 Nintendo Entertainment System (NES) games available for play at launch. During its first year, Nintendo Classics provided a new batch of NES games on a monthly basis. As of September 2, 2026, there are 99 (Note: 87 games in North America and PAL regions, 13 of which are exclusive to these regions; 86 games in Japan, 12 of which are exclusive to this region.) games and 20 "SP" variations available, including the following:

List of NES games on Nintendo Classics
| Release date | Game | Publisher(s) | NA/PAL | JP |
|---|---|---|---|---|
| September 19, 2018 | Balloon Fight | Nintendo | Yes | Yes |
| September 19, 2018 | Baseball | Nintendo | Yes | Yes |
| September 19, 2018 | Donkey Kong | Nintendo | Yes | Yes |
| September 19, 2018 | Double Dragon | Arc System Works | Yes | Yes |
| September 19, 2018 | Dr. Mario | Nintendo | Yes | Yes |
| September 19, 2018 | Excitebike | Nintendo | Yes | Yes |
| September 19, 2018 | Ghosts 'n Goblins | Capcom | Yes | Yes |
| September 19, 2018 | Gradius | Konami | Yes | Yes |
| September 19, 2018 | Ice Climber | Nintendo | Yes | Yes |
| September 19, 2018 | Ice Hockey (Note: The Family Computer Disk System version was released in Japan) | Nintendo | Yes | Yes |
| September 19, 2018 | The Legend of Zelda | Nintendo | Yes | Yes |
| September 19, 2018 | Mario Bros. | Nintendo | Yes | Yes |
| September 19, 2018 | Pro Wrestling | Nintendo | Yes | Yes |
| September 19, 2018 | River City Ransom | Arc System Works | Yes | Yes |
| September 19, 2018 | Soccer | Nintendo | Yes | Yes |
| September 19, 2018 | Super Mario Bros. | Nintendo | Yes | Yes |
| September 19, 2018 | Super Mario Bros. 3 | Nintendo | Yes | Yes |
| September 19, 2018 | Tecmo Bowl | Koei Tecmo | Yes | Yes |
| September 19, 2018 | Tennis | Nintendo | Yes | Yes |
| September 19, 2018 | Yoshi | Nintendo | Yes | Yes |
| October 10, 2018 | The Legend of Zelda SP | Nintendo | Yes | Yes |
| October 10, 2018 | NES Open Tournament Golf | Nintendo | Yes | Yes |
| October 10, 2018 | Solomon's Key | Koei Tecmo | Yes | Yes |
| October 10, 2018 | Super Dodge Ball | Arc System Works | Yes | Yes |
| November 14, 2018 | Gradius SP (Stage 5) | Konami | Yes | Yes |
| November 14, 2018 | Metroid | Nintendo | Yes | Yes |
| November 14, 2018 | Mighty Bomb Jack | Koei Tecmo | Yes | Yes |
| November 14, 2018 | NES Open Tournament Golf SP | Nintendo | No | Yes |
| November 14, 2018 | TwinBee | Konami | Yes | Yes |
| December 12, 2018 | Adventures of Lolo (NA) | HAL Laboratory | Yes | No |
| December 12, 2018 | Adventures of Lolo (JP) | HAL Laboratory | No | Yes |
| December 12, 2018 | Dr. Mario SP | Nintendo | Yes | Yes |
| December 12, 2018 | Metroid SP (Ridley battle) | Nintendo | Yes | Yes |
| December 12, 2018 | Ninja Gaiden | Koei Tecmo | Yes | Yes |
| December 12, 2018 | Wario's Woods | Nintendo | Yes | Yes |
| January 16, 2019 | Blaster Master | Sunsoft | Yes | Yes |
| January 16, 2019 | Ghosts'n Goblins SP | Capcom | Yes | Yes |
| January 16, 2019 | Joy Mech Fight (Note: Although available in the Western library, it is still only in its original Japanese language.) | Nintendo | Yes (Note: Originally exclusive to Japan, but was eventually released in Western regions on September 6, 2023) | Yes |
| January 16, 2019 | Ninja Gaiden SP | Koei Tecmo | Yes | Yes |
| January 16, 2019 | Zelda II: The Adventure of Link | Nintendo | Yes | Yes |
| February 13, 2019 | Blaster Master SP | Sunsoft | Yes | Yes |
| February 13, 2019 | Kirby's Adventure | Nintendo | Yes | Yes |
| February 13, 2019 | Metroid SP (Mother Brain battle) | Nintendo | Yes | Yes |
| February 13, 2019 | Super Mario Bros. 2 | Nintendo | Yes | Yes |
| February 13, 2019 | Tsuppari Ōzumō | Koei Tecmo | No | Yes |
| March 13, 2019 | Fire Emblem: Shadow Dragon and the Blade of Light | Nintendo | No (Note: A standalone, English version of the game was released for purchase for a limited time via Nintendo eShop in the Americas, Europe, Oceania, and South Korea. It was available from December 4, 2020 until March 31, 2021.) | Yes |
| March 13, 2019 | Kid Icarus | Nintendo | Yes | Yes |
| March 13, 2019 | Kirby's Adventure SP | Nintendo | Yes | Yes |
| March 13, 2019 | StarTropics | Nintendo | Yes | No |
| March 13, 2019 | Yie Ar Kung-Fu | Konami | No | Yes |
| March 13, 2019 | Zelda II: The Adventure of Link SP | Nintendo | Yes | Yes |
| April 10, 2019 | Kid Icarus SP | Nintendo | Yes | Yes |
| April 10, 2019 | Punch-Out!! | Nintendo | Yes | Yes |
| April 10, 2019 | Star Soldier | Konami | Yes | Yes |
| April 10, 2019 | Super Mario Bros.: The Lost Levels (Note: A Family Computer Disk System game) | Nintendo | Yes | Yes |
| May 15, 2019 | Clu Clu Land | Nintendo | Yes | No |
| May 15, 2019 | Clu Clu Land: Welcome to New Cluclu Land (Note: A Family Computer Disk System port of the arcade edition titled Vs. Clu Clu Land) | Nintendo | No | Yes |
| May 15, 2019 | Donkey Kong Jr. | Nintendo | Yes | Yes |
| May 15, 2019 | Star Soldier SP | Konami | Yes | Yes |
| May 15, 2019 | Vs. Excitebike | Nintendo | Yes | Yes |
| June 12, 2019 | City Connection | City Connection | Yes | Yes |
| June 12, 2019 | Double Dragon II: The Revenge | Arc System Works | Yes | Yes |
| June 12, 2019 | TwinBee SP | Konami | Yes | Yes |
| June 12, 2019 | Volleyball | Nintendo | Yes | Yes |
| July 17, 2019 | Donkey Kong 3 | Nintendo | Yes | Yes |
| July 17, 2019 | Mighty Bomb Jack SP | Koei Tecmo | Yes | Yes |
| July 17, 2019 | Wrecking Crew | Nintendo | Yes | Yes |
| August 21, 2019 | Downtown Nekketsu March: Super-Awesome Field Day! | Arc System Works | Yes | Yes |
| August 21, 2019 | Gradius SP (Second loop) | Konami | Yes | Yes |
| August 21, 2019 | Kung-Fu Heroes | Culture Brain | Yes | Yes |
| August 21, 2019 | Vice: Project Doom | Sega | Yes | Yes (Note: Originally exclusive to Western regions, but was eventually released in Japan on July 15, 2020) |
| December 12, 2019 | Crystalis | SNK | Yes | Yes (Note: Originally exclusive to Western regions, but was eventually released in Japan on February 19, 2020) |
| December 12, 2019 | Famicom Wars | Nintendo | No | Yes |
| December 12, 2019 | Journey to Silius | Sunsoft | Yes | Yes (Note: Originally exclusive to Western regions, but was eventually released in Japan on May 20, 2020) |
| December 12, 2019 | Route-16 Turbo | Sunsoft | No | Yes |
| February 19, 2020 | Eliminator Boat Duel | Piko Interactive | Yes | No |
| February 19, 2020 | The Mystery of Atlantis | Sunsoft | Yes (Note: Originally exclusive to Japan, but was eventually released in Western regions on July 4, 2024) | Yes |
| February 19, 2020 | Shadow of the Ninja | Natsume Inc. | Yes | No |
| April 20, 2020 | Fire Emblem: Shadow Dragon and the Blade of Light SP (Medeus Battle) | Nintendo | No | Yes |
| April 20, 2020 | Fire Emblem: Shadow Dragon and the Blade of Light SP (Triangle Attack) | Nintendo | No | Yes |
| May 20, 2020 | Rygar | Koei Tecmo | Yes | Yes |
| July 15, 2020 | The Immortal | Piko Interactive | Yes | No |
| September 23, 2020 | S.C.A.T.: Special Cybernetic Attack Team | Natsume Inc. | Yes | No |
| December 18, 2020 | Nightshade | Piko Interactive | Yes | No |
| December 18, 2020 | Smash Ping Pong | Nintendo | No | Yes |
| February 17, 2021 | Fire 'n Ice | Koei Tecmo | Yes | Yes |
| May 26, 2021 | Ninja JaJaMaru-kun | City Connection | Yes | Yes |
| July 28, 2021 | Super Mario Bros. 3 SP | Nintendo | Yes | Yes |
| February 9, 2022 | EarthBound Beginnings | Nintendo | Yes | Yes |
| March 30, 2022 | Dig Dug II | Bandai Namco Entertainment | Yes | Yes |
| March 30, 2022 | Mappy-Land | Bandai Namco Entertainment | Yes | Yes |
| May 26, 2022 | Pinball | Nintendo | Yes | Yes |
| July 21, 2022 | Daiva Story 6: Imperial of Nirsartia | D4 Enterprise | Yes | Yes |
| March 15, 2023 | Xevious | Bandai Namco Entertainment | Yes | Yes |
| June 5, 2023 | Mystery Tower | Bandai Namco Entertainment | Yes | Yes |
| October 31, 2023 | Devil World | Nintendo | Yes | Yes |
| October 31, 2023 | The Mysterious Murasame Castle | Nintendo | Yes | Yes |
| October 31, 2023 | Ninja JaJaMaru-kun SP | City Connection | Yes | Yes |
| February 21, 2024 | R.C. Pro-Am | Xbox Game Studios | Yes | No |
| February 21, 2024 | Snake Rattle 'n' Roll | Xbox Game Studios | Yes | No |
| July 4, 2024 | Cobra Triangle | Xbox Game Studios | Yes | No |
| July 4, 2024 | Donkey Kong Jr. Math | Nintendo | Yes | Yes |
| July 4, 2024 | Famicom Mukashibanashi: Shin Onigashima | Nintendo | No | Yes |
| July 4, 2024 | Golf | Nintendo | Yes | Yes |
| July 4, 2024 | Gomoku Narabe Renju | Nintendo | No | Yes |
| July 4, 2024 | Mach Rider | Nintendo | Yes | Yes |
| July 4, 2024 | Mah-Jong | Nintendo | No | Yes |
| July 4, 2024 | Solar Jetman | Xbox Game Studios | Yes | No |
| July 4, 2024 | Urban Champion | Nintendo | Yes | Yes |
| December 12, 2024 | Tetris | Nintendo | Yes | Yes |
| November 26, 2025 | Battletoads | Xbox Game Studios | Yes | Yes |
| November 26, 2025 | Ninja Gaiden II: The Dark Sword of Chaos | Koei Tecmo | Yes | Yes |
| April 9, 2026 | Mendel Palace | Bandai Namco Entertainment | Yes | Yes |
| April 9, 2026 | Pac-Man | Bandai Namco Entertainment | Yes | Yes |
| April 9, 2026 | The Tower of Druaga | Bandai Namco Entertainment | Yes | Yes |
| September 2, 2026 | Dragon Buster | Bandai Namco Entertainment | No | Yes |
| September 2, 2026 | Ikari Warriors | SNK | Yes | Yes |
| September 2, 2026 | Ninja Gaiden III: The Ancient Ship of Doom | Koei Tecmo | Yes | Yes |
| September 2, 2026 | R.C. Pro-Am II | Xbox Game Studios | Yes | No |

"SP" game

=== Super Nintendo Entertainment System ===
Announced in a Nintendo Direct on September 4, 2019, Super Nintendo Entertainment System (SNES) games were added to the service worldwide with 20 titles on September 5, 2019. An update on July 29, 2025, added the ability to remap each game's controls, as well as support for Super NES Mouse controls with compatible games; Switch 2 allows these games to be controlled with the Joy-Con 2's mouse controls, while playing on Switch requires a compatible USB mouse. As of October 9, 2025, there are 85 (Note: 77 games in North America and PAL regions, 13 of which are exclusive to these regions; 72 games in Japan, 8 of which are exclusive to this region.) games and 7 "SP" variations available, including the following:

List of SNES games on Nintendo Classics
| Release date | Game | Publisher(s) | NA/PAL | JP |
|---|---|---|---|---|
| September 5, 2019 | Brawl Brothers | City Connection | Yes | Yes |
| September 5, 2019 | Breath of Fire | Capcom | Yes | Yes |
| September 5, 2019 | Demon's Crest | Capcom | Yes | Yes |
| September 5, 2019 | F-Zero | Nintendo | Yes | Yes |
| September 5, 2019 | Joe & Mac 2: Lost in the Tropics | G-Mode | Yes | Yes |
| September 5, 2019 | Kirby's Dream Course | Nintendo | Yes | Yes |
| September 5, 2019 | Kirby's Dream Land 3 | Nintendo | Yes | Yes |
| September 5, 2019 | The Legend of Zelda: A Link to the Past | Nintendo | Yes | Yes |
| September 5, 2019 | Pilotwings | Nintendo | Yes | Yes |
| September 5, 2019 | Smash Tennis | Bandai Namco Entertainment | Yes (Note: Originally exclusive to Japan, but was eventually released in Western regions on February 19, 2020) | Yes |
| September 5, 2019 | Star Fox | Nintendo | Yes | Yes |
| September 5, 2019 | Stunt Race FX | Nintendo | Yes | Yes |
| September 5, 2019 | Super E.D.F. Earth Defense Force | City Connection | Yes | Yes |
| September 5, 2019 | Super Ghouls 'n Ghosts | Capcom | Yes | Yes |
| September 5, 2019 | Super Mario Kart | Nintendo | Yes | Yes |
| September 5, 2019 | Super Mario World | Nintendo | Yes | Yes |
| September 5, 2019 | Super Mario World 2: Yoshi's Island | Nintendo | Yes | Yes |
| September 5, 2019 | Super Metroid | Nintendo | Yes | Yes |
| September 5, 2019 | Super Puyo Puyo 2 | Sega | Yes | Yes |
| September 5, 2019 | ~~Super Soccer~~ (removed on March 28, 2025) | Spike Chunsoft | Yes | Yes |
| September 5, 2019 | Super Tennis | Nintendo (Note: Published by Tonkin House in Japan) | Yes | Yes (Note: Originally exclusive to Western regions, but was eventually released in Japan on September 23, 2020) |
| December 12, 2019 | Breath of Fire II | Capcom | Yes | Yes (Note: Originally exclusive to Western regions, but was eventually released in Japan on February 19, 2020) |
| December 12, 2019 | Kirby Super Star | Nintendo | Yes | Yes |
| December 12, 2019 | Star Fox 2 | Nintendo | Yes | Yes |
| December 12, 2019 | Super Punch-Out!! | Nintendo | Yes | Yes (Note: Originally exclusive to Western regions, but was eventually released in Japan on May 20, 2020) |
| February 19, 2020 | Pop'n TwinBee | Konami | Yes | Yes |
| May 20, 2020 | Operation Logic Bomb | City Connection | Yes | No |
| May 20, 2020 | Panel de Pon | Nintendo | Yes (Note: Panel de Pon was internationally released as Tetris Attack in 1996. This marks the first time the original game gets a worldwide release.) | Yes |
| May 20, 2020 | Wild Guns | Natsume Inc. | Yes | Yes (Note: Originally exclusive to Western regions, but was eventually released in Japan on September 23, 2020) |
| July 15, 2020 | Donkey Kong Country | Nintendo | Yes | Yes |
| July 15, 2020 | Natsume Championship Wrestling | Natsume Inc. | Yes | No |
| July 15, 2020 | Shin Megami Tensei | Atlus | No | Yes |
| September 3, 2020 | Super Mario All-Stars | Nintendo | Yes | Yes |
| September 23, 2020 | Donkey Kong Country 2 | Nintendo | Yes | Yes |
| September 23, 2020 | Fire Emblem: Mystery of the Emblem | Nintendo | No | Yes |
| September 23, 2020 | Mario's Super Picross | Nintendo | Yes | Yes (Note: Originally exclusive to Western regions, but was eventually released in Japan on February 17, 2021) |
| September 23, 2020 | The Peace Keepers | City Connection | Yes | No |
| December 18, 2020 | Amazing Hebereke | Sunsoft | Yes (Note: Originally exclusive to Japan, but was eventually released in Western regions on April 12, 2024) | Yes |
| December 18, 2020 | Donkey Kong Country 3 | Nintendo | Yes | Yes |
| December 18, 2020 | The Ignition Factor | City Connection | Yes | Yes |
| December 18, 2020 | Kunio-kun no Dodgeball da yo Zen'in Shūgō! | Arc System Works | Yes (Note: Originally exclusive to Japan, but was eventually released in Western regions on September 18, 2024) | Yes |
| December 18, 2020 | Super Valis IV | Edia | Yes | No |
| December 18, 2020 | Tuff E Nuff | City Connection | Yes | Yes (Note: Originally exclusive to Western regions, but was eventually released in Japan on July 28, 2021) |
| February 17, 2021 | Doomsday Warrior | Edia | Yes | Yes (Note: Originally exclusive to Western regions, but was eventually released in Japan on May 26, 2021) |
| February 17, 2021 | Prehistorik Man | Interplay Entertainment | Yes | No |
| February 17, 2021 | Psycho Dream | Edia | Yes | Yes |
| February 17, 2021 | Shin Megami Tensei II | Atlus | No | Yes |
| May 26, 2021 | Fire Emblem: Genealogy of the Holy War | Nintendo | No | Yes |
| May 26, 2021 | Joe & Mac | G-Mode | Yes | Yes |
| May 26, 2021 | Magical Drop II | G-Mode | Yes | Yes |
| May 26, 2021 | Spanky's Quest | Natsume Inc. | Yes | No |
| May 26, 2021 | Super Baseball Simulator 1.000 | Culture Brain | Yes | Yes (Note: Originally exclusive to Western regions, but was eventually released in Japan on June 5, 2023) |
| May 26, 2021 | Super Mario Kart SP | Nintendo | Yes | Yes |
| July 28, 2021 | Bombuzal | Throwback Entertainment | Yes | Yes |
| July 28, 2021 | Claymates | Interplay Entertainment | Yes | No |
| July 28, 2021 | Jelly Boy | Throwback Entertainment | Yes | No |
| July 28, 2021 | Shin Megami Tensei If… | Atlus | No | Yes |
| February 9, 2022 | EarthBound | Nintendo | Yes | Yes |
| February 9, 2022 | Super Metroid SP | Nintendo | Yes | Yes |
| March 30, 2022 | Earthworm Jim 2 | Interplay Entertainment | Yes | No |
| March 30, 2022 | Harvest Moon | Natsume Inc. (Note: Published by Marvelous in Japan) | Yes (Note: Originally exclusive to Japan, but was eventually released in Western regions on June 5, 2023) | Yes |
| March 30, 2022 | Super Mario World SP | Nintendo | Yes | Yes |
| March 30, 2022 | Super Punch-Out!! SP | Nintendo | Yes | Yes |
| May 26, 2022 | Congo's Caper | G-Mode | Yes | No |
| May 26, 2022 | Rival Turf! | City Connection | Yes | Yes |
| May 26, 2022 | Umihara Kawase | Studio Saizensen | No | Yes |
| June 9, 2022 | Kirby Super Star SP | Nintendo | Yes | Yes |
| June 9, 2022 | Kirby's Dream Course SP | Nintendo | Yes | Yes |
| June 9, 2022 | Kirby's Dream Land 3 SP | Nintendo | Yes | Yes |
| July 21, 2022 | Fighter's History | G-Mode | Yes | Yes |
| July 21, 2022 | Kirby's Avalanche | Nintendo | Yes | No |
| July 21, 2022 | Kirby's Star Stacker | Nintendo | Yes (Note: Originally exclusive to Japan, but was eventually released in Western regions on September 6, 2023) | Yes |
| March 15, 2023 | Side Pocket | G-Mode | Yes | Yes |
| February 21, 2024 | Battletoads in Battlemaniacs | Xbox Game Studios | Yes | Yes (Note: Originally exclusive to Western regions, but was eventually released in Japan on April 12, 2024) |
| February 21, 2024 | Killer Instinct | Xbox Game Studios | Yes | No |
| April 12, 2024 | Marvelous: Mōhitotsu no Takarajima | Nintendo | No | Yes |
| April 12, 2024 | Super R-Type | City Connection | Yes | Yes |
| April 12, 2024 | Wrecking Crew '98 | Nintendo | Yes | Yes |
| September 18, 2024 | Angelique | Koei Tecmo | No | Yes |
| September 18, 2024 | Battletoads/Double Dragon | Xbox Game Studios | Yes | No |
| September 18, 2024 | Big Run | City Connection | Yes | Yes |
| September 18, 2024 | Cosmo Gang the Puzzle | Bandai Namco Entertainment | Yes | Yes |
| January 24, 2025 | Fatal Fury 2 | Takara | Yes | Yes |
| January 24, 2025 | Super Ninja Boy | Culture Brain | Yes | Yes |
| January 24, 2025 | Sutte Hakkun | Nintendo | Yes | Yes |
| March 28, 2025 | Nobunaga's Ambition | Koei Tecmo | Yes | Yes |
| March 28, 2025 | Nobunaga's Ambition: Lord of Darkness | Koei Tecmo | Yes | Yes |
| March 28, 2025 | Romance of the Three Kingdoms IV: Wall of Fire | Koei Tecmo | Yes | Yes |
| March 28, 2025 | Uncharted Waters: New Horizons | Koei Tecmo | Yes | Yes |
| July 29, 2025 | Mario Paint | Nintendo | Yes | Yes |
| October 9, 2025 | Bubsy in Claws Encounters of the Furred Kind | Atari | Yes | Yes |
| October 9, 2025 | Fatal Fury Special | Takara | Yes | Yes |
| October 9, 2025 | Mario & Wario | Nintendo | Yes | Yes |

"SP" game

=== Game Boy and Game Boy Color ===
Announced in a Nintendo Direct on February 8, 2023, Game Boy (GB) and Game Boy Color (GBC) games were added to the service worldwide with 10 games the same day. The Game Boy emulator includes multiple display settings that recreate the visual appearance and color palettes of the original Game Boy, Game Boy Pocket, or Game Boy Color. Super Game Boy features are not emulated. As of October 27, 2026, there are 51 (Note: 49 games in North America and PAL regions, 2 of which are exclusive to these regions; 49 games in Japan, 2 of which are exclusive to this region.) games available, including the following:

List of Game Boy and Game Boy Color games on Nintendo Classics
| Release date | Game | Publisher(s) | Platform | NA/PAL | JP |
|---|---|---|---|---|---|
| February 8, 2023 | Alone in the Dark: The New Nightmare | THQ Nordic | GBC | Yes | No |
| February 8, 2023 | Game & Watch Gallery 3 | Nintendo | GBC | Yes | Yes |
| February 8, 2023 | Gargoyle's Quest | Capcom | GB | Yes | Yes |
| February 8, 2023 | Kirby's Dream Land | Nintendo | GB | Yes | Yes |
| February 8, 2023 | The Legend of Zelda: Link's Awakening DX | Nintendo | GBC | Yes | Yes |
| February 8, 2023 | Metroid II: Return of Samus | Nintendo | GB | Yes | Yes |
| February 8, 2023 | Super Mario Land 2: 6 Golden Coins | Nintendo | GB | Yes | Yes |
| February 8, 2023 | Tetris | Nintendo | GB | Yes | Yes |
| February 8, 2023 | Wario Land 3 | Nintendo | GBC | Yes | Yes |
| February 8, 2023 | Yakuman | Nintendo | GB | No | Yes |
| March 15, 2023 | BurgerTime Deluxe | G-Mode | GB | Yes | Yes |
| March 15, 2023 | Kirby's Dream Land 2 | Nintendo | GB | Yes | Yes |
| June 5, 2023 | Blaster Master: Enemy Below | Sunsoft | GBC | Yes | Yes |
| June 5, 2023 | Kirby Tilt 'n' Tumble | Nintendo | GBC | Yes | Yes |
| July 27, 2023 | The Legend of Zelda: Oracle of Ages | Nintendo | GBC | Yes | Yes |
| July 27, 2023 | The Legend of Zelda: Oracle of Seasons | Nintendo | GBC | Yes | Yes |
| August 8, 2023 | Pokémon Trading Card Game | Nintendo | GBC | Yes | Yes |
| September 6, 2023 | Quest for Camelot | Nintendo | GBC | Yes | No |
| October 31, 2023 | Castlevania Legends | Konami | GB | Yes | Yes |
| March 12, 2024 | Dr. Mario | Nintendo | GB | Yes | Yes |
| March 12, 2024 | Mario Golf | Nintendo | GBC | Yes | Yes |
| March 12, 2024 | Mario Tennis | Nintendo | GBC | Yes | Yes |
| May 15, 2024 | Alleyway | Nintendo | GB | Yes | Yes |
| May 15, 2024 | Baseball | Nintendo | GB | Yes | Yes |
| May 15, 2024 | Kaeru no Tame ni Kane wa Naru | Nintendo | GB | No | Yes |
| May 15, 2024 | Super Mario Land | Nintendo | GB | Yes | Yes |
| June 7, 2024 | Mega Man: Dr. Wily's Revenge | Capcom | GB | Yes | Yes |
| June 7, 2024 | Mega Man II | Capcom | GB | Yes | Yes |
| June 7, 2024 | Mega Man III | Capcom | GB | Yes | Yes |
| June 7, 2024 | Mega Man IV | Capcom | GB | Yes | Yes |
| June 7, 2024 | Mega Man V | Capcom | GB | Yes | Yes |
| November 22, 2024 | Donkey Kong Land | Nintendo | GB | Yes | Yes |
| November 26, 2024 | Donkey Kong Land 2 | Nintendo | GB | Yes | Yes |
| December 4, 2024 | Donkey Kong Land III | Nintendo | GB | Yes | No |
| December 4, 2024 | Donkey Kong Land III | Nintendo | GBC | No | Yes |
| December 12, 2024 | Tetris DX | Nintendo | GBC | Yes | Yes |
| March 7, 2025 | Donkey Kong | Nintendo | GB | Yes | Yes |
| March 7, 2025 | Mario's Picross | Nintendo | GB | Yes | Yes |
| May 23, 2025 | Gradius: The Interstellar Assault | Konami | GB | Yes | Yes |
| May 23, 2025 | Kirby's Star Stacker | Nintendo | GB | Yes | Yes |
| May 23, 2025 | Survival Kids | Konami | GBC | Yes | Yes |
| May 23, 2025 | The Sword of Hope | Kemco | GB | Yes | Yes |
| November 26, 2025 | Bionic Commando | Capcom | GB | Yes | Yes |
| November 26, 2025 | Kid Icarus: Of Myths and Monsters | Nintendo | GB | Yes | Yes |
| February 4, 2026 | Balloon Kid | Nintendo | GB | Yes | No |
| February 4, 2026 | Balloon Kid | Nintendo | GBC | No | Yes |
| February 4, 2026 | Yoshi | Nintendo | GB | Yes | Yes |
| July 8, 2026 | Fortified Zone | City Connection | GB | Yes | Yes |
| July 8, 2026 | The Sword of Hope II | Kemco | GB | Yes | Yes |
| July 8, 2026 | Wario Land: Super Mario Land 3 | Nintendo | GB | Yes | Yes |
| October 27, 2026 | Avenging Spirit | City Connection | GB | Yes | Yes |
| October 27, 2026 | Mole Mania | Nintendo | GB | Yes | Yes |
| October 27, 2026 | Revenge of the 'Gator | HAL Laboratory | GB | Yes | Yes |

== Expansion Pack ==
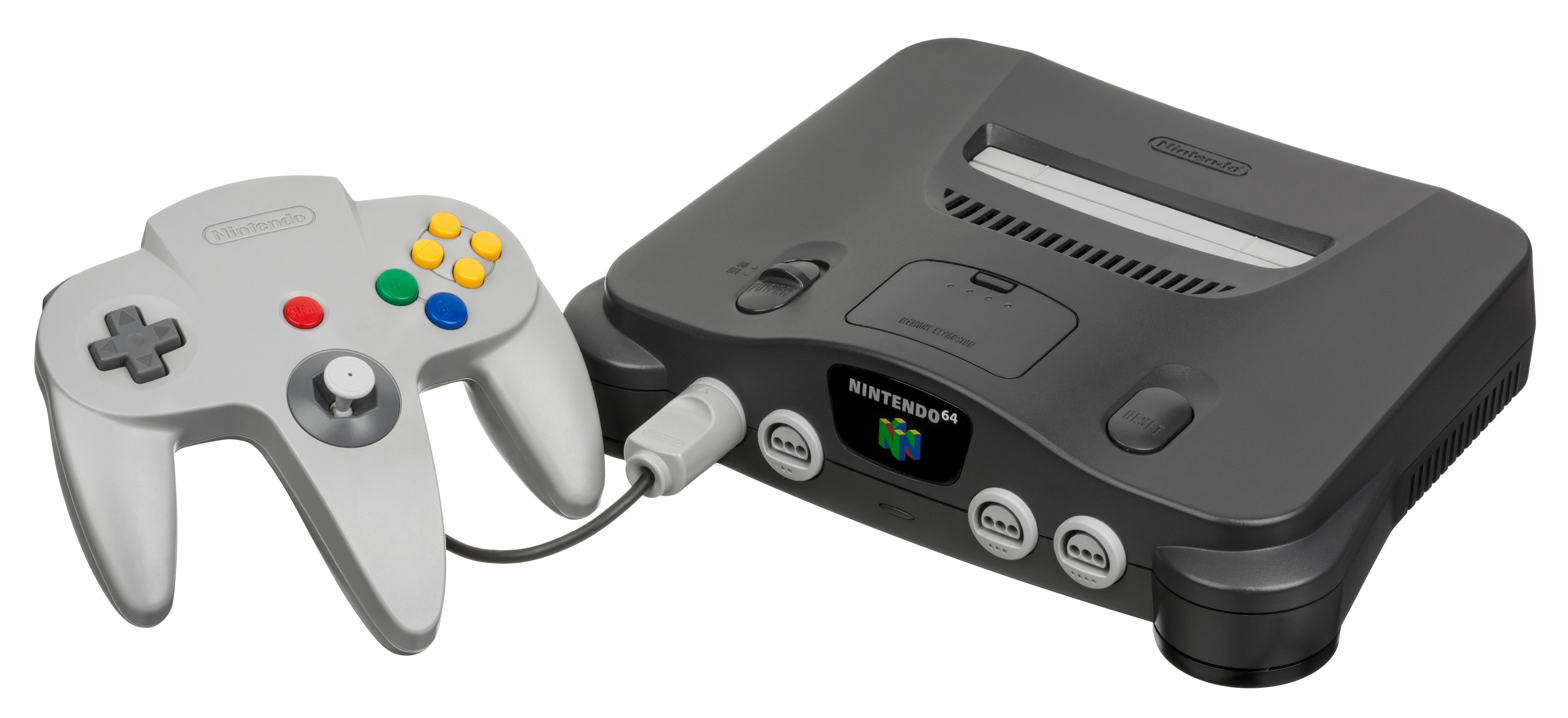
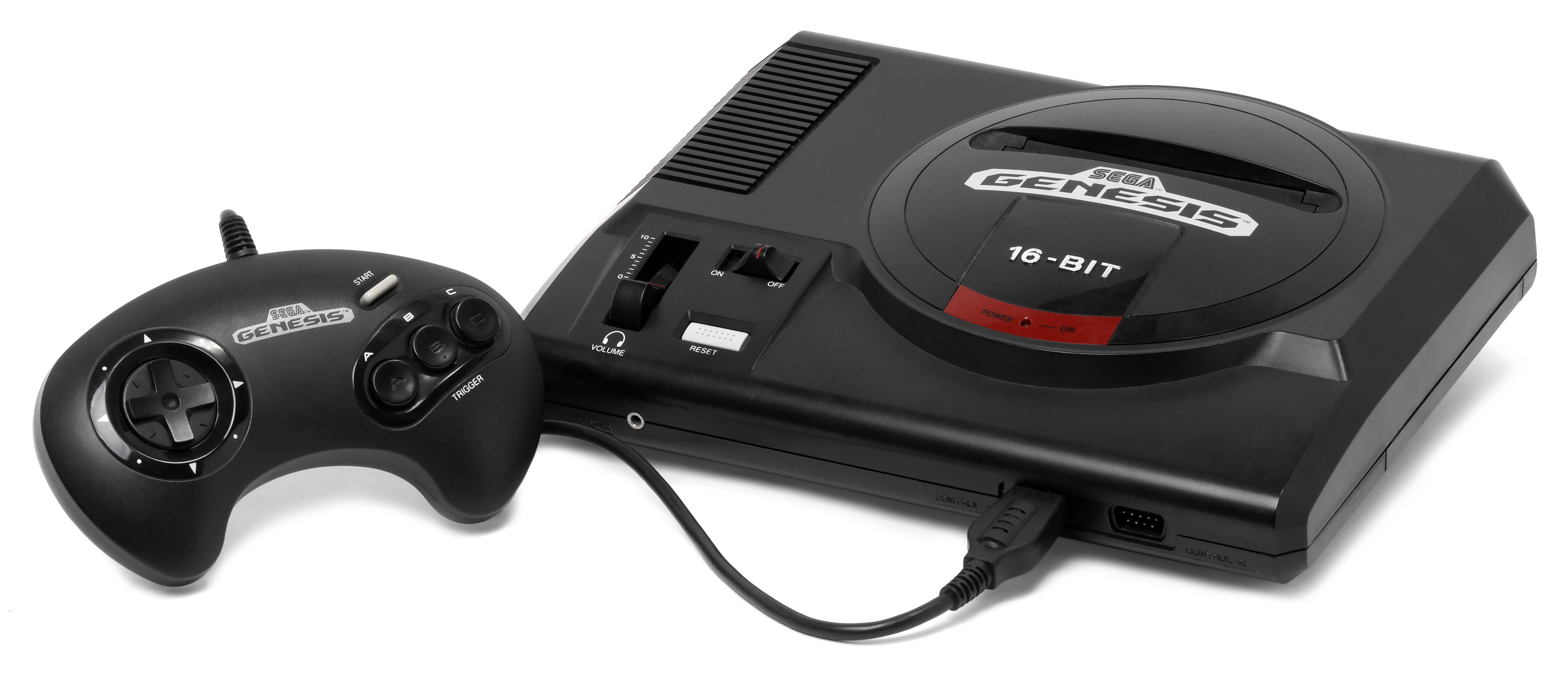
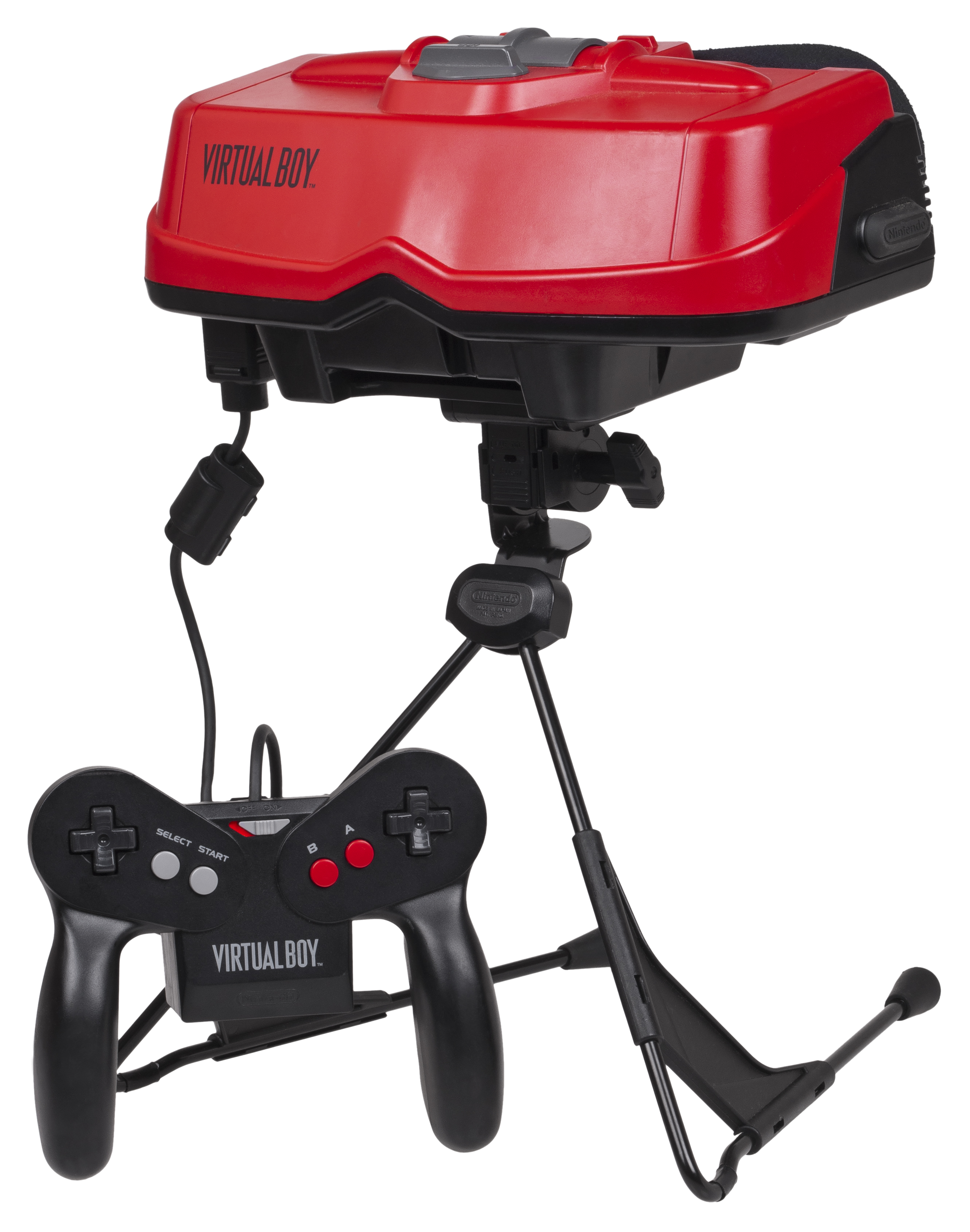
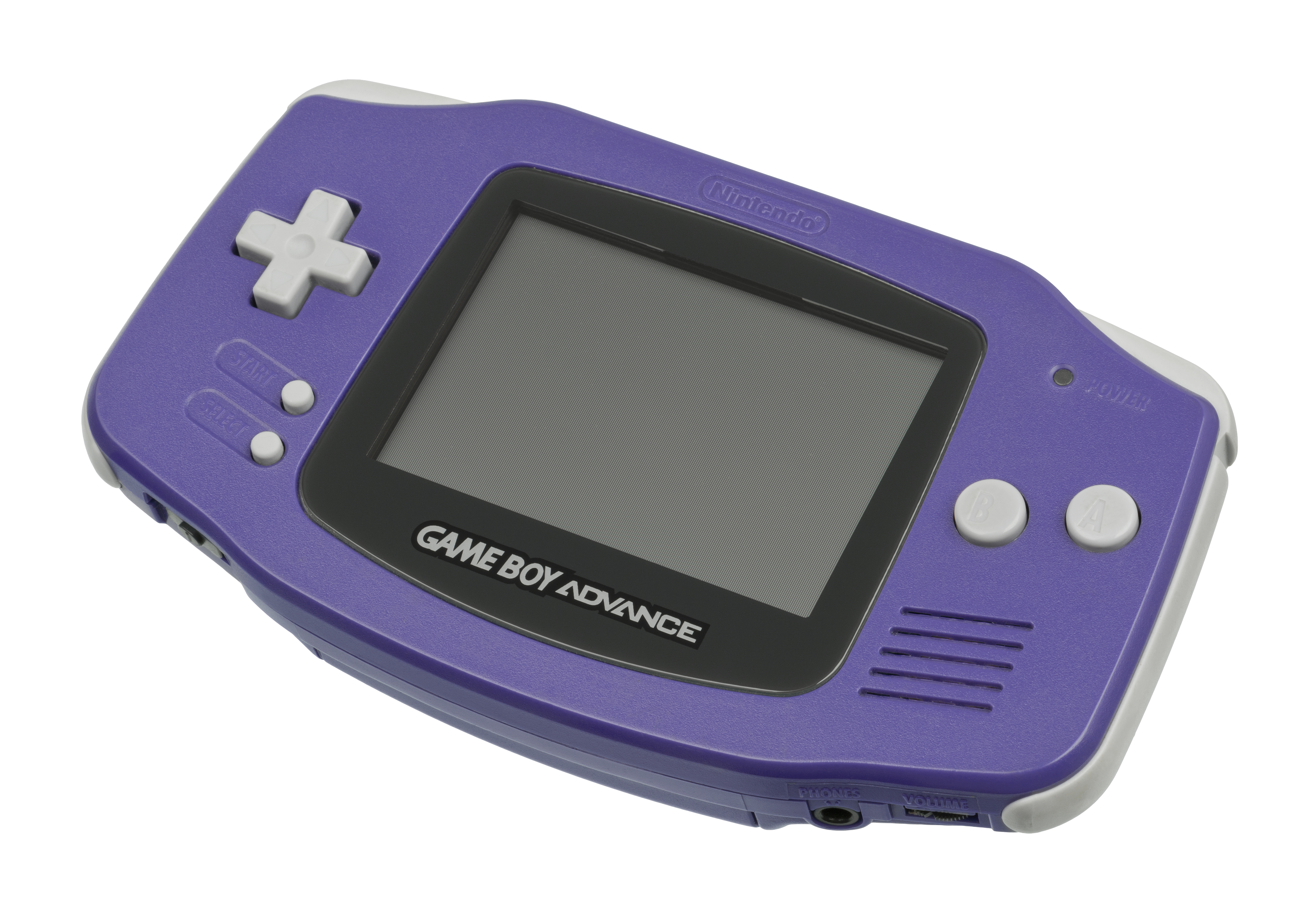
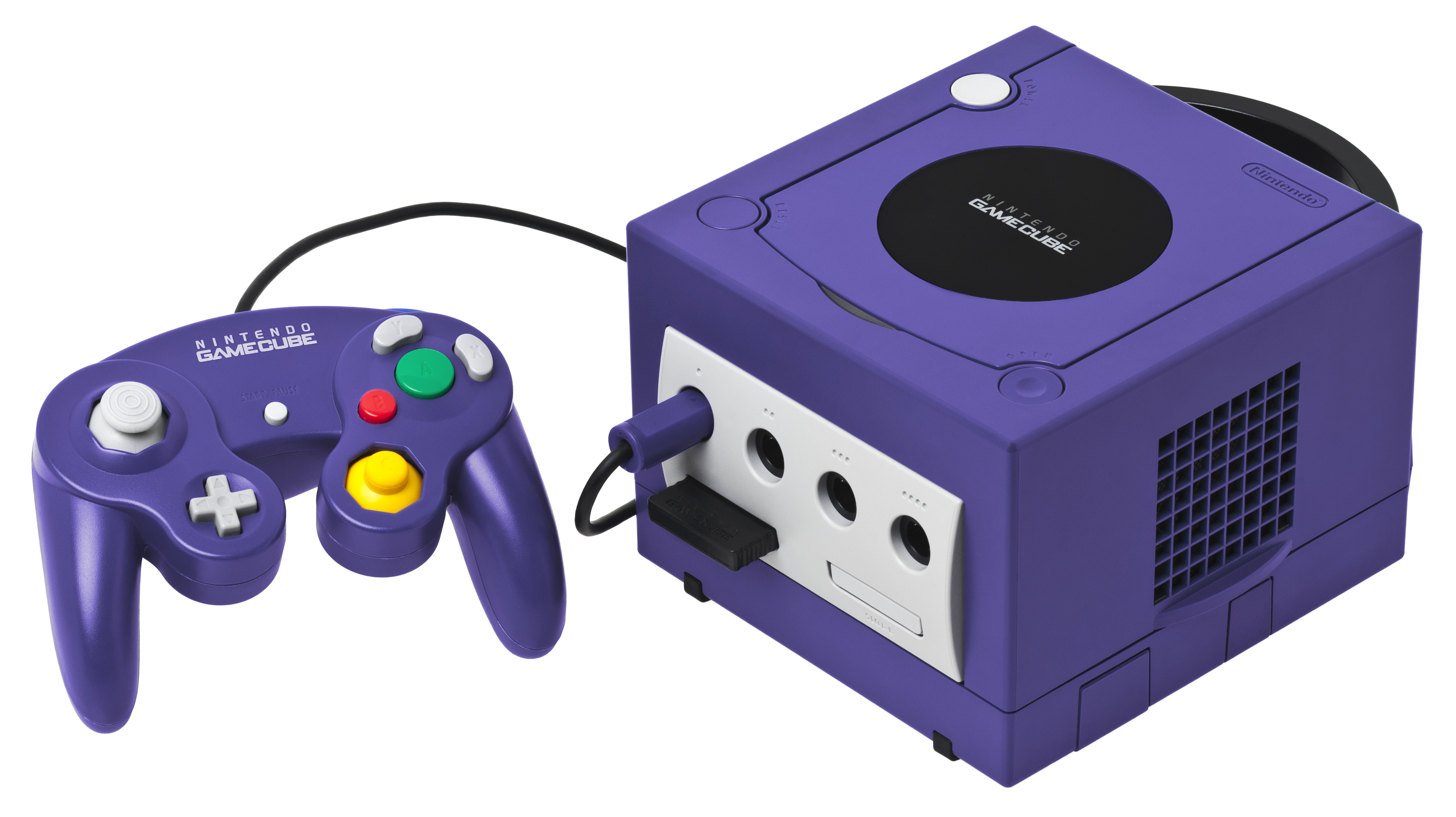
Subscribers to the premium "Expansion Pack" tier have access to games for the Nintendo 64, Sega Genesis (top row), Virtual Boy, Game Boy Advance (middle row), and GameCube (bottom row).

=== Nintendo 64 ===
Announced in a Nintendo Direct on September 23, 2021, Nintendo 64 (N64) games were added to the service worldwide with nine titles on October 25, 2021. Games are based on the NTSC releases using 60 Hz timing; select games also have the option to play the European versions which run at their original PAL 50 Hz speed, including those that support multiple languages. The app does not emulate the ability to save to a Controller Pak, meaning some games can only save progress through the use of save states. An update on June 5, 2025 added the ability to remap each game's control scheme. Players on the Nintendo Switch 2 are also able to rewind gameplay and apply a CRT filter. Games that received a Z rating from the Japanese CERO rating board or an M rating from the ESRB are available as part of a separate "18+" application in Japan or "Mature 17+" application in western regions. As of June 4, 2026, there are 45 (Note: 43 games in North America and PAL regions, nine of which are exclusive to these regions; 36 games in Japan, two of which are exclusive to this region.) games available, including the following:

List of Nintendo 64 games on Nintendo Classics
| Release date | Game | Publisher(s) | NA/PAL | JP |
|---|---|---|---|---|
| October 25, 2021 | Dr. Mario 64 | Nintendo | Yes | No |
| October 25, 2021 | The Legend of Zelda: Ocarina of Time (Note: Both the 60 Hz and the 50 Hz versions of this game are available.) | Nintendo | Yes | Yes |
| October 25, 2021 | Mario Kart 64 | Nintendo | Yes | Yes |
| October 25, 2021 | Mario Tennis | Nintendo | Yes | Yes |
| October 25, 2021 | Sin and Punishment | Nintendo | Yes | Yes |
| October 25, 2021 | Star Fox 64 | Nintendo | Yes | Yes |
| October 25, 2021 | Super Mario 64 | Nintendo | Yes | Yes |
| October 25, 2021 | WinBack | Koei Tecmo | Yes | Yes |
| October 25, 2021 | Yoshi's Story | Nintendo | Yes | Yes |
| December 10, 2021 | Paper Mario | Nintendo | Yes | Yes |
| January 20, 2022 | Banjo-Kazooie | Xbox Game Studios | Yes | Yes |
| February 25, 2022 | The Legend of Zelda: Majora's Mask | Nintendo | Yes | Yes |
| March 11, 2022 | F-Zero X | Nintendo | Yes | Yes |
| April 15, 2022 | Mario Golf | Nintendo | Yes | Yes |
| May 20, 2022 | Kirby 64: The Crystal Shards | Nintendo | Yes | Yes |
| June 24, 2022 | Pokémon Snap | Nintendo | Yes | Yes |
| July 15, 2022 | Custom Robo | Nintendo | No | Yes |
| July 15, 2022 | Custom Robo V2 | Nintendo | No | Yes |
| July 15, 2022 | Pokémon Puzzle League | Nintendo | Yes | No |
| August 19, 2022 | Wave Race 64 | Nintendo | Yes | Yes |
| October 13, 2022 | Pilotwings 64 | Nintendo | Yes | Yes |
| November 2, 2022 | Mario Party | Nintendo | Yes | Yes |
| November 2, 2022 | Mario Party 2 | Nintendo | Yes | Yes |
| January 27, 2023 | GoldenEye 007 (Note: Available in the Nintendo 64 18+ application in Japan) | Nintendo | Yes | Yes (Note: Originally exclusive to Western regions, but was eventually released in Japan on November 30, 2023.) |
| April 12, 2023 | Pokémon Stadium | Nintendo | Yes | Yes |
| August 8, 2023 | Pokémon Stadium 2 | Nintendo | Yes | Yes |
| August 30, 2023 | Excitebike 64 | Nintendo | Yes | Yes |
| October 27, 2023 | Mario Party 3 | Nintendo | Yes | Yes |
| November 30, 2023 | Jet Force Gemini | Xbox Game Studios | Yes (Note: Originally exclusive to Japan, but was eventually released in Western regions on December 8, 2023) | Yes |
| December 8, 2023 | 1080° Snowboarding | Nintendo | Yes | Yes |
| December 8, 2023 | Harvest Moon 64 | Natsume Inc. (Note: Published by Marvelous in Japan) | Yes | Yes |
| February 21, 2024 | Blast Corps | Xbox Game Studios (Note: Published by Nintendo in Japan.) | Yes | Yes (Note: Originally exclusive to Western regions, but was eventually released in Japan on April 24, 2024.) |
| April 24, 2024 | Extreme-G | Throwback Entertainment | Yes | No |
| April 24, 2024 | Iggy's Reckin' Balls | Throwback Entertainment | Yes | No |
| June 18, 2024 | Perfect Dark (Note: Available in the Nintendo 64 Mature 17+ application in western regions) | Xbox Game Studios | Yes | Yes |
| June 18, 2024 | Turok: Dinosaur Hunter | Nightdive Studios | Yes | Yes (Note: Originally exclusive to Western regions, but was eventually released in Japan on January 31, 2025) |
| October 25, 2024 | Banjo-Tooie | Xbox Game Studios | Yes | Yes |
| October 29, 2024 | Shadow Man | Nightdive Studios | Yes | No |
| October 29, 2024 | Turok 2: Seeds of Evil | Nightdive Studios | Yes | Yes |
| January 31, 2025 | Ridge Racer 64 | Nintendo | Yes | Yes (Note: Originally exclusive to Western regions, but was eventually released in Japan on May 16, 2025.) |
| May 16, 2025 | Killer Instinct Gold | Xbox Game Studios | Yes | No |
| September 4, 2025 | Forsaken 64 | Nightdive Studios | Yes | No |
| December 17, 2025 | Rayman 2: The Great Escape | Ubisoft | Yes | No |
| December 17, 2025 | Tonic Trouble | Ubisoft | Yes | No |
| June 4, 2026 | Donkey Kong 64 | Nintendo | Yes | Yes |

=== Sega Genesis / Mega Drive ===
Announced in a Nintendo Direct on September 23, 2021, Sega Genesis games were added to the service worldwide with 15 titles on October 25, 2021. It is the only third-party game system available on the service, and the only one to not carry the Nintendo Classics branding. As of April 11, 2025, there are 51 (Note: 50 games in North America and PAL regions, one of which is exclusive to these regions; 50 games in Japan, one of which is exclusive to this region.) games available, including the following:

List of Sega Genesis / Mega Drive games on Nintendo Classics
| Release date | Game | Publisher(s) | NA/PAL | JP |
|---|---|---|---|---|
| October 25, 2021 | Castlevania: Bloodlines | Konami | Yes | Yes |
| October 25, 2021 | Contra: Hard Corps | Konami | Yes | Yes |
| October 25, 2021 | Dr. Robotnik's Mean Bean Machine | Sega | Yes | No |
| October 25, 2021 | Ecco the Dolphin | Sega | Yes | Yes |
| October 25, 2021 | Golden Axe | Sega | Yes | Yes |
| October 25, 2021 | Gunstar Heroes | Sega | Yes | Yes |
| October 25, 2021 | MUSHA | Sega | Yes | Yes |
| October 25, 2021 | Phantasy Star IV | Sega | Yes | Yes |
| October 25, 2021 | Puyo Puyo | Sega | No | Yes |
| October 25, 2021 | Ristar | Sega | Yes | Yes |
| October 25, 2021 | Shining Force | Sega | Yes | Yes |
| October 25, 2021 | Shinobi III: Return of the Ninja Master | Sega | Yes | Yes |
| October 25, 2021 | Sonic the Hedgehog 2 | Sega | Yes | Yes |
| October 25, 2021 | Streets of Rage 2 | Sega | Yes | Yes |
| October 25, 2021 | Strider | Capcom | Yes | Yes |
| December 16, 2021 | Altered Beast | Sega | Yes | Yes |
| December 16, 2021 | Dynamite Headdy | Sega | Yes | Yes |
| December 16, 2021 | Sword of Vermilion | Sega | Yes | Yes |
| December 16, 2021 | Thunder Force II | Sega | Yes | Yes |
| December 16, 2021 | ToeJam & Earl | Sega | Yes | Yes |
| March 16, 2022 | Alien Soldier | Sega | Yes | Yes |
| March 16, 2022 | Light Crusader | Sega | Yes | Yes |
| March 16, 2022 | Super Fantasy Zone | Sunsoft/Sega | Yes | Yes |
| April 21, 2022 | Shining Force II | Sega | Yes | Yes |
| April 21, 2022 | Sonic Spinball | Sega | Yes | Yes |
| April 21, 2022 | Space Harrier II | Sega | Yes | Yes |
| June 30, 2022 | Comix Zone | Sega | Yes | Yes |
| June 30, 2022 | Mega Man: The Wily Wars | Capcom | Yes | Yes |
| June 30, 2022 | Target Earth | Extreme | Yes | Yes |
| June 30, 2022 | Zero Wing | Tatsujin | Yes | Yes |
| September 15, 2022 | Alisia Dragoon | Game Arts/Sega | Yes | Yes |
| September 15, 2022 | Beyond Oasis | Sega | Yes | Yes |
| September 15, 2022 | Earthworm Jim | Interplay Entertainment | Yes | Yes |
| December 15, 2022 | Alien Storm | Sega | Yes | Yes |
| December 15, 2022 | Columns | Sega | Yes | Yes |
| December 15, 2022 | Golden Axe II | Sega | Yes | Yes |
| December 15, 2022 | Virtua Fighter 2 | Sega | Yes | Yes |
| April 18, 2023 | Flicky | Sega | Yes | Yes |
| April 18, 2023 | Kid Chameleon | Sega | Yes | Yes |
| April 18, 2023 | Pulseman | Sega | Yes | Yes |
| April 18, 2023 | Street Fighter II': Special Champion Edition | Capcom | Yes | Yes |
| June 28, 2023 | Crusader of Centy | Sega | Yes | Yes |
| June 28, 2023 | Ghouls 'n Ghosts | Capcom | Yes | Yes |
| June 28, 2023 | Landstalker | Sega | Yes | Yes |
| June 28, 2023 | The Revenge of Shinobi | Sega | Yes | Yes |
| November 27, 2024 | Mercs | Capcom | Yes | Yes |
| November 27, 2024 | ToeJam & Earl in Panic on Funkotron | Sega | Yes | Yes |
| November 27, 2024 | Vectorman | Sega | Yes | Yes |
| April 11, 2025 | ESWAT: City Under Siege | Sega | Yes | Yes |
| April 11, 2025 | Streets of Rage | Sega | Yes | Yes |
| April 11, 2025 | Super Thunder Blade | Sega | Yes | Yes |

=== Game Boy Advance ===
Announced in a Nintendo Direct on February 8, 2023, Game Boy Advance (GBA) games were added to the service worldwide with six titles the same day. An update on September 4, 2025 added the ability to remap the in-game controls. As of October 14, 2026, there are 36 (Note: 32 games in North America and PAL regions, none of which are exclusive to these regions; 36 games in Japan, 4 of which are exclusive to this region.) games available, including the following:

List of Game Boy Advance games on Nintendo Classics
| Release date | Game | Publisher(s) | NA/PAL | JP |
|---|---|---|---|---|
| February 8, 2023 | Kuru Kuru Kururin | Nintendo | Yes | Yes |
| February 8, 2023 | The Legend of Zelda: The Minish Cap | Nintendo | Yes | Yes |
| February 8, 2023 | Mario & Luigi: Superstar Saga | Nintendo | Yes | Yes |
| February 8, 2023 | Mario Kart: Super Circuit | Nintendo | Yes | Yes |
| February 8, 2023 | Super Mario Advance 4: Super Mario Bros. 3 | Nintendo | Yes | Yes |
| February 8, 2023 | WarioWare, Inc.: Mega Microgames! | Nintendo | Yes | Yes |
| March 9, 2023 | Metroid Fusion | Nintendo | Yes | Yes |
| May 25, 2023 | Super Mario Advance | Nintendo | Yes | Yes |
| May 25, 2023 | Super Mario World: Super Mario Advance 2 | Nintendo | Yes | Yes |
| May 25, 2023 | Yoshi's Island: Super Mario Advance 3 | Nintendo | Yes | Yes |
| June 23, 2023 | Fire Emblem: The Binding Blade | Nintendo | No | Yes |
| June 23, 2023 | Fire Emblem: The Blazing Blade | Nintendo | Yes | Yes |
| September 29, 2023 | Kirby & the Amazing Mirror | Nintendo | Yes | Yes |
| January 17, 2024 | Golden Sun | Nintendo | Yes | Yes |
| January 17, 2024 | Golden Sun: The Lost Age | Nintendo | Yes | Yes |
| February 21, 2024 | Mother 3 | Nintendo | No | Yes |
| March 29, 2024 | F-Zero: Maximum Velocity | Nintendo | Yes | Yes |
| June 18, 2024 | The Legend of Zelda: A Link to the Past and Four Swords | Nintendo | Yes | Yes |
| June 18, 2024 | Metroid: Zero Mission | Nintendo | Yes | Yes |
| July 12, 2024 | Densetsu no Starfy (Note: Although available in the Western library, it is still only in its original Japanese language.) | Nintendo | Yes | Yes |
| July 12, 2024 | Densetsu no Starfy 2 | Nintendo | Yes | Yes |
| July 12, 2024 | Densetsu no Starfy 3 | Nintendo | Yes | Yes |
| August 9, 2024 | Pokémon Mystery Dungeon: Red Rescue Team | Nintendo (Note: Published by The Pokémon Company in Japan) | Yes | Yes |
| October 11, 2024 | F-Zero Climax | Nintendo | Yes | Yes |
| October 11, 2024 | F-Zero: GP Legend | Nintendo | Yes | Yes |
| February 14, 2025 | Wario Land 4 | Nintendo | Yes | Yes |
| April 22, 2025 | Fire Emblem: The Sacred Stones | Nintendo | Yes | Yes |
| September 4, 2025 | Magical Vacation | Nintendo | No | Yes |
| September 25, 2025 | Klonoa: Empire of Dreams | Bandai Namco Entertainment | Yes | Yes |
| September 25, 2025 | Mr. Driller 2 | Bandai Namco Entertainment | Yes | Yes |
| March 10, 2026 | Mario vs. Donkey Kong | Nintendo | Yes | Yes |
| July 8, 2026 | Dr. Mario & Puzzle League | Nintendo | Yes | Yes |
| July 8, 2026 | Tomato Adventure | Nintendo | No | Yes |
| October 14, 2026 | Kururin Paradise | Nintendo | Yes | Yes |
| October 14, 2026 | Metal Slug Advance | SNK | Yes | Yes |
| October 14, 2026 | Monster Rancher Advance | Koei Tecmo | Yes | Yes |

=== GameCube ===
GameCube (GCN) was added to the service with three games alongside the Nintendo Switch 2's launch on June 5, 2025. GameCube games are only available on Nintendo Switch 2. The emulator allows players to reassign buttons and customize controls for each game. Players are also able to control the games using original GameCube controllers via the GameCube Controller Adapter. As of September 9, 2026, there are 11 (Note: 11 games in North America and PAL regions, none of which are exclusive to these regions; 11 games in Japan, none of which are exclusive to this region.) games available, including the following:

List of GameCube games on Nintendo Classics
| Release date | Game | Publisher(s) | NA/PAL | JP |
|---|---|---|---|---|
| June 5, 2025 | F-Zero GX | Nintendo | Yes | Yes |
| June 5, 2025 | The Legend of Zelda: The Wind Waker | Nintendo | Yes | Yes |
| June 5, 2025 | Soulcalibur II | Bandai Namco Entertainment | Yes | Yes |
| July 3, 2025 | Super Mario Strikers | Nintendo | Yes | Yes |
| August 21, 2025 | Chibi-Robo! | Nintendo | Yes | Yes |
| October 30, 2025 | Luigi's Mansion | Nintendo | Yes | Yes |
| December 11, 2025 | Wario World | Nintendo | Yes | Yes |
| January 9, 2026 | Fire Emblem: Path of Radiance | Nintendo | Yes | Yes |
| March 18, 2026 | Pokémon XD: Gale of Darkness | Nintendo (Note: Published by The Pokémon Company in Japan) | Yes | Yes |
| August 13, 2026 | Super Mario Sunshine | Nintendo | Yes | Yes |
| September 9, 2026 | Star Fox Adventures | Nintendo | Yes | Yes |
| TBA | Pokémon Colosseum | Nintendo | Yes | Yes |

=== Virtual Boy ===
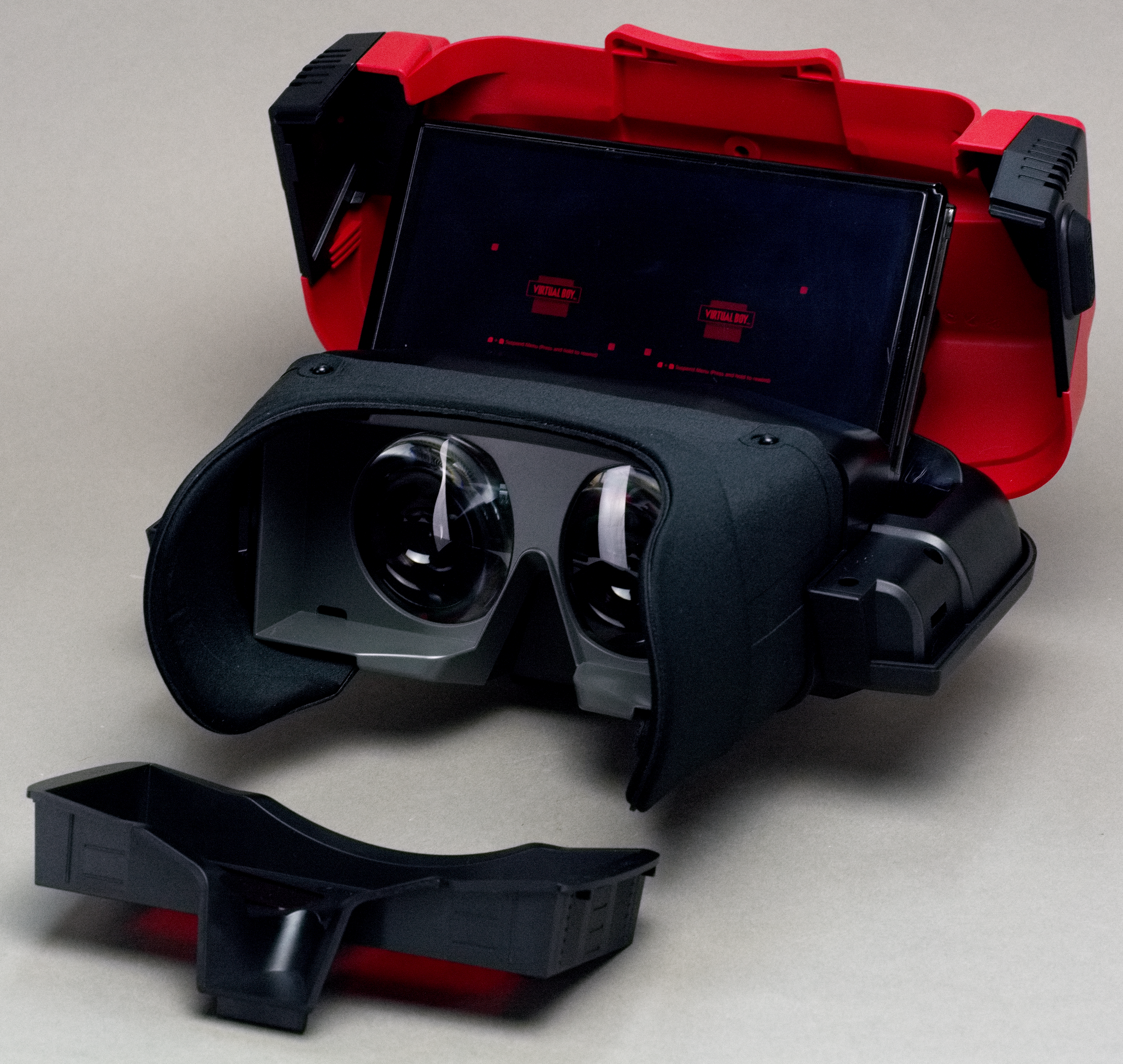
Main body of Virtual Boy replica in the open position, showing the removable red lenses, with an OLED Switch going into the slot, showing the two separate images of the Virtual Boy boot screen

Announced in a Nintendo Direct on September 12, 2025, Virtual Boy (VB) games were added to the service on February 17, 2026, with seven games available at launch. The games display two separate images on either side of the screen to recreate the stereoscopic 3D effect of the original system. The games cannot be displayed in full screen or played while the system is docked, and require the use of an additional headset accessory for proper play. The accessory is available in two formats: a plastic mount based on the original system, and a cardboard sleeve. While not officially supported, the Virtual Boy headsets are also compatible with games that supported the Nintendo Labo VR Kit and vice versa. Players can adjust the screen size and inter-pupillary distance of the display to refine the 3D effect. An update to the application on August 4, 2026, added the ability to view the games in other colors. In addition to released games, the Virtual Boy library includes a pair of previously unreleased games, Dragon Hopper and Zero Racers. As of August 4, 2026, there are 17 (Note: 16 games in North America and PAL regions, none of which are exclusive to these regions; 17 games in Japan, one of which is exclusive to this region.) games available, including the following:

List of Virtual Boy games on Nintendo Classics
| Release date | Game | Publisher(s) | NA/PAL | JP |
|---|---|---|---|---|
| February 17, 2026 | 3D Tetris | Nintendo (Note: Published by T&E Soft in Japan) | Yes | Yes |
| February 17, 2026 | Galactic Pinball | Nintendo | Yes | Yes |
| February 17, 2026 | Golf | Nintendo | Yes | Yes |
| February 17, 2026 | The Mansion of Innsmouth | I'MAX | Yes | Yes |
| February 17, 2026 | Red Alarm | Nintendo | Yes | Yes |
| February 17, 2026 | Teleroboxer | Nintendo | Yes | Yes |
| February 17, 2026 | Virtual Boy Wario Land | Nintendo | Yes | Yes |
| March 10, 2026 | Mario Clash | Nintendo | Yes | Yes |
| March 10, 2026 | Mario's Tennis | Nintendo | Yes | Yes |
| May 14, 2026 | Jack Bros. | Atlus | Yes | Yes |
| May 14, 2026 | Space Invaders Virtual Collection | Taito | Yes | Yes |
| May 14, 2026 | V-Tetris | Bullet-Proof Software | Yes | Yes |
| May 14, 2026 | Vertical Force | Nintendo (Note: Published by Konami in Japan) | Yes | Yes |
| May 14, 2026 | Virtual Bowling | Athena | Yes | Yes |
| May 14, 2026 | Virtual Fishing | Pack-In-Video | No | Yes |
| August 4, 2026 | Dragon Hopper | Nintendo | Yes | Yes |
| August 4, 2026 | Zero Racers | Nintendo | Yes | Yes |

== See also ==
- Arcade Archives
- Sega Ages
- Virtual Console
