= Nintendo Fun Club =

Former Nintendo fan club

- Nintendo Fun Club News, issue 3
- Categories: Video games
- Frequency: Bimonthly
- Publisher: Nintendo
- First issue: January 1987; 39 years ago
- Final issue: July 1988; 38 years ago
- Company: Nintendo
- Country: United States
- Based in: Redmond, Washington, U.S.
- Language: English

Nintendo Fun Club was a fan club marketed by Nintendo. It was free to join, and its members received a free subscription to Nintendo Fun Club News, a periodical that discussed popular games and games that were planned for the near future. It also offered tips and tricks, Nintendo video game news, and comics.

== History ==
IGN credited Bergsala's Nintendo Videospelklubb, a Swedish children loyalty club that was one of similar European Nintendo distributor clubs, as the inspiration for the club.

Since the NES's launch in 1985, warehouse manager and gamer advocate Howard Phillips and marketer Gail Tilden had operated a consumer feedback campaign of insert cards within packages of Nintendo's hardware and games, and built a database of customer contact information with names and mailing addresses. Phillips started a free-of-charge gameplay advice hotline at Nintendo of America, with five or six counselors on staff. They wanted to consolidate this resource-intensive gameplay counseling into mass media form. Phillips said, "When we first launched the NES in 1985, we figured out very quickly that kids were just dying to get extra information about the games—not just new games that were coming out, but also how to play them."

In 1987, Nintendo Fun Club was started at Nintendo of America by Gail Tilden and Fun Club President Howard Phillips, with the publication of the Nintendo Fun Club News. The newsletter's first four issues were delivered quarterly starting in early 1987, with the final three issues being bimonthly. Phillips said, "Kids loved the magazine because it included screen shots. Pre-internet and VCRs, actually showing kids the games was the only way to explain how to do tricks. They couldn't just look it up online."

The Nintendo Fun Club was marketed via catalogs and flyers contained in Nintendo Entertainment System boxes, and within the content of at least one game, Mike Tyson's Punch-Out!!. During the intermissions between rounds, when Little Mac's trainer gives him tips, Mac calls out "Help, Doc", who responds with, "Join the Nintendo Fun Club today! Mac. [sic]" In Punch-Out!! for the Wii, upon winning a fight, one of the lines Doc can say begins with "Join the Nintendo Fun...", before he stops himself and says "I mean, Club Nintendo today, Mac!"

After seven issues and 600,000 subscribers, along with more than 100 telephone gameplay counselors, Phillips and Tilden wanted to further streamline and expand the resource intensive and non-revenue-generating marketing outreach. The Nintendo Fun Club News was discontinued in favor of the vastly more expansive and ambitious Nintendo Power magazine in August 1988. Its first issue was free to Fun Club members; a paid subscription was required to continue.

== See also ==
- Official Nintendo Magazine, the official British magazine and successor to the British Club Nintendo
- Nintendo Magazine System, the Australian equivalent publication
- History of computer and video games
- Nintendo Player's Guide
