= GameDuell =

German video game company

- Logo
- Type: Limited liability company
- Industry: Interactive entertainment
- Founded: 2003; 23 years ago
- Founder: Kai Bolik, CEO; Boris Wasmuth, CMO; Michael Kalkowski
- Headquarters: Berlin, Germany
- Number of employees: 130 (2024)
- Parent: Mobile Premier League
- Website: inside.gameduell.com

GameDuell is a German cross-platform games community headquartered in Berlin, Germany. It operates over 70 games in seven languages with over 130 million users. The company produces and distributes digital card and board games, action arcade games, as well as puzzle games for the web and social and mobile platforms. Some of the company's games include Fluffy Birds, Maya Pyramid, Bubble Speed, Jungle Jewels, Grand Gin Rummy and Belote.

== History ==
GameDuell was founded in December 2003 by Kai Bolik, Michael Kalkowski and Boris Wasmuth. In 2004, GameDuell raised a funding round led by Holtzbrinck Ventures and Burda Digital Ventures. The company raised a $17 million in a second round of funding in July 2008 from Wellington Partners. In 2008, GameDuell expanded into North America and opened an office in San Francisco. The company released its first Facebook game, Bubble Popp, in 2009 and its first iOS mobile game, Jungle Jewels, in 2010. Jungle Jewels was also released for Android in 2011.

By 2013, the company had produced more than 70 online games in German, French, English, Dutch, Swedish, Danish and Spanish, and had a user base of 80 million players.

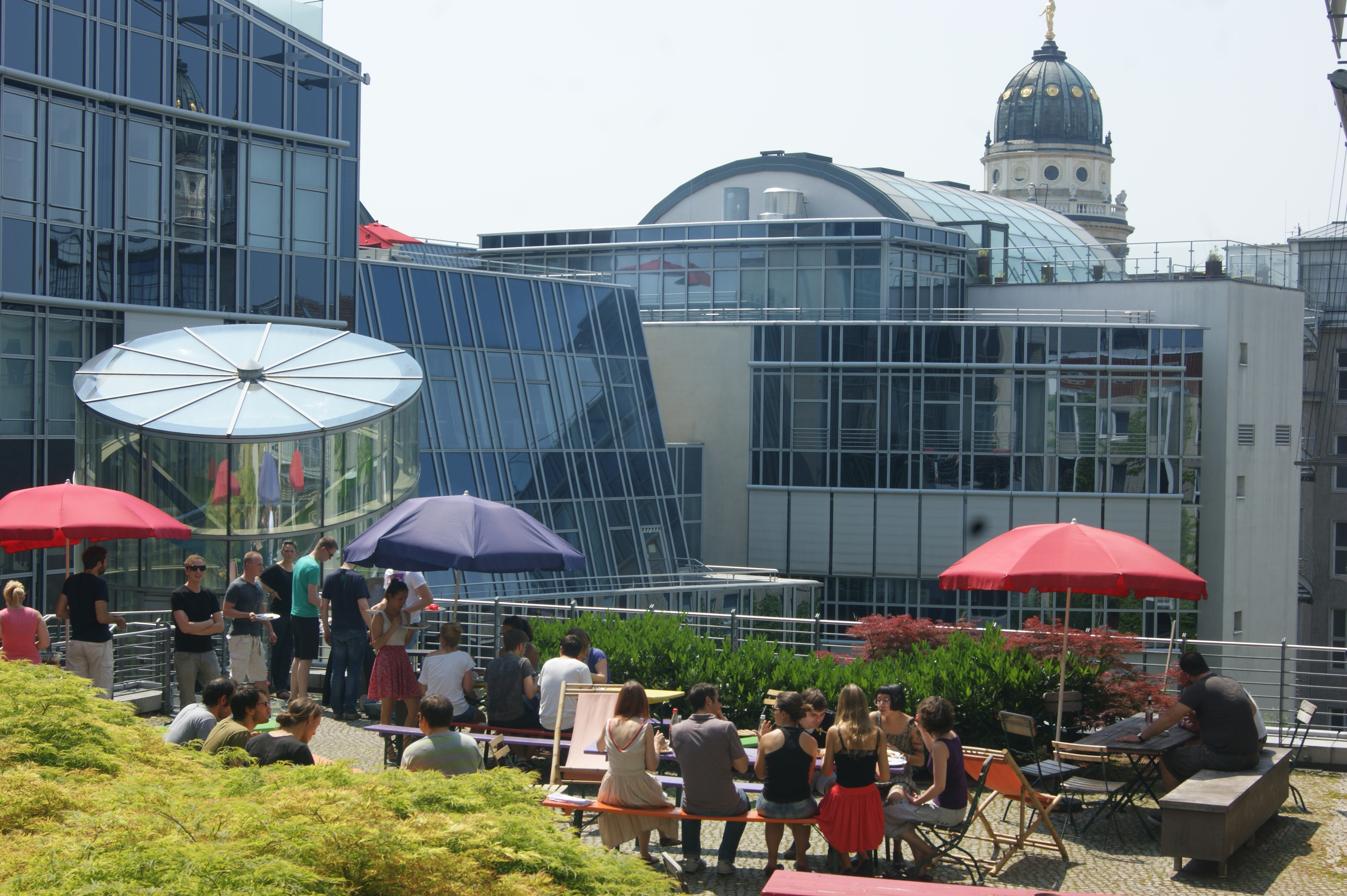
GameDuell headquarters

In 2014, the company changed its logo to reflect "passion for game development and game experience." In February 2014, former PopCap studio director Todd English joined GameDuell as head of studio for social and mobile games, and Ian J. Bowden, co-founder of Rockstar Leeds, became art director at GameDuell in August 2014. While at Rockstar, Bowden worked on the Grand Theft Auto game series, L.A. Noire, Red Dead Redemption and Max Payne 3. GameDuell released the French card game Belote.com in 2014 with cross-platform functionality. Later that same year, GameDuell launched the Belote.com world tournaments ("Coupe Du Monde"). In June 2015, Howard Phillips became GameDuell's head of game design and user experience. Phillips previously worked for Nintendo, THQ, Microsoft, and was studio director at Chair Entertainment.

In March 2016, GameDuell released Grand Gin Rummy, its digital adaptation of the traditional gin rummy card game. The company's cross-platform game engine makes the game playable across iOS and Android smartphones and tablets. It was additionally released on Facebook in April 2016.

GameDuell is a member of the industry association media.net Berlin Brandenburg and member of the German game developers association, GAME. As of July 2018, the company employs 150 people. Mobile Premier League acquired GameDuell in February 2022.

== Operations ==
GameDuell operates a dedicated cross-platform game server with an open cross-platform development toolkit written in programming language Haxe. By 2016, GameDuell had over 130 million users and 70 games produced in seven languages.

GameDuell hosts the "Skat Masters", the world's largest Skat tournament, every year with the support of the German Skat Association.
