= 3D Tetris =

1996 puzzle video game

- North American box art
- Developer: T&E Soft
- Publisher: Nintendo of America
- Series: Tetris
- Platform: Virtual Boy
- Release: NA: March 22, 1996
- Genre: Puzzle
- Mode: Single-player

3D Tetris is a 1996 puzzle video game developed by T&E Soft and published by Nintendo for the Virtual Boy. It was released on March 22, 1996, only in North America, and was the final game released for the system before it was discontinued. Players control multiple falling blocks, rotating and positioning them to clear layers in a three-dimensional environment similar to Tetris's gameplay. The game contains multiple modes and variations thereof, as well as different difficulty settings and levels. Parts of 3D Tetris are rendered as 3D wire-frame models. A version of the game entitled Polygo Block (Note: Japanese: ポリゴブロック, Hepburn: Porigo Burokku) was set for release in February 1996 in Japanese markets, but was never released. The game received mostly negative reviews with critics panning it for a lack of originality.

== Gameplay ==
Players move falling blocks to fill up a three-dimensional well.

3D Tetris is a puzzle game that uses a three-dimensional playing field as opposed to the traditional two dimensions used in most other versions of Tetris. The play field, called a well, contains 5 vertical layers that players fill with falling three-dimensional blocks. These blocks can be rotated horizontally and vertically, as well as positioned in four different directions. Each block displays a shadow underneath it which indicates where it will land. The game's camera continually adjusts itself, but players can manually readjust it. The HUD displays a radar which provides information about each of the well's five layers, as well as the next block to fall, which is represented by a character. The game contains multiple different modes: 3-D Tetris, Center-Fill, and Puzzle, each having variations in how they play. Players can modify the difficulty in these modes as well as the rate by which the blocks fall.

In the 3-D Tetris mode, a layer disappears when it is filled with blocks, scoring players points which are displayed in the HUD. If blocks stack over the top of the well, the number of layers will go down by one. The game is over when the final layer is lost. One game mode is based on accumulating points, while the other mode requires players to complete multiple levels by clearing all five layers in each. In the Center-Fill mode, players place blocks in symmetrical patterns around center blocks placed in each well's layers. If a block is placed in a layer's center block, it disappears, and any other blocks in the layer will also disappear, if they have been successfully placed in a symmetrical pattern. Points are gained based on the number of blocks in, the complexity of, and the height of the symmetrical layer. A symmetrical pattern is indicated by a symbol shown in the HUD's radar, as well as the player's score. Like the 3-D Tetris mode, layers will be lost if the blocks go over the top of the well, and the game ends when all layers are lost. One variant requires players to complete as many layers as possible, while the other is the same except with obstacles added. The variant Clear It! requires players to clear ten symmetrical layers on each stage to progress to the next stage. In the Puzzle mode, a shape is displayed in the well at the beginning of each stage. Players are tasked with getting to the highest stage possible by placing blocks in the displayed shape to progress to the next stage. At the end of each stage, a stage-ending animation is displayed. If an incorrect shape is placed, the game ends. 3D Tetris includes an option to save high scores and names entered from the 3-D Tetris and Center-Fill modes, along with progress in the Puzzle mode, to a battery backup.

== Development and release ==
3D Tetris was developed by T&E Soft and published by Nintendo in North America. A version was planned for Japanese markets entitled Polygo Block, which was to be released in February 1996, but was never released. Like all other Virtual Boy games, 3D Tetris uses a red-and-black color scheme and uses parallax, an optical trick that is used to simulate a 3D effect. The game contains 30 different block types, and renders each one as a 3D wire-frame model until they fall to the bottom of the well, where they are filled in. It was the last game to be released for the Virtual Boy in North America and the last game released overall for the system.

3D Tetris was added to the Nintendo Classics service, including in Japan for the first time under its transliterated American title, on February 17, 2026. D4 Enterprise owns the rights to the game, having acquired T&E Soft's trademark and intellectual property in 2019.

== Reception ==
Reception

Review scores
Publication	Score
Game Informer	6/10
Next Generation	1/5
Nintendo Life	8/10
Entertainment Weekly	D

3D Tetris received mostly negative reviews. One common criticism was over the game's 3D perspective and red-and-black visuals. Entertainment Weekly staff experienced eye strain while playing the game, while writer Jeremy Parish experienced headaches. Aaron Curtiss of the Los Angeles Times felt that the 3D effects clashed with the Virtual Boy's visuals, while GamePro writer Scary Larry found its audio and visual presentation minimal. GamesRadar+ writer Brett Elston found it difficult to tell what was happening because of the visuals. While Next Generation staff argued that all game modes missed the mark due to lacking the "simple elegance" of Tetris, VideoGames staff was less critical. They felt it was less appealing than Tetris due to the 3D effect, but nevertheless executed well.

The controls and gameplay received a mixed response. Aaron Curtiss felt the way the play field moved was difficult and frustrating, identifying the controls as difficult, a sentiment shared by Scary Larry. However, Larry felt that the game had the potential to be addictive. Staff for Game Informer argued that a 3D Tetris had potential, but it was not executed well, criticizing its slow pace. Jeremy Parish also found pace issues with the game, adding that it also had issues with being too complex. Dave Frear of Nintendo Life agreed that it started out too slowly, but noted that pace increase in higher difficulties made it much more fun.

== See also ==
- List of Virtual Boy games
- Blockout
- V-Tetris
- Welltris
