= Howard Phillips (consultant) =

American video game consultant and producer

- Born: January 23, 1958 (age 68)
- Occupations: Warehouse manager, spokesperson, magazine editor, consultant
- Years active: 1973–2017
- Employer: Nintendo of America (1981–1991)
- Notable work: Nintendo Power magazine (co-editor)
- Title: Game Master, Director of Game Creative
- Children: Alexandra and Katherine Phillips
- Website: Howard Phillips on Facebook

Howard Phillips (born January 23, 1958) is an American video game consultant and producer who was an early employee of and spokesman for Nintendo of America in the 1980s.

Initially a boat painter, Phillips started his video game career as manager of Nintendo of America's first Tukwila warehouse in 1981. He managed relations with the retail sites of the 1985 test launch of the Nintendo Entertainment System, gaining insight into which games were popular. Because of his gameplay aptitude and formative experience in Nintendo's then-nascent expansion in North America, his roles grew to spokesperson, manager of the Game Counselor hotline, and co-editor of Nintendo Power magazine. After leaving Nintendo in 1991, his video game work included Microsoft, Chair Entertainment, and GameDuell.

== Early life ==
Howard Phillips was raised to make his own fun, saying "we weren't poor, but back then parents didn't bury kids in toys ... so we were constantly making things to play with, on, in, or around." With industrious use of neighborhood scrap materials, he made and remade forts and treehouses. He made an electromechanical "arcade game made from clock motors and an old world globe".

Initially a fan of pinball, he was an adolescent video game fanatic through the golden age of arcade video games, about age 13 with the advent of Pong (1971) and entering his twenties at the time of the Atari 2600 home console (1977) and the Space Invaders (1978) arcade game. He would later summarize his favorite thing about video games: "Play. Simple play. And the ability to share play with others either cooperatively, competitively, or just sharing game experiences, such as tips, news and rumors."

But after you play a bunch of [novelty Atari 2600] stick figure baseball games with your buddies, you realize well, OK, we kind of exhausted ourselves pretty quick on that. And then it's on to the next arcade game, as opposed to the next crappy Atari game that's coming out. ... [Atari 2600 adaptations] were not even close to what they were in the arcade. And the arcades were interesting and cool and, you know, what's new and hip.

— Howard Phillips

He graduated from the University of Washington and continued living in the Seattle area. He was a trade painter, including boats. He had some experience in restaurant management.

== Career ==
=== Nintendo ===
==== Warehousing and testing ====
Phillips was in between jobs when he saw a Nintendo job listing in The Seattle Times that read: "Have Fun And Play Games for a Living". Phillips didn't apply for the job, instead being invited by former college friend and current Nintendo employee of one month, Don James. This began his video game career in 1981 at age 22 as the fifth employee of Nintendo of America by managing its first warehouse in Tukwila, Washington.

Already an avid gamer, as manager of the 60,000 foot warehouse he eagerly took a privileged first look at each new product from Nintendo's headquarters in Japan, in a receiving and testing process which he considered "a little bit like Christmas". He recalled, "I really love games of all types so every day was really fun." These first arcade games include Sky Skipper (1981), Popeye (1982), Donkey Kong Jr. (1982), Mario Bros. (1983), Donkey Kong 3 (1984), Punch-Out!! (1984), VS. System (1984), and the smash hit Donkey Kong (1981). He was personally involved in receiving from Japan and delivering to American arcades the 60,000 cabinet machines (4,000 per month) of Donkey Kong alone that made the first fortune of Nintendo of America, totaling $180 million in the game's first year. At age 24, he was "the largest volume shipping manager for the entire Port of Seattle, having over 100 40' shipping containers full of games arrive every day and needing to be shipped out by late in the night." Running the warehouse hand truck like a competitively timed game to unload 11,000 pounds of 44 arcade cabinets in 9.5 minutes, he then reloaded, delivered, and repaired machines in the field, such as "behind the hotdog machine at the 7-Eleven".

He managed the test sites of each arcade launch, so along the way, he took the liberty of gathering owner feedback and observing the gameplay of audiences, especially children. He said, "I took it as a chance to watch kids play and see what they liked and didn't like so I could pass that information on to Mr. Arakawa. I would also give them pointers on how to improve." He was regularly and candidly consulted by Nintendo of America's cofounders—salespeople Ron Judy and Al Stone, and president Minoru Arakawa, all of whom rarely played video games—about the players' preferences about Nintendo's and competitors' games, and the daily cash intake from each Nintendo game.

==== Nintendo Entertainment System launch ====
I plugged [the Famicom] in, and all of a sudden there were the arcade games we had been playing in these big 250-pound boxes, and putting in quarters every time. But with the Famicom system, you could just keep playing and playing and playing. And that was just such an amazing, cool thing. That was a big 'whoop' moment for us.

— Howard Phillips

At his warehouse, Phillips excitedly discovered the Japanese import of Nintendo's new arcade-capable Famicom home video game console in mid-1983. His avid gameplay skills, intuition, and market research made him a primary advisor to the Japan-based Shigeru Miyamoto and company, on how to approach and develop the nascent American market which was suffering the disastrous 1983 video game crash.

Phillips was instrumental throughout the 1985—1986 launch of the Nintendo Entertainment System (NES). As part of the 12-person "Nintendo SWAT team" who moved to New York City in late 1985, he worked "every waking hour ... at the crack of dawn ... seven days a week". He chose the game library for the NES's launch, gave live product demonstrations, interacted with thousands of players, set up retail store displays designed by Don James and Gail Tilden, and managed relations with the retail test launch sites. He wrote the elaborate script that demonstrators would read while articulating the centerpiece R.O.B. toy robot which was key to the NES launch success.

With this cumulative knowledge, with his deep expertise in the entire Nintendo video game library, and being aged between the target child and their parents, he became a core liaison between the Japanese developers at Nintendo Co., Ltd. and the American video game player market for the rest of his tenure.

==== Game Master persona and mass marketing ====
Phillips was known as the Game Master. He said, "I was so immersed in Nintendo's games, and those of our competitors, that I literally knew more about them than anyone else". Due to his enthusiasm, Philips helped establish and manage the Game Counselor toll-free telephone number, where callers could ask Nintendo employees for help with gameplay. In late 1987, he and marketer Gail Tilden consolidated and expanded this expensive practice into mass media form by creating the free-of-charge Nintendo Fun Club of which he was the President, and whose members received the complimentary Nintendo Fun Club News. The modest but energetic newsletter achieved 600,000 subscribers, and its seventh and final issue is dated July 1988.

The Nintendo Fun Club and the Nintendo Fun Club News were canceled in favor of the much more expansive Nintendo Power magazine, with the first issue in August 1988. Phillips was co-editor and gameplay fact checker. Because the Nintendo of America subsidiary was such a small company, where "everybody does everything" and "everybody worked together", Phillips was still the warehouse manager even with all these additional roles and regular flights to Japan.

Nintendo Power features the Howard and Nester comic strip series which caricaturizes his real self in cartoon form, opposite an archetypal fictional boy who symbolizes all the Nintendo playing children of the world, and gave Phillips a direct voice to audience's homes. Phillips grew to become an industry personality, a lifestyle spokesperson, and advocate for the American gaming community. He said this:

When we first launched the NES in 1985, we figured out very quickly that kids were just dying to get extra information about the games—not just new games that were coming out, but also how to play them. Kids loved the magazine because it included screen shots. Pre-internet and VCRs, actually showing kids the games was the only way to explain how to do tricks. They couldn't just look it up online. Gail [Tilden] was really the driving force behind [Nintendo Power]. I was more of a player's advocate for things that had to do with games specifically, like which ones were cool and why they were cool. When we were doing press checks, I would always [fix accidents] like, "This screen is mirrored", or "This guy isn't in this area of the game." I made sure it was accurate so that it wouldn't cause more grief to send it out to all of the kids.

==== Game development ====
Phillips was executive producer of all second-party games from Nintendo's partners such as Rare, where he and developers Tim and Chris Stamper yielded Slalom (1987), R.C. Pro-Am (1988), and Snake Rattle 'n' Roll (1991). He was promoted to director of Game Creative in 1989. He "managed the game evaluation system which reviewed all the games using professional game players, the game counselors, and real players who came in to our lab to play new games". He helped to translate Nintendo's incoming Japanese Famicom games to the NES. He advised them on the renaming of characters, and adjusting the difficulty of game progression and the amount and type of in-game help. He had frequent faxes about incoming shipments from the Japan headquarters, and from Shigeru Miyamoto with game questions. He made public relations appearances at events such as Nintendo World Championships, press interviews on television and phone, monthly week-long press checks in Tokyo, and occasional product presentations such as the prototype of the Nintendo Knitting Machine proposed to Toys "R" Us.

He constantly played new games for hours on any given day.

==== Leaving Nintendo ====
In 1991, the parent company Nintendo Co., Ltd. was Japan's most successful company, the Super NES was being launched in America, Nintendo was on track to soon become more singularly valuable than all Hollywood movie studios combined, and there were more than 1 million Nintendo Power subscriptions bearing the celebrity of Howard Phillips. At this time, he left Nintendo of America after 10 years and at age 32. Nintendo Power ran an official farewell to Phillips in the final episode of the Howard and Nester comic strip, in which Howard hands his bowtie to Nester and rides his horse into the sunset.

He explained this:

It was like the dotcom boom but obviously well before that. It was the beginning of the tech age. My skill, which was that I knew every game, wasn't possible [anymore] by the time I left. It was quite a bummer. It wasn't that it stopped or slowed down, it was more that the public figure stuff started demanding way too much of my time. The new non-gamer marketing guy hired from Colgate (the toothpaste company) wanted 100% of my time (understandably so) and so it got harder and harder to stay close to the games. ... Also, after ten years Nintendo had grown to be 1,000+ people and just wasn't as much fun as it had been during the early days. Ultimately that's why I left Nintendo in 1991 – I wanted to focus 100% of my energies on making great games.

On the disturbing new wave of ultraviolent video games afforded by 1990s technology, and the disruptiveness of his celebrity status, he said this: "I had a totally different feeling watching a 7-year-old play Killer Instinct than I did watching a 7-year-old play Super Mario. ... I wanted to spend more time working on games themselves, and making people happy because of the games, not because I would leave my wife and kids in the car at the gas station while I talked to [a fan] and their kids for ten minutes."

=== After Nintendo ===
Phillips was recruited to leave Nintendo and join LucasArts in 1991. There, he served as either producer, executive producer, designer, or creative director for each of approximately 167 educational games, some of which were published by JVC. He said, "The GM at Lucasfilm games Steve Arnold offered me a compelling role running both their nascent Learning Group as well as launching their Videogame Group (they had been exclusively PC games)."

Phillips in the mid 1990s had been in discussions with Sega of America's CEO Tom Kalinske about joining former employer Nintendo's longtime rival as their new spokesperson. While initially interested, he decided not to join Sega.

He then worked for THQ, Absolute Entertainment, and Splash Studios. In 1997, he was hired by Microsoft to be the playtest manager for the entertainment division. In 2009, he joined Chair Entertainment as a studio director.

In 2012, he launched a Kickstarter campaign to help fund a new independent project, a mobile application called Know-It-All. It was inspired by the cognitive and learning sciences behind gaming, to help people to memorize and learn information. The project did not meet its US$50,000 fundraising goal.

Phillips was hired as the head of game design and user experience for GameDuell in June 2015.

== Personal life ==
Howard Phillips has a wife Dayna and two daughters, Alexandra and Katherine.

His all-time favorite video game system is the NES. His favorite arcade games are Donkey Kong (1981) and Robotron: 2084 (1982). His favorite console games are Super Mario Bros., Metroid, and The Legend of Zelda—the latter being his single favorite because it made the game industry's historically biggest leap forward of "depth, progression, and surprises".

== Legacy ==
Kotaku called Howard Phillips "one of the company's most high-profile and best-loved employees, his trademark red hair and bowtie making him as much a mascot of Nintendo's early success as any plumber or kid in a green tunic".

Nintendo Power functioned as a podcast until 2023, having discontinued the multi-million-subscriber magazine format as an industry legacy.

Phillips remains an industry luminary—making event appearances, interviews, and showcasing his extensive vintage collections of Nintendo memorabilia. He has parted out some of this collection. He has pledged to donate part to the Video Game History Foundation, to which he recruits and facilitates other major collectors from his decades of substantial industry contacts. Some of the collection such as Nintendo brochures, advertisements, and internal memorandums, are photographed on his own Facebook display and in media articles, and some have been sold. In 2013, he sold his 1990 Nintendo World Championships package for US$17,367 on eBay, hoping to reach an enthusiastic collector.

== See also ==
- Tom Kalinske, spokesperson of the competing Sega
