= Nintendo Power =

American video game magazine and podcast (1988–2012)

- First issue, July/August 1988
- Editor-in-Chief: Steve Thomason
- Former editors: Chris Slate
- Staff writers: Phil Theobald; Justin Cheng; Chris Hoffman
- Categories: Video games
- Frequency: 6x annually; monthly beginning January 1991
- Format: Magazine
- Circulation: 475,000 (2012)
- First issue: July/August 1988; 38 years ago
- Final issue Number: December 11, 2012; 285
- Company: Nintendo of America (1988–2007); Future US (2007–2012)
- Country: United States, Canada
- Based in: San Francisco, California, U.S.
- Language: English
- Website: nintendopower.com at the Wayback Machine (archived March 19, 2015)
- ISSN: 1041-9551
- OCLC: 760783416

Nintendo Power was a video game news and strategy magazine from Nintendo of America, first published in July/August 1988 as Nintendo's official print magazine for North America. The magazine's publication was initially done monthly by Nintendo of America, then independently, and in December 2007 contracted to Future US, the American subsidiary of British publisher Future plc. Its 24-year production run is one of the longest of all video game magazines in the United States and Canada.

On August 21, 2012, Nintendo announced that it would not be renewing its licensing agreement with Future Publishing, and that Nintendo Power would cease publication in December. The final issue, volume 285, was released on December 11, 2012.

On December 20, 2017, a podcast version of Nintendo Power was launched, which ran until 2023. It was hosted by Chris Slate, the former editor-in-chief of the magazine.

== History ==
Nintendo Fun Club News preceded Nintendo Power as a newsletter sent to club members for free. In mid-1988 it was discontinued after seven issues in favor of Nintendo Power. The new magazine was founded by Nintendo of America marketing manager Gail Tilden in 1988. The first issue, dated July/August 1988, spotlights the NES game Super Mario Bros. 2. Of this issue, 3.6 million copies were published, with every member of the Nintendo Fun Club receiving a free copy.

From the beginning, Nintendo Power focuses heavily on providing game strategy, reviews, and previews of upcoming games. In mid-1998, Nintendo Power first allowed outside advertising in the magazine, formerly reserved for Nintendo-based products only. In its early years, ads only appeared in the first and last few pages of the magazine, leaving no ads to break up the magazine's editorial content.

In July 2005, Nintendo Power introduced a new design to appeal to a limited gaming audience, including a new logo and article format. Along with the cosmetic overhaul came a greater focus on Nintendo fans, staff reviews, rumor-milling, and fan service including an expanded and enhanced reader mail segment (known as "Pulse") and a revamped "Community" section. Nintendo introduced a new incentive promotional offer that involved the registration of three Nintendo (or Nintendo-affiliated) products through Nintendo.com to receive a free three issue trial subscription to Nintendo Power. Later, the magazine changed its focus from game strategies and cheat codes to mainly news, previews, and articles on upcoming games.

On September 19, 2007, Nintendo officially announced that the large magazine publisher Future US would begin publishing Nintendo Power. The company's first official issue was released in October, as issue #222 (December 2007). It was also revealed that circulation would be increased to 13 issues a year, with the extra magazine being a holiday season bonus issue. Nintendo Power stopped making the Bonus issue in 2011.

On August 21, 2012, Nintendo announced that it had opted not to renew the licensing agreement with Future Publishing and that Nintendo Power would cease publication after 24 years. The final issue would be December 2012. Senior Editor Chris Hoffman stated that his staff would "try to make the last issues memorable". Nintendo reportedly did not actively participate in discussions to continue the magazine online.

Nintendo Power officially returned on December 20, 2017 as a podcast; the podcast uses the original logo design.

== Format ==
The final issue, December 2012, based on New Super Mario Bros. U, paying homage to the first issue's cover picture

The magazine was founded by Gail Tilden with support from Nintendo's first Fun Club "President" Howard Phillips, an avid gamer. While the Fun Club News focused solely on games made in-house by Nintendo, Nintendo Power was created to allow for reviews of games produced by those licensed by Nintendo, such as Konami and Capcom. Nintendo Power's mascot in the late 1980s and early 1990s was Nester, a character created by the staff at Work House, Japan who first appeared in the magazine's Howard and Nester comic strip. After Phillips left the company, Nester became the magazine's sole mascot. Early issues of the magazine featured a two-page Howard and Nester comic, which was later replaced with the two-page Nester's Adventures, later reduced to one page, and eventually dropped altogether. Subsequently, Mario replaced Nester as the mascot of the magazine. During the early 2000s, the magazine made another mascot out of its Senior Writer, Alan Averill. Apparently very camera-shy, Averill never appeared in any photos; rather, he was represented by a plush toy of a Blue Slime from Dragon Quest. Fans often clamored to see what Averill actually looked like, but the magazine continued to substitute photos of the toy, and even claimed that Alan was, in fact, a Blue Slime. Eventually, Averill retired from Nintendo Power, joining Nintendo of America's localization department. To this day, most fans have never seen a real image of Averill. The inclusion of a photo of Mr. T in the Player's Pulse section became a running gag in the early half of 2005. Late in the magazine's life, running gags centered on Chuck Norris references and jokes at the expense of writer Chris Shepperd.

During the early 1990s, the magazine started to give away a free copy of the NES game Dragon Warrior (Dragon Quest in Japan) to every new subscriber. The Dragon Quest series had been very popular in Japan, and Nintendo had hoped the localized North American release would also be a success and help promote the RPG genre. The game was a financial failure, however, leaving the company with a large number of unsold cartridges. The promotion both helped the company get rid of the unsold merchandise, and won the magazine thousands of new subscribers. During this time, Nintendo would also send VHS tapes to subscribers containing promotional videos for upcoming games.

Following the release of the Super NES, the magazine featured lengthy, continuous comic strips based on Super Mario World and The Legend of Zelda: A Link to the Past. After these stories ended, they were replaced by similar multi-issue stories based on Star Fox, Super Metroid, and later, Nintendo 64 games such as Star Wars: Shadows of the Empire and Blast Corps. It had several comics based on the animated series of Pokémon and Kirby: Right Back at Ya!. Toward the end, it included short excerpts based on Custom Robo and Metal Gear Solid: The Twin Snakes. It included a very short Metroid Prime comic, and another story based on the Pokémon Mystery Dungeon games translated from the original Japanese version.

== Official Guides from Nintendo Power ==
Nintendo Power produced a series of strategy magazines called Official Guides from Nintendo Power, beginning with The Official Nintendo Player's Guide. After Nintendo Power switched from a bi-monthly magazine to a monthly magazine in May 1990, some issues were positioned as strategy guides for single games replacing the guides. However, only four such issues were produced before Nintendo outsourced production of official guides to Prima Games.

== Nintendo Power Line ==
The Nintendo Power Line was a staffed hotline providing gameplay hints about Nintendo consoles, such as the Nintendo Entertainment System. It ran from the publishing of the first issue publication of Nintendo Power in 1988 until June 2010, closing in favor of the Internet. The hotline was revived as automated messages, from November 11 to November 13, 2016, in celebration of the release of the NES Classic Edition.

== Spin-off magazines ==
During 2001, Nintendo Power released a spin-off semi-magazine named Nintendo Power Advance, featuring the Game Boy Advance and its games. The first issue was complimentary for subscribers, and sold at newsstands. Four issues of Nintendo Power Advance were printed, the last of which is a strategy guide for Super Mario World: Super Mario Advance 2.

With the release of Pokémon for the Game Boy in 1998, Nintendo Power includes six mini-issues of Pokémon Power mainly featuring tips and strategies for the game.

In 1989, a smaller version of the magazine called Pocket Power was distributed at movie theaters showing The Wizard.

== Nester ==
Nester

Nester is the mascot of Nintendo Power. Nester was created by Howard Phillips, "President" of the Nintendo Fun Club and a former editor of Nintendo Power, to be the supporting character in his comic strip, Howard & Nester. The comic strips generally advertised new games, often by dream sequences where Nester was actually a given video game character. From 1989 to 1993, The Nintendo Power Awards featured Nester-shaped trophies and were referred to in the magazine as the "Nesters" in reference to the Oscars.

In the June 1991 issue (Volume 25), Phillips was written out of the strip after his real-life counterpart left Nintendo to work for LucasArts. The strip was retitled Nester's Adventures the following issue and continued publication until Volume 55 (December 1993). Nester, now as a college student, appeared in Nintendo Power issue #100. He is seen again in issue #231, the magazine's twentieth anniversary, here a grown man with a son new to Nintendo. Nester's final appearance in Nintendo Power is in the final issue, Volume 285, in a comic titled "Nester & Max", where he is seen reading and lamenting the final issue.

Nester is featured in a few video games that were released while the character was in the magazine. His first appearance was as a commentator in NES Play Action Football. Other appearances include the ending of To the Earth. Nester is the main character in Nester's Funky Bowling for the Virtual Boy, which also introduces his sister Hester. The character of Lark in Pilotwings 64 for the Nintendo 64 was based on Nester. Several NES games feature the name "NESTER" as one of the pre-set names on high-score lists, or a default character name such as in To the Earth. The original NES release of Dragon Warrior references both Howard and Nester through character dialog, however this was removed in the later Game Boy Color version. He is mentioned in one line of dialogue in the game StarTropics. A DLC microgame in WarioWare D.I.Y. created by Nintendo Power called Funky Boxing (a loose reference to Nester's Funky Bowling) does not have any apparent references to the character, but if the game is opened in the editor, the player's boxer is named "NESTER".

== Podcast ==
Nintendo Power
- Genre: Video games, entertainment, talk
- Language: English

Creative team
- Created by: Chris Slate
- Developed by: Chris Slate

Cast and voices
- Starring: Chris Slate

Publication
- No. of episodes: 57 (as of May 2023)
- Original release: December 20, 2017
- Provider: Nintendo

Related
- Website: http://www.nintendopower.com/

On December 20, 2017, Nintendo of America announced the official return of Nintendo Power as a podcast, hosted by former editor-in-chief of the original magazine, Chris Slate. In the first episode, Slate stated that the podcast was a "passion project" for Nintendo and that he wanted Nintendo Power to return. He also acknowledged that the format of that episode was experimental and that the frequency of the series' episodes had not been determined.

On May 12, 2023, an episode based on The Legend of Zelda: Tears of the Kingdom was released. In it, Chris Slate announced that the episode is the final planned one for the podcast. He followed up by stating that there may still be more special episodes later.

== See also ==
- Official Nintendo Magazine, the U.K. and Australian equivalent
- Nintendo Magazine System (Australia), the former Australian equivalent
- Nintendo Dream, the Japanese equivalent
- Club Nintendo, the Mexico and Latin America equivalent
- Nintendo World, the Brazil equivalent
- Nintendo Force, a fan-made spiritual successor
- Camp Hyrule, Nintendo's Internet-based community from 1995 to 2007, adjunct to Nintendo Power
- History of computer and video games
