= SD Gundam Dimension War =

1995 tactical role-playing video game

- Developer: Locomotive
- Publisher: Bandai
- Producer: Nobuyuki Tanaka
- Composers: Takashi Kumegawa; Akiko Hida
- Series: Gundam
- Platform: Virtual Boy
- Release: JP: December 22, 1995
- Genre: Tactical role-playing
- Mode: Single-player

SD Gundam Dimension War (Note: Japanese: SDガンダムディメンションウォー, Hepburn: Esu Dī Gandamu Dimenshon Wō) is a 1995 tactical role-playing video game published for the Virtual Boy in Japan by Bandai. Being the system's only licensed game in Japan, it is part of the SD Gundam series, a spin-off of the larger Gundam franchise by Sotsu and Sunrise. Players control a fleet of robots and vehicles as they set out to rid the galaxy of enemies, with gameplay involving moving robots towards opponents and engaging in combat sequences.

Developed by Locomotive Corporation, Dimension War was one of the two last Virtual Boy games released in Japan, produced following a final call from Nintendo before they ceased support for the system. It is one of few Gundam games not to have any involvement from Tose, who developed the majority of games in the series up to that point. Retrospectively, Dimension War received largely negative reviews for its structure, pacing, and combat scenarios, and is listed as being one of system's worst titles. It is one of the rarest and most sought-after Virtual Boy games, with original copies selling for over US$1000 in the second-hand market.

== Gameplay ==
The player maneuvering their fleet in the map

SD Gundam Dimension War is a tactical role-playing game based on the Gundam franchise. The gameplay involves players maneuvering their fleet of robots and ships around a grid-based map and destroying each of the enemies scattered about. The objective is to complete each of the game's eight levels without losing their fleet. Enemies are placed towards the top of the map, while players start at the bottom. Players are not required to destroy each enemy to progress to the next level, but they must at least destroy the enemy battle cruisers that are placed in specific spots on the map. The third level adds a heavily-armored boss that must be defeated to move onto the next level.

Players are able to attack enemies should one of their robots be near them. Two combat options can be chosen: indirect, which allows players to fire from a distance, and attack, which while more dangerous allows for stronger attacks. Choosing to attack enemies causes the game to shift to a combat scenario, where players are forced to attack the enemy either with a ranged laser cannon or through melee combat with a laser sword. Players and enemies are able to shift into the foreground and background, and must fight each other until one of them is destroyed. When fighting enemy cruisers, the game takes place within a third-person perspective, as players must fire enough shots at it to destroy the cruiser. An autopilot option is available where the AI performs the battle automatically, without any player input. There are three save slots available, allowing the player to save their progress and come back later.

== Development and release ==
SD Gundam Dimension War was developed by Locomotive Corporation and published by Bandai for the Virtual Boy, and the final game they developed for the system. The game is based on the SD Gundam series, a spin-off of the larger Gundam franchise by Sunrise and Sotsu. Most Gundam games have been developed by Tose, with Dimension War being one of few Gundam games not to have any involvement from them. The "SD" in the title is short for super-deformed, a Japanese art style that depicts characters with large heads on small bodies, similar to bobblehead figures. The title Dimension War is a nod to the game's usage of multiple perspectives during its combat sequences. Following a final call issued by Nintendo regarding Virtual Boy releases before they ceased support for the system, Bandai, alongside Athena, Taito, and J-Wing, rushed the game to market to hopefully recuperate costs. Dimension War was published on December 22, 1995, making it the last Virtual Boy game published in Japan. It was produced in limited quantities, most of which were purchased by Virtual Boy collectors and enthusiasts due to its title of being the country's final game for the console. Dimension War is one of the rarest and most sought-after Virtual Boy titles released, with the game selling for over US$1000 in the second-hand market.

== Reception ==
Reception

Review scores
Publication	Score
Famitsu	6/10, 3/10, 5/10, 5/10
Nintendo Life	4/10

The four reviewers at Famitsu found the game to be a mediocre tactical RPG that suffered from poor combat sequences and pacing, but liked its music for fitting in with the atmosphere. Jason Moore, a writer for the magazine Retrogames, was more positive in his review, writing that it was a nice diversion from the Virtual Boy's arcade-like format. He liked it for being much more "involving" of a title than other games for the system, but criticized its character animations for being poorly-made.

Retrospectively, SD Gundam Dimension War received largely negative reviews, with critics ranking it among the worst Virtual Boy games. Dave Frear of Nintendo Life described the game as being largely disappointing, especially for hardcore fans of the Gundam franchise. He took issue with its presentation, while also criticizing the game's combat scenarios; while he said they were fun at times, they needed a lot of polish and were largely repetitive. However, Frear felt that the music was done well, and that the game made good use of the system's 3D capabilities. Jeremy Parish claimed that Dimension War may have the worst action scenes on Virtual Boy, disliking the game's pacing, confusing controls, and combat sequences. Parish argued the only reason to get Dimension War was for collectors interested in getting a complete Virtual Boy library, further adding that the game added almost nothing new to the concept established in previous Gundam games for consoles such as the Game Boy. He concluded by claiming that it is better than Virtual Lab, a poorly-received falling-block puzzle game, which he noted was not difficult to be. The staff at Retro Gamer magazine similarly compared it to Virtual Lab in terms of quality, saying that its value was nowhere near the high price point it has online.
