= List of Virtual Boy games =

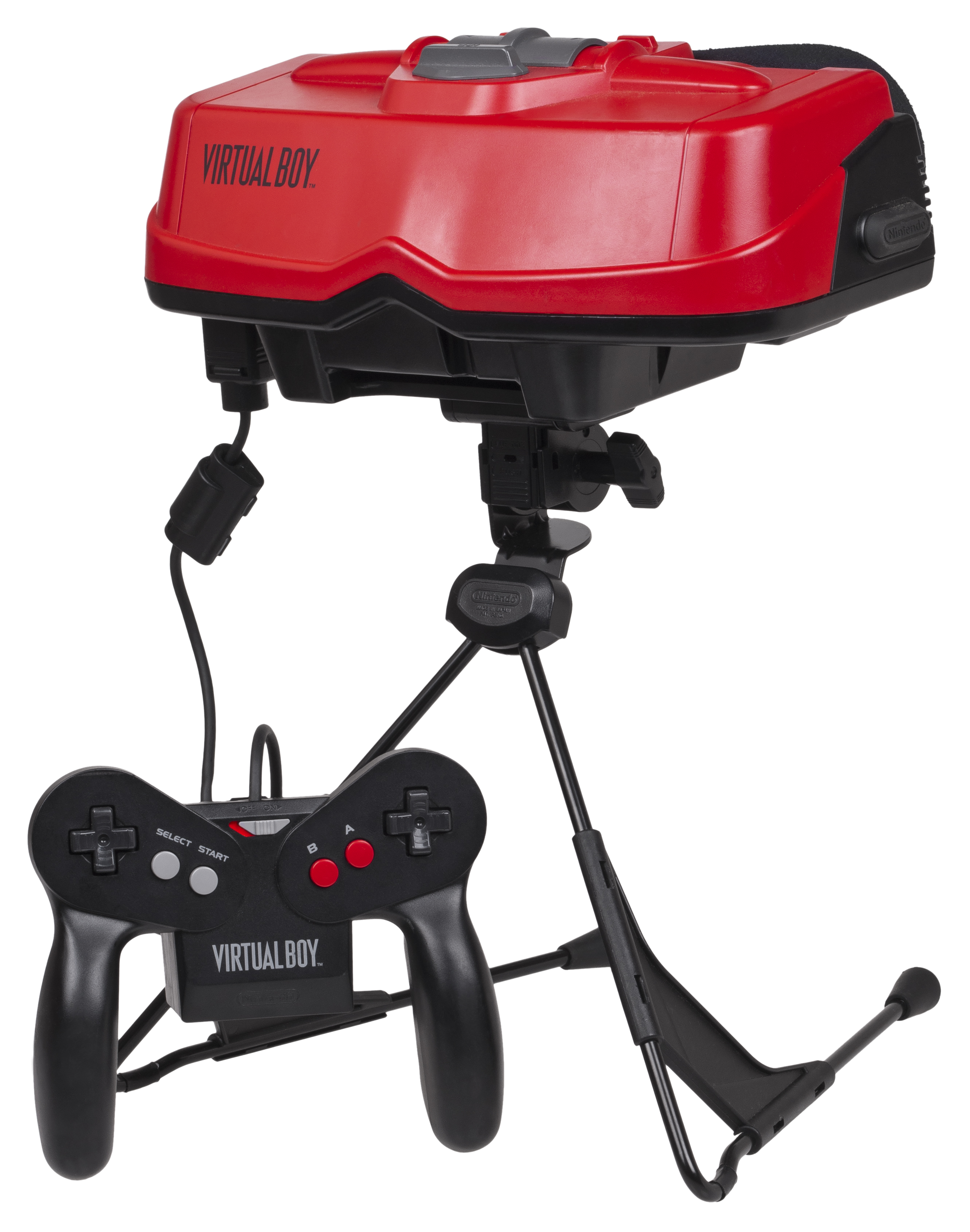
A Virtual Boy console with its controller

The Virtual Boy is a 32-bit tabletop video game console developed and designed by Nintendo, first released in Japan on July 21, 1995 and later in North America on August 14 of the same year. The following lists contains all of the games released for the Virtual Boy.

Originally unveiled at Nintendo's Shoshinkai Show in Japan on November 15, 1994 and at Winter CES in North America on January 6, 1995, it was never intended to be released in its final form but Nintendo pushed the Virtual Boy in its unfinished state to market so that it could focus development resources on the then-upcoming Nintendo 64 and arrived later than other 32-bit systems such as the 3DO Interactive Multiplayer, PlayStation, and Sega Saturn but at a lower price, retailing at US$179.95 but in mid-1996, Blockbuster was selling Virtual Boy units at $50 each.

The system was overwhelmingly panned by critics and was deemed a commercial failure, selling only 770,000 units before being discontinued both in Japan and North America on December 22, 1995 and March 2, 1996 respectively, making it the second lowest-selling hardware by Nintendo after the 64DD and its marketing campaign was commonly thought of as a failure. Several additional titles were announced to be released for the Virtual Boy at E3 1996, but ultimately they were never released due to the system’s discontinuation by Nintendo themselves, as were several localizations that were only released in one region.

This lists all games commercially released for the Virtual Boy. For games that were announced or in development but never released, see the list of cancelled Virtual Boy games.

== Games ==
Listed here are all 22 (Note: This number is always up to date by this script.) officially released Virtual Boy games. Of these, eight titles were exclusive to Japan, three to North America and the other 11 were released in both regions. The Americas saw 14 releases and Japan, Hong Kong, and other Asian territories had 19. A number of games were either announced or already in development before ultimately being cancelled, including Bound High! and NikoChan Battle. Two of these cancelled games, Dragon Hopper and Zero Racers, were officially released in 2026 via Nintendo Classics.

Title	Genre(s)	Developer(s)	Publisher(s)	Release date	
Title	Genre(s)	Developer(s)	Publisher(s)	Japan	North America
3D Tetris	Puzzle	T&E Soft	Nintendo	—N/a (Note: Canceled in development as Polygo Block)	March 22, 1996
Galactic Pinball	Pinball	Intelligent Systems	Nintendo	July 21, 1995	August 14, 1995
Golf	Sports	T&E Soft	T&E Soft (JP); Nintendo (NA)	August 11, 1995	November 1995
Innsmouth no Yakata (Note: Canceled in development as House of Insmouse, later translated in Nintendo Classics promos as The Mansion of Innsmouth)	First-person horror	Be Top	I'MAX	October 13, 1995	—N/a
Jack Bros.	Action	Atlus	Atlus	September 29, 1995	October 1995
Mario Clash	Action	Nintendo R&D1	Nintendo	September 28, 1995	October 1, 1995
Mario's Tennis	Sports	Nintendo R&D1; Tose	Nintendo	July 21, 1995	August 14, 1995
Nester's Funky Bowling	Sports	Saffire	Nintendo	—N/a	February 1996
Panic Bomber	Puzzle	Hudson Soft; Raizing	Hudson Soft (JP); Nintendo (NA)	July 21, 1995	December 1995
Red Alarm	Shoot 'em up	T&E Soft	T&E Soft (JP); Nintendo (NA)	July 21, 1995	August 14, 1995
SD Gundam Dimension War	Tactical role-playing game	Locomotive	Bandai	December 22, 1995	—N/a
Space Invaders Virtual Collection	Shoot 'em up	Taito	Taito	December 1, 1995	—N/a
Space Squash	Sports	Tomcat System	Coconuts Japan Entertainment	September 29, 1995	—N/a
Teleroboxer	Fighting	Nintendo R&D1	Nintendo	July 21, 1995	August 14, 1995
V-Tetris	Puzzle	Locomotive	Bullet-Proof Software	August 25, 1995	—N/a
Vertical Force	Shoot 'em up	Hudson Soft	Hudson Soft (JP); Nintendo (NA)	August 12, 1995	December 1, 1995
Virtual Bowling	Sports	Athena	Athena	December 22, 1995	—N/a
Virtual Boy Wario Land	Platform	Nintendo R&D1	Nintendo	December 1, 1995	November 27, 1995
Virtual Fishing	Fishing	Locomotive	Pack-In-Video	October 6, 1995	—N/a (Note: Canceled in development)
Virtual Lab	Puzzle	Nacoty	J-Wing	December 8, 1995	—N/a
Virtual League Baseball	Sports	Kemco	Kemco	August 11, 1995	September 11, 1995
Waterworld	Shoot 'em up	Ocean of America	Ocean of America	—N/a	December 21, 1995
