= Waterworld =

1995 post-apocalyptic action film

- Theatrical release poster
- Directed by: Kevin Reynolds
- Written by: Peter Rader; David Twohy
- Produced by: Kevin Costner; John Davis; Charles Gordon; Lawrence Gordon
- Starring: Kevin Costner; Dennis Hopper; Jeanne Tripplehorn; Tina Majorino; Michael Jeter
- Cinematography: Dean Semler
- Edited by: Peter Boyle
- Music by: James Newton Howard
- Production companies: Gordon Company; Davis Entertainment; Licht/Mueller Film Corporation
- Distributed by: Universal Pictures
- Release date: July 28, 1995
- Running time: 135 minutes
- Country: United States
- Language: English
- Budget: $172–175 million
- Box office: $264.2 million

Waterworld is a 1995 American post-apocalyptic action film, directed by Kevin Reynolds, and co-written by Peter Rader and David Twohy. It was based on Rader's original 1986 screenplay and stars Kevin Costner, who also produced it with Charles Gordon and John Davis, and distributed by Universal Pictures.

The setting of the film is in the distant future. The polar ice caps have completely melted, and the sea level has risen over 7,600 m (25,000 ft), covering nearly all of the land. The plot of the film centers on a nameless antihero, "The Mariner" (Costner), a drifter who sails the Earth in his trimaran.

The most expensive film ever made at the time, Waterworld was released to mixed reviews from critics, who praised the futuristic setting and premise but criticized the execution, including the characterization and acting performances. The film also was unable to recoup its massive budget at the box office despite being the ninth highest-grossing film of 1995. However, the film became profitable owing to video and other post-cinema sales. The film was nominated for an Academy Award in the category Best Sound at the 68th Academy Awards.

The film's release was accompanied by a novelization, video games, and a quartet of themed attractions at Universal Studios Hollywood, Universal Studios Singapore, Universal Studios Japan, and Universal Studios Beijing called WaterWorld.

== Plot ==
In 2500, rising sea levels have put every continent on Earth underwater. The remains of human civilization live on makeshift floating communities built out of scavenged materials known as atolls, having long forgotten about living on land. Rumors of a "Dryland" still exist, but are considered a myth by most.

The Mariner, a lone drifter, arrives at an atoll on his trimaran to trade dirt, a rare commodity, for supplies. When the locals see that the Mariner is a mutant, with gills and webbed feet, several accost him and he kills one in self-defense. As a result, the Mariner is sentenced to be drowned in a tank of organic sludge. While the Mariner is trapped there, the atoll is attacked by the Smokers, a formidable pirate gang that has been systematically raiding and destroying atolls.

Helen, a strong-willed atoll resident, tries to escape on a gas balloon dirigible with her young ward Enola and inventor Gregor. However, Gregor accidentally departs with only himself on board, stranding the two. She frees the Mariner on the condition that he takes them with him. The Mariner skillfully fights his way out, damaging the Smokers' forces and causing an explosion that blinds its leader, Deacon, in one eye. The Mariner, Helen, and Enola board the trimaran and escape. Following a brief skirmish with the Smoker's scout seaplane, the trio encounters a drifter suffering from cabin fever whom the Mariner kills after a trade gone awry, and a mutated shark the Mariner kills for food. Despite his initial reluctance and gruff attitude, the Mariner slowly warms up to his companions and has a bonding moment with Enola teaching her to swim.

After evading a trap set by the Smokers, the Mariner confronts Helen about their unusual persistence. She admits they are after Enola for the supposed directions to Dryland tattooed on Enola's back. Helen then demands to know where the Mariner collected his dirt. He takes her in a jury-rigged diving bell and shows her the underwater remains of Denver, Colorado, and the soil on the ocean's floor, crushing her belief in Dryland. When they surface, the pair find that the Smokers have caught up. They capture Enola and try to kill Helen and the Mariner before the two dive underwater. The Smokers set the trimaran on fire and leave.

Sorting through the wreckage of his boat, the Mariner sees a collection of National Geographic magazines and compares their images to Enola's doodles, realizing she was drawing Dryland objects. Gregor, having spotted the smoke from his dirigible, finds Helen and the Mariner and takes them to a new makeshift atoll. The Mariner takes a captured Smoker's jet ski to chase down the Smokers' base of operations, the remains of the Exxon Valdez, where they manufacture fuel, ammunition, and cigarettes.

Deacon's advisors struggle to decipher the tattoo. To keep his followers' minds off their dwindling resources, he bluffs that he has decoded the map and orders them back to their stations to row. The Mariner infiltrates the ship and confronts the Deacon, threatening to ignite the oil reserves in the hold unless Enola is returned. The Deacon calls the Mariner's bluff, knowing that it would destroy the ship, but to his shock, the Mariner drops a flare into the oil reservoir. The ship is engulfed in flames and begins to sink. The Mariner rescues Enola, escaping via a rope from Gregor's balloon with Helen and the Atoll Enforcer aboard. The Deacon fires on the balloon, shaking Enola into the ocean. As the Deacon and his men converge on her, the Mariner makes an impromptu bungee jump from the balloon to grab Enola before the Deacon and his men collide on their jet-skis, causing an explosion that kills them.

Gregor later identifies Enola's tattoo as coordinates with reversed directions. Following the map, the balloon party discovers Dryland, covered with vegetation and wildlife. They also find a hut with the remains of Enola's parents. The Mariner, feeling that he does not belong on Dryland, takes an old wooden catamaran from the island and departs, as Helen and Enola bid him farewell.

=== Ulysses Cut ===
The extended edition, dubbed the "Ulysses Cut", features scenes fleshing out the characters and settings. It identifies the Dryland as Mount Everest, and ends with Helen giving the Mariner the name Ulysses.

== Cast ==
- Kevin Costner as The Mariner
- Dennis Hopper as Deacon
- Jeanne Tripplehorn as Helen
- Tina Majorino as Enola
- Michael Jeter as Gregor
- Gerard Murphy as Nord
- R. D. Call as an Atoll enforcer
- Kim Coates as a drifter
- John Fleck as Smoker doctor
- Robert Joy as Smoker ledger guy
- Jack Black as a Smoker airplane pilot
- John Toles-Bey as a Smoker airplane gunner
- Zitto Kazann as an Atoll elder / survivor
- Zakes Mokae as Priam
- Sab Shimono as an Atoll elder

== Production ==
Writer Peter Rader came up with the idea for Waterworld during a conversation with Brad Krevoy where they discussed creating a Mad Max rip-off. Rader wrote the initial script in 1986 but kept it shelved until 1989. Rader cited Mad Max as a direct inspiration for the film, while also citing various Old Testament stories and the story of Helen of Troy (with the main female character being named Helen in a direct reference). It is also widely believed that inspiration was taken from Freakwave by Peter Milligan and Brendan McCarthy, a "Mad Max goes surfing" comic strip first published by Pacific Comics in Vanguard Illustrated #1–3 (November 1983 – March 1984), and continued by Eclipse Comics in Strange Days #1–3 (November 1984 – April 1985). McCarthy himself had tried to sell Freakwave as a movie in the early 1980s; he would go on to co-write Mad Max: Fury Road (2015).

After several rewrites, Kevin Costner and Kevin Reynolds joined the Waterworld production team in 1992. Universal Pictures preferred either Robert Zemeckis or Lawrence Kasdan to direct, but Costner chose Reynolds instead due to their friendship. The film marked the fourth collaboration between Costner and Reynolds, who had previously worked together on Fandango (1985), Robin Hood: Prince of Thieves (1991), and Rapa-Nui (1994), the latter of which Costner co-produced but did not star in. Waterworld was co-written by David Twohy, who cited Mad Max 2: The Road Warrior as a major inspiration. Both films employed Dean Semler as director of photography.

During production, the film was plagued by a series of cost overruns and production setbacks. Universal initially authorized a budget of $100 million, (Note: In an interview with Starlog, Costner stated that the original budget was approximately $135 million, but Universal, which was wary of greenlighting a film with a budget over $100 million, greenlit the film with a $65 million budget.) which by mid-1994 had swollen to $135 million, with final costs reaching an estimated $175 million, a record sum for a film production at the time. Filming took place in a large artificial seawater enclosure similar to that used in the film Titanic two years later; it was located in the Pacific Ocean off the west coast of Hawaii Island. The final scene was filmed in Waipiʻo Valley on Hawaii Island, also referred to as The Valley of Kings. Additional filming took place in Los Angeles, Huntington Beach, and Santa Catalina Island in California. Before filming began, Steven Spielberg had warned Costner and Reynolds not to film on open water owing to his own production difficulties with Jaws. The production was hampered by difficulties in obtaining otherwise simple shots due to poor weather, safety concerns, and the camera crew being pushed out of position by waves. One of the floating sets sank in heavy seas, and had to be repaired. (Note: Contrary to rumors, this was not the multimillion dollar atoll set, but rather the smaller slave colony one, and the event occurred after the bulk of shooting had already finished.) Eventually the production had to be extended by nearly three months, from 96 days to over 150. The state of Hawaii had more than $35 million added to its economy as a result of the colossal film production.

The production featured different types of personal watercraft, especially Kawasaki jet skis. Kevin Costner was on the set for 157 days, working six days a week. At one point, he nearly died when he got caught in a squall while tied to the mast of his trimaran. Professional surfer Laird Hamilton was Kevin Costner's stunt double for many water scenes. Hamilton commuted to the set via jet ski.

Mark Isham's score, which was not recorded for approximately 25 percent of the film and had only demos completed, was reportedly rejected by Costner because it was "too ethnic and bleak", contrasting with the film's futuristic and adventurous tone; Isham offered to try again but was not given the chance. James Newton Howard was brought in to write the new score. Joss Whedon flew out to the set to do last minute script rewrites and later described it as "seven weeks of hell"; the work boiled down to editing in Costner's ideas without alteration.

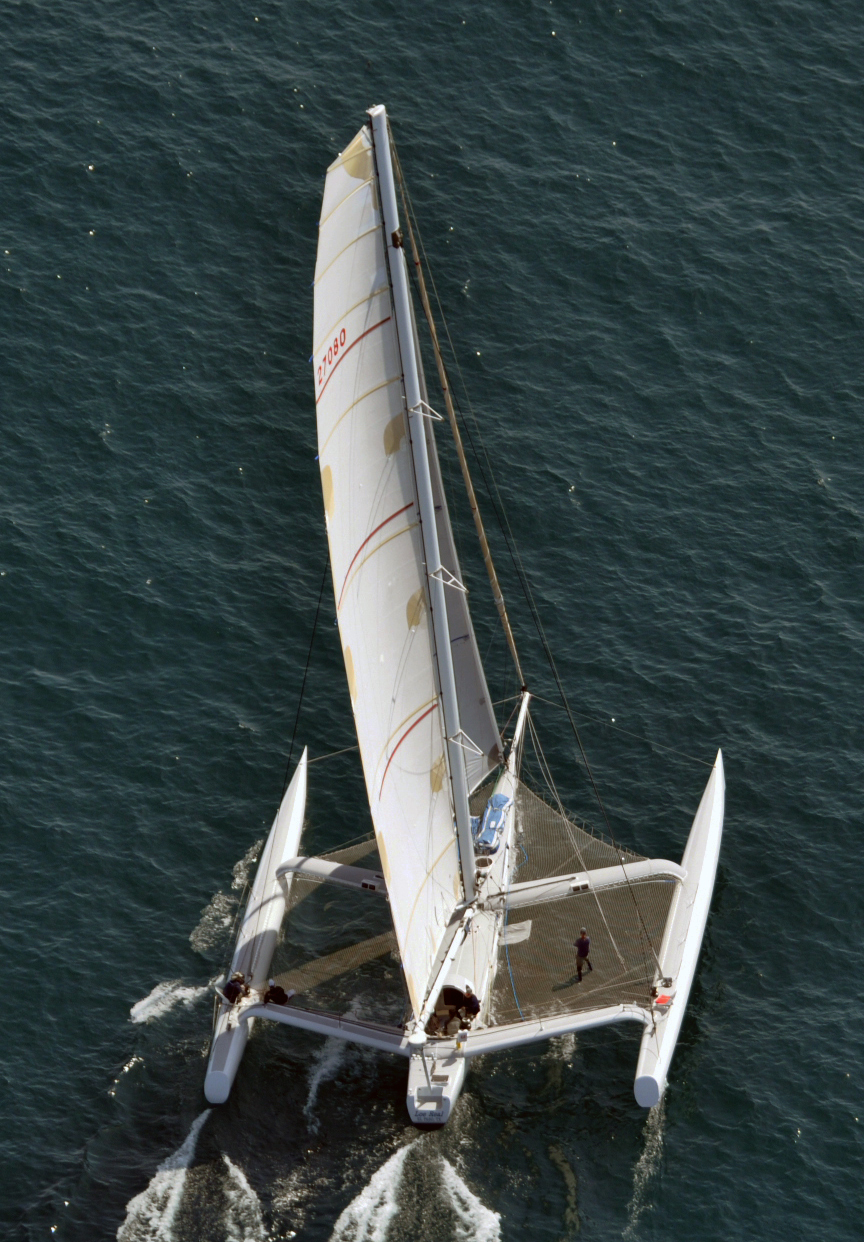
Loe Real, one of the two 60 ft (18 m) Waterworld trimarans in 2013; Newport Beach, California

Inspired by racing trimarans built by Jeanneau Advanced Technologies' multi-hull division, Lagoon, a custom 60 foot (18 m) yacht was designed by Marc Van Peteghem and Vincent Lauriot-Prevost and built in France by Lagoon. Two versions were built, a relatively standard racing trimaran for distance shots, and an effects-laden transforming trimaran for closeup shots. The first trimaran was launched on 2 April 1994, and surpassed 30 knots (56 km/h; 35 mph) in September of that year. The transforming version was initially a raft with a three-bladed egg-beater windmill. When certain levers were triggered, the windmill blades flattened, and a hidden mast is raised to full racing height. A boom previously hidden in the hull emerged, and two sails were automatically unfurled. Once the transformation was complete, this version could actually sail, though not as well as the dedicated racer. The transforming version is in private hands in San Diego, California. For many years, the racing version was kept on a lake at Universal Studios Florida, before being restored for use as a racing trimaran named Loe Real, which was, as of 2012, being offered for sale in San Diego.

Kevin Reynolds quit the film before its release, owing to heated battles with Costner over his creative decisions. Reynolds still received full credit as director. Despite their reported clashes, the director and star reunited almost two decades later for the History Channel miniseries Hatfields & McCoys.

== Release ==
=== Home media ===
Waterworld was released on VHS and LaserDisc on January 23, 1996. On September 9, 1997, it debuted on a THX certified widescreen VHS release. The film was then released on DVD on December 9, 1997, on Blu-ray on October 20, 2009, and on 4K Blu-ray on July 9, 2019.

== Reception ==
=== Box office ===
Waterworld's reported budget was $172 million, and a total outlay of $235 million once marketing and distribution costs are factored in. Because of the runaway costs of the production, some critics dubbed it "Fishtar" and "Kevin's Gate", alluding to the flops Ishtar and Heaven's Gate.

The film debuted at the box office at No. 1. For its first weekend, Waterworld collected a total of $21.6 million. At the end of its run, the film grossed $88 million at the North American box office, and $176 million overseas, for a worldwide total of $264 million.

Taking into account the percentage of box office gross that theaters retain, which is generally up to half, Waterworld is considered a box office disappointment. After factoring in home video sales and TV broadcast rights among other revenue streams, it eventually became profitable.

=== Critical response ===
Contemporary reviews for the film were mixed. Roger Ebert gave Waterworld 2.5 stars out of 4 and said: "The cost controversy aside, Waterworld is a decent futuristic action picture with some great sets, some intriguing ideas, and a few images that will stay with me. It could have been more, it could have been better, and it could have made me care about the characters. It's one of those marginal pictures you're not unhappy to have seen, but can't quite recommend." Owen Gleiberman gave it a B in Entertainment Weekly. He commented that while its massive budget had paid off by genuinely creating the sensation of a world built on water, the film generally came off as a second-rate rip-off of The Road Warrior (Mad Max 2), with weaker, slower-paced action sequences and less startling villains. He praised Costner's performance, but found the film's environmental message pretentious. James Berardinelli of Reelviews Movie Reviews was one of the film's few supporters, calling it "one of Hollywood's most lavish features to date". He wrote: "Although the storyline isn't all that invigorating, the action is, and that's what saves Waterworld. In the tradition of the old Westerns and Mel Gibson's Mad Max flicks, this film provides good escapist fun. Everyone behind the scenes did their part with aplomb, and the result is a feast for the eyes and ears." Mick LaSalle, reviewing the film the week of its release on home video, argued that it did not deserve some of its more negative reviews, since "despite its confused impulses and occasional slow spots, Waterworld... has an elusive, appealing spirit that holds up for more than two hours. It's a genuine vault at greatness that misses the mark – but survives." He commented that while the film succeeds at its high ambitions for isolated moments, the clash between its earnest ambition and intrusive flashiness makes it generally fall short of its reach.

On Rotten Tomatoes, the film holds an approval rating of 61% based on 137 reviews, with an average rating of 6/10. The site's critics consensus reads: "Though it suffered from toxic buzz at the time of its release, Waterworld is ultimately an ambitious misfire: an extravagant sci-fi flick with some decent moments and a lot of silly ones." Metacritic assigned the film a weighted average score of 56 out of 100, based on 17 critics, indicating "mixed or average reviews". Audiences polled by CinemaScore gave the film an average grade of "B" on an A+ to F scale.

In a 2020 retrospective, Ben Child of The Guardian described it as "a perfectly watchable sci-fi cult classic" that deserves reappraisal. He acknowledged that much of the plot was illogical and absurd and some of the action set-pieces "preposterously ambitious", but argued that both of them offer excitement and B-movie charm.

=== Cast and director's reception ===
Kevin Costner said he's very fond of the film: "It stands up as a really exotic, cool movie. I mean, it was flawed — for sure. But, overall, it's a very inventive, cool movie. It's pretty robust." Dennis Hopper also enjoyed it, saying "I thought Waterworld got a bad name for itself in the United States, but it did really well in Europe and Asia. I think the studio sort of shot themselves in the foot by announcing it was so over budget, blah blah blah, it's going to be a failure... All this came out before we released it in the States. But I enjoyed it." In retrospect, Director Kevin Reynolds said: "My own personal take on the picture is that I don't think it's any better, any worse than most summer blockbusters, it's somewhere in the middle. I think yeah, it's certainly got its faults, but I think, you know, on another level I think it works quite well compared to some of the other big films. But by the end, people…they wanted it to be a disaster."

=== Accolades ===
Accolades for Waterworld
Award	Subject	Nominee	Result
Academy Awards	Best Sound	Steve Maslow, Gregg Landaker and Keith A. Wester	Nominated
British Academy Film Awards	Best Special Visual Effects	Michael J. McAlister, Brad Kuehn, Robert Spurlock and Martin Bresin	Nominated
Golden Raspberry Awards	Worst Picture	Charles Gordon, John Davis, and Kevin Costner	Nominated
Golden Raspberry Awards	Worst Director	Kevin Reynolds	Nominated
Golden Raspberry Awards	Worst Actor	Kevin Costner	Nominated
Golden Raspberry Awards	Worst Supporting Actor	Dennis Hopper	Won
Saturn Awards	Best Science Fiction Film		Nominated
Saturn Awards	Best Costume	John Bloomfield	Nominated
Saturn Awards	Best DVD or Blu-ray Special Edition Release		Won

== Other media ==
=== Novelization ===
A novelization was written by Max Allan Collins and published by Arrow Books. It goes into greater detail regarding the world of the film.

=== Comic books ===
A sequel comic book four-issue mini-series entitled Waterworld: Children of Leviathan, drawn by Kevin Kobasic, was released by Acclaim Comics in 1997. Kevin Costner did not permit his likeness to be used for the comics, so the Mariner looks different. The story reveals some of the Mariner's back-story as he gathers clues about where he came from and why he is different. The comic expands on the possible cause of the melting of the polar ice caps and worldwide flood, and introduces a new villain, "Leviathan", who supplied the Deacon's Smoker organization. The comic hints at the possibility that the Mariner's mutation may not be caused by evolution but by genetic engineering and that his origins may be linked to those of the "Sea Eater", the sea monster seen during the fishing scene in the film.

=== Video games ===
Video games based on the film were released for the Super NES, Game Boy, Virtual Boy, and PC. A Genesis version was only released on the Sega Channel. A Sega Saturn version of the game was also planned, and development was completed, but it was cancelled prior to release. The Super NES and Game Boy releases were only available in the United Kingdom and Australia. While the Super NES and Virtual Boy versions were released by Ocean Software, the PC version was released by Interplay. The Virtual Boy version of the game was the only movie licensed game for the system. Minigames based on the stage show appear in Universal Studios Theme Parks Adventure for GameCube and Welcome to Universal Studios Japan for PlayStation 2.

In the 1997 episode of The Simpsons, "The Springfield Files", Milhouse Van Houten is seen playing a fictional video game called Kevin Costner's Waterworld. After depositing 40 quarters (US$10), the character takes two steps before a game over screen appears and a voice (implied to be Costner) says "Game over, please deposit forty quarters." In 2022, a developer using the handle "Macaw45" made a full-length video game adaptation of the fictional game, which involves the player fighting characters such as the Nord and Deacon, and inserting 40 quarters into the arcade machine each time the player dies.

=== Pinball ===
The film was released as a pinball machine in 1995 by Gottlieb Amusements (later Premier, both now defunct).

=== Theme park attraction ===
There are attractions at Universal Studios Hollywood, Universal Studios Japan, Universal Studios Singapore, and Universal Studios Beijing based on the film. The show's plot takes place after the film, as Helen returns to the Atoll with proof of Dryland, only to find herself followed by the Deacon, who survived the events of the film. The Mariner arrives after him, defeats the Deacon and takes Helen back to Dryland. When Universal Studios Japan first began hosting a seasonal One Piece themed show on its Waterworld stage in 2007, it took the form of a full crossover with Deacon teaming up with Buggy the Clown to battle the Straw Hat Pirates.

=== Television series ===
In July 2021, it was announced Universal Content Productions was in early development on a follow-up TV series to be directed by Dan Trachtenberg. In June 2025, Trachtenberg stated that the previous announcement was "premature" and no work had actually been done on the series.

== See also ==
- List of underwater science fiction works
- Future Boy Conan
- The Drowned World
