= Galactic Pinball =

1995 video game

- North American box art
- Developer: Intelligent Systems
- Publisher: Nintendo
- Director: Kenji Yamamoto
- Composers: Kenji Yamamoto; Masaru Tajima
- Platform: Virtual Boy
- Release: JP: July 21, 1995; NA: August 14, 1995
- Genre: Pinball
- Mode: Single-player

Galactic Pinball (Note: Japanese: ギャラクティック・ピンボール, Hepburn: Gyarakutikku Pinbōru) is a 1995 pinball video game developed by Intelligent Systems and published by Nintendo for the Virtual Boy. The game was released on July 21, 1995 in Japan and on August 14, 1995 in the United States. It is one of five launch games for the Virtual Boy, along with Mario's Tennis, Red Alarm, Teleroboxer, and Panic Bomber (the former three were also the launch games for the console in North America). In the game, which is set in the Milky Way galaxy, players maneuver a puck around one of four pinball tables available in the game. The Virtual Boy's standard red-and-black color scheme resulted in criticism of this and other games on the platform for causing nausea, headaches, and eye strain. It uses parallax, which allows the game to display three-dimensional effects. It has received a mixed reception; it was praised for its authenticity, while reception to its physics and controls were mixed. It has received criticism for its lack of ambition and originality.

== Gameplay and premise ==
Gameplay image of Galactic Pinball. The game is designed with red and black visuals.

Galactic Pinball is set in the Milky Way galaxy, and tells the story of the discovery of a new, strange world. At the title screen, players can choose from four pinball tables: Cosmic, Colony, UFO, and Alien. Players can choose to look at the top scores. The Cosmic table features a cameo from Metroid where players control protagonist Samus Aran's ship. Players are given five pucks, which players must keep going by using the flippers to hit it upward. The goal is to accumulate points and avoid allowing the puck to drop to the bottom of the table. The game begins with players shooting a puck into the table by holding the A button to launch it with a plunger. The longer the button is held, the harder the puck is launched. Players can also push a button to shake the in-game table, though if it is used too often, the flippers will be disabled and the puck will fall. There are various bonuses that players can experience during play. Some tables allow players to activate a "Bonus Roulette wheel", and some will allow them to get bonus points by collecting letters that spell the table's name. Bonus points will be awarded when a puck drops out of play, which varies depending on how long a puck was in play. Each table features a bonus puck to find. Players can collect stars, and upon collecting enough of them, they will be able to choose to go to a Bonus Stage or collect bonus points instead.

== Development and release ==
The development of Galactic Pinball was managed by Gunpei Yokoi, who created the Virtual Boy. It was directed by Kenji Yamamoto, who composed the sound alongside Masaru Tajima. It was shown during the Virtual Boy's debut alongside Teleroboxer. It has been called at varying points as Space Pinball, Virtual Pinball, and Pinball VB. It was one of the launch games for the Virtual Boy, and was released on July 21, 1995 in Japan and on August 14, 1995 in the United States. Like all Virtual Boy games, Galactic Pinball uses a red-and-black color scheme and parallax visuals to simulate three-dimensional depth.

Galactic Pinball was added to the Nintendo Classics service on February 17, 2026. On July 31, 2026, the game's soundtrack was added to Nintendo Music.

== Reception ==
Reception

Review score
Publication	Score
Famitsu	6/10, 4/10, 6/10, 8/10

Galactic Pinball has received a mixed reception. Before its release, GamePro speculated that it might be "one of the best pinball games around." GamePro reviewer Slo Mo praised the diversity of tables, responsive controls, and innovative 3D stage design. Writer Jeremy Parish called it a quality pinball game for its time and felt that it would have been a better pack-in title than Mario's Tennis. An editor for IGN called it one of the best Virtual Boy games for its pinball gameplay and visual design. Retro Gamer's Nick Thorpe felt that it was less popular than other Virtual Boy games, but deserved to be played. Outlets including Videogames and Retro Gamer praised it for its authenticity as a pinball game. Specific praises include its physics and sound design. A retrospective feature by Australian video game talk show Good Game praised its authenticity, but felt that it lacked ambition. VentureBeat writer Jeff Grubb was more negative on Galactic Pinball, calling it a bad Virtual Boy game due to being low effort as a pinball game. Galactic Pinball was reviewed by two GameFan editors, both of whom were not enthused with it. The first reviewer found it forgettable for people not interested in pinball games, while the other suggested avoiding it. Allgame disliked Galactic Pinball, feeling that the slow pace and unrealistic physics hurt it as a pinball experience.

Outlets such as Electronic Entertainment and Nintendo Power praised the 3D design, the latter voting it the fourth best Virtual Boy game of 1995 due in part to the limited use of 3D. A reviewer for Nintendo Power however criticized the limited 3D as well as a lack of a battery save for high scores. PC Magazine's Benj Edwards included it among his list of seven "forgotten Nintendo Virtual Boy classics." He cites Yokoi's interest in the Virtual Boy's black space as a way to convey "infinite space behind the playfield," and speculates that this was the origin of Galactic Pinball. A writer for Electronic Gaming Monthly found the level design excellent but that the flippers were too slow to respond. Kill Screen writer Jon Irwin similarly criticized its physics, stating that slowdown occurred whenever the puck approached the flippers. He felt that the action and physics were better in the Space Pinball demo than the final release. Next Generation was critical of Galactic Pinball due to poor lasting value. Tim Stevens for Engadget criticized the sound effects, in particular the lack of sound for the puck. He speculated that it was due to the digital voice work taking up too much room on the cartridge.

== See also ==
- List of Virtual Boy games
