= Virtual Labs =

Virtual Labs may refer to:

- Virtual Labs (India), a project of India's Ministry of Human Resource Development
- Remote laboratory
- Virtual Lab, a Japanese puzzle game
