= Dragon Hopper =

2026 platform-adventure video game completed in 1996

- Preliminary North American cover by Mike Takagi
- Developer: Intelligent Systems
- Publisher: Nintendo
- Director: Ryota Kawade
- Designer: Ryota Kawade
- Programmers: Mitsuru Matsumoto; Kaoru Kita
- Composer: Minako Hamano
- Platform: Virtual Boy (Note: Dragon Hopper was developed for the Virtual Boy. The game never received a physical release, but was released via the Nintendo Classics service for the Nintendo Switch and Nintendo Switch 2.)
- Release: WW: 4 August 2026
- Genre: Platform-adventure
- Mode: Single-player

Dragon Hopper (Note: Japanese: ドラゴンホッパー, Hepburn: Doragon Hoppā; also known as D-Hopper) is a platform-adventure video game developed by Intelligent Systems for the Virtual Boy. It stars Dorin, a dragon prince from the Celestia kingdom, on a journey to free his loved ones imprisoned by Lexer, a corrupt prime minister. During the journey, Dorin seeks help from four spirits to transform into elemental dragons. The player controls Dorin, accompanied by the fairy Seline, through several stages consisting of stepped floors, terraces and platforms, with multiple levels of depth.

Dragon Hopper was directed and designed by Ryota Kawade, who previously worked on Galactic Pinball and would later work on the Paper Mario series. The music was composed by Minako Hamano, who also worked on Galactic Pinball. Originally planned for a 1996 release by publisher Nintendo, the game was intended to be one of the flagship titles for a relaunch of the Virtual Boy, but it was canceled following the commercial failure of the platform. Nintendo eventually released it in 2026 through the Nintendo Classics service.

Dragon Hopper received a generally favorable reception from video game publications before its cancellation in 1996 and after its release in 2026, with praise for the graphical presentation and vertical gameplay that took advantage of the Virtual Boy's 3D capabilities, while criticism was directed at the short length and simple combat system.

== Gameplay ==
Dorin, accompanied by the fairy Seline, jumping to a higher platform in the Great Tunnel, the second stage of Dragon Hopper, where an enemy lies on the lower floor

Dragon Hopper is a platform-adventure game played from a top-down perspective, reminiscent of The Legend of Zelda. The story follows Dorin, a dragon prince who lives in the kingdom of Celestia with his family, the king and queen, and his girlfriend Diana. One day, Lexer, a corrupt prime minister, stages a sudden coup against Celestia and imprisons Dorin's family. Lexer sends his henchmen after Dorin, who falls into a hole that leads him to Faeron, an underground land ruled by fairies. A group of fairies takes Dorin before queen Lily, ruler of Faeron, who tells him of four elemental spirits who could help him, but who have vanished. Dorin embarks on a journey to find the spirits, return home, and free his loved ones. (Note: Attributed to multiple references:)

The player controls Dorin through seven stages, each divided into several areas. Every stage consists of stepped floors, terraces, and platforms, with multiple levels of depth. Dorin can jump to reach higher platforms or descend to lower floors. With each jump, the ground beneath Dorin gradually fades away, while higher platforms become visible. If Dorin is below a higher platform, the floor above becomes transparent. Dorin can also fly by flapping his wings and slow his descent by flapping them several times before landing. The player explores the stages collecting star medals and other items, interacting with non-player characters to learn the whereabouts of the four spirits, and fighting enemies. Dorin can perform a headbutt, lunge at enemies, or attack them from above. The player must also find keys in hidden rooms to advance and a star that will transport Dorin to the next area. In almost every stage, Dorin must face a boss.

After completing the first stage, Dorin will be accompanied by the fairy Seline, who can cast magic spells. At each stage, there are portals to a magic shop, where players can spend star coins on new spells or access a bonus room to obtain more coins. To use Seline's magic, the player must find magic fragments scattered around the stage or dropped by defeated enemies. There are also portals that take Dorin to a room where one of the four spirits is imprisoned. By freeing the spirits, Dorin will receive the power to transform into an elemental dragon that wield special abilities in order to progress. Dorin is immune to fall damage, though some obstacles will hurt him if he falls on them. Dorin can also be harmed if he does not land on solid ground or if he is hit by enemies, but the player can collect heart pieces to restore his health bar. The game is over once Dorin's health bar has depleted completely, but the player is given the option to continue. The game includes an internal battery for saving data.

== Development and release ==
Dragon Hopper was developed by Intelligent Systems, which had previously worked on Galactic Pinball for the Virtual Boy. It was directed and designed by Ryota Kawade, who worked on Galactic Pinball as an assistant designer. During his student years, Kawade researched machine tools used in factories, but decided he wanted a creative job and entered the video game industry. Initially, he wanted to be a game planner, but as Intelligent Systems was only hiring designers and programmers at the time, he decided to join as a designer in 1994, working on SNES titles such as Wario's Woods and Panel de Pon. Mitsuru Matsumoto, who previously worked on Super Metroid, served as one of the game's co-programmers alongside Kaoru Kita. The music was composed by Minako Hamano, who also worked on Galactic Pinball, as well as Super Metroid and The Legend of Zelda: Link's Awakening.

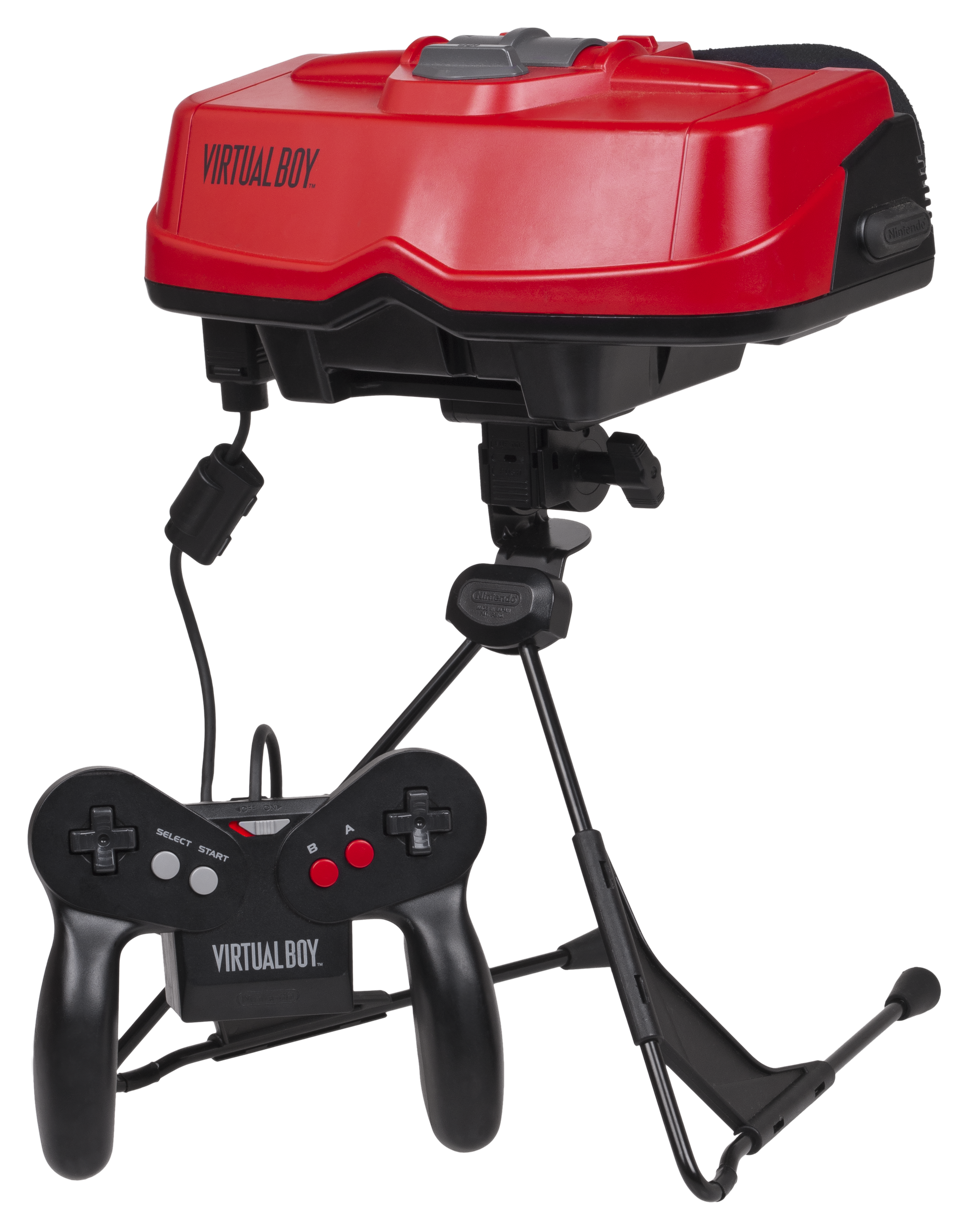
Dragon Hopper was announced in 1995, but was not released due to the Virtual Boy's poor critical and commercial reception until 2026 via the Nintendo Classics service

Details about Dragon Hopper were revealed at Shoshinkai 1995, followed by a preview article in the April 1996 issue of Nintendo Power. The game was showcased alongside Bound High! at E3 1996, being the only two Virtual Boy titles present at the event. Dragon Hopper was intended to be one of the flagship titles for a relaunch of the Virtual Boy, and its release was scheduled for 26 August 1996, in both Japan and North America. However, it was never released due to Nintendo discontinuing the Virtual Boy for being a commercial failure. Kawade would later go on to work on the Paper Mario series. For years no prototypes containing a ROM image of the game were found, and the remaining evidence of its existence consisted of gameplay footage, screenshots from various video game magazines, a North American preliminary cover illustrated by artist Mike Takagi, and an ESRB rating.

In 2026, 30 years after its original intended release window, Nintendo announced that Dragon Hopper would be officially released for the first time on the Nintendo Classics service. Due to trademark conflicts, it was referred to under the name "D-Hopper" in English marketing materials, though the game itself retains its original title. Dragon Hopper was released on 4 August 2026, alongside another previously unreleased Virtual Boy game, Zero Racers.

== Reception ==
Dragon Hopper received generally favorable commentary from gaming publications prior to its cancellation. Nintendo Power stated that the game had a genuine 3D feel not only in the graphics, but also in the gameplay. Total!'s Rob Pegley said the game could be a great addition to the Virtual Boy catalog. Club Nintendo considered it an excellent adventure game. They opined that the vertical movement took good advantage of the Virtual Boy's capabilities and made it more visually appealing. In contrast to the other publications, Julian Eggebrecht, writing for the German edition of Total!, felt that "Dragon Hopper is little more than a feeble attempt to evoke memories of Zelda". Likewise, British magazine Retrogames doubted that "a top down arcade adventure like Dragon Hopper would have created more Virtual Boy devotees".

After its release, Nintendo Life's Nile Bowie praised Dragon Hopper for its presentation and gameplay structure, noting that the stereoscopic 3D effect made jumping and traversal more intuitive, but criticized the combat for being too simple. Nintendo Life later ranked it as the second best Virtual Boy game on Nintendo Switch Online. Guillaume Verdin of the French website MO5.com opined that the game took advantage of the Virtual Boy's 3D effect with its vertical gameplay, citing similarities to Bound High! and Jumping Flash!, but noted its short duration and unsophisticated combat.
