= Nintendo Music =

Music streaming service

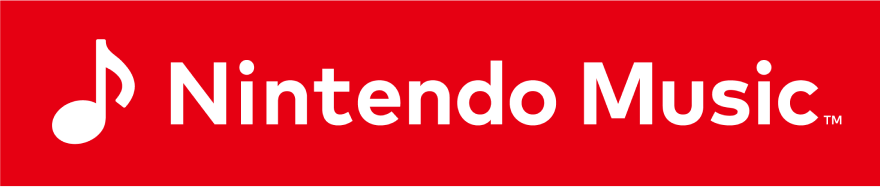

- Nintendo Music's home menu in December 2025
- Developer: Nintendo
- Type: Music streaming service
- Launched: October 31, 2024; 2 years ago
- Platforms: Android; iOS; iPadOS; Web
- Status: Active
- Availability: 50 regions

Nintendo Music is a music streaming service by Nintendo that features their video game soundtracks. The service is available for Nintendo Switch Online users, a subscription service otherwise for the Nintendo Switch and Nintendo Switch 2 video game consoles. Nintendo Music launched for Android and iOS on October 31, 2024, with a web player added on June 1, 2026. In addition to music streaming, features for extended music playback and spoiler prevention are available to users. Themed playlists appear based on Nintendo franchises, characters, and general moods, with video game screenshots representing each track. It is the first widely accessible digital platform for Nintendo's soundtracks, with previous video games receiving soundtrack CDs exclusively in Japan or through limited edition game releases.

Nintendo Music has received mixed reviews. Praise was given for its curated playlists, extendable tracks, and the ever-expanding library of soundtracks since launch. Fans and journalists have criticized the app for its exclusion of composer credits, the lack of available songs during its initial launch, and limited music offerings in "special release" playlists. As of November 2024, the app has been downloaded by over one million users.

== Features ==
Nintendo Music allows users to add tracks to both curated and custom playlists. Each game soundtrack is organized into two albums: "Top tracks", which lists significant tracks from their respective software, and "all tracks", containing every song in the album. Each song on the service has a corresponding screenshot or image to represent when it plays in its respective software. The service also allows for extending the playback of some tracks to 15, 30, or 60 minutes. The service provides three types of audio quality: data saving, balanced, and high quality. It also includes a feature that allows users to hide tracks and albums to avoid spoilers. Playlists for Nintendo characters, franchises, and game-specific playlists are included on the app, along with other curated playlists such as ones for different moods. Additionally, under the search menu, Nintendo Music displays the user's played game history from their Nintendo systems if the games are included on the app.

On May 30, 2025, an update was issued adding support for a sleep timer and extending tracks for only 5 or 10 minutes. On August 4, 2025, some features were made available to members with expired Nintendo Switch Online subscriptions, and app stability when playing tracks from large playlists was improved. On October 31, 2025, an update added the ability for playlists containing hourly songs from the Animal Crossing series to be played at the current time of day. On December 11, 2025, the "Year in Review" feature was added, allowing users to view their most frequently played tracks and statistics from the year. On June 1, 2026, support for iPadOS, Apple CarPlay and Android Auto was added, alongside a web player.

== Background and release ==
Prior to development on Nintendo Music, Nintendo primarily released its soundtracks as CDs in Japan due to the Japanese market favoring physical media. Outside of Japan, video game soundtracks were either distributed through Club Nintendo, a loyalty rewards program that closed operation in 2015, or through special edition releases of games such as The Legend of Zelda: Skyward Sword (2011) and Kirby's Dream Collection (2012). Other games allow players to listen to their soundtracks in a dedicated menu, with some games such as Super Smash Bros. Ultimate advertising the Nintendo Switch system as a music player. Nintendo soundtracks have rarely been listed on music streaming services before the launch of Nintendo Music, with some exceptions being tracks from Kirby and Pokémon, two series co-owned by Nintendo, and a selection from Super Mario Odyssey (2017). In addition, channels on YouTube that hosted Nintendo music have received copyright strike takedown requests from Nintendo, with there being little to no official ways to listen to Nintendo's music on other platforms. This led to continued issues with the accessibility of Nintendo's music outside of Japan, causing increased online piracy.

Nintendo Music is available in 50 regions as of November 2026.

Nintendo Music was announced and launched on October 31, 2024. The service was released for Android and iOS devices, initially covering 45 markets; it became available in Taiwan on September 9, 2025, in Singapore, Malaysia, and Thailand on November 18, 2025, and in the Philippines on November 10, 2026. The service is available for all Nintendo Switch Online users, a subscription service for the Nintendo Switch and Nintendo Switch 2 video game consoles. It launched shortly after the release of Alarmo in October 2024, an alarm clock that similarly plays music from select Nintendo video games. A representative from Nintendo claimed the decision to create the app stemmed from expanding access to Nintendo IP, allowing users to receive video game music and enjoy them in a manner unique to Nintendo. Additionally, they wanted the ability to inspire people to play their games by having an increased access to their music library. It is the third non-gaming Nintendo mobile application to release worldwide after the Nintendo Switch Parental Controls app and Nintendo Switch App.

== List of soundtracks ==
Twenty-three soundtracks from various games and consoles were made available at launch, with new soundtracks usually added weekly. Occasionally, after the release of large soundtracks, no new tracks will be added the following week. "Special release" tracks have also been added, containing a select few songs from upcoming or recently released Nintendo Switch and Nintendo Switch 2 games. While many game soundtracks released are added in no particular order, some soundtracks are released to coincide with anniversaries, as was the case with Splatoon's 10th anniversary and Animal Crossing's 25th anniversary; or with upcoming game announcements, such as the soundtrack for Wii Sports Resort being added the same week Nintendo Switch Sports Resort was announced. Other soundtracks and their corresponding games have launched simultaneously on Nintendo Music and Nintendo Classics, another Nintendo Switch Online service that offers classic Nintendo video games. There are 148 soundtracks available as of November 12, 2026.

List of soundtracks on Nintendo Music
| Soundtrack | Added | Ref. |
|---|---|---|
| Animal Crossing | April 14, 2026 | |
| Animal Crossing: New Horizons | October 31, 2024 (Note: Additional tracks from the 3.0 update were added on March 31, 2026, whilst tracks from the Happy Home Paradise DLC were added on June 25, 2026) | |
| Animal Crossing: New Leaf (Note: Excludes tracks from the Welcome amiibo update) | November 4, 2025 | |
| Arms | October 23, 2026 | |
| Balloon Fight | July 22, 2025 | |
| Baseball | July 22, 2025 | |
| Brain Age: Train Your Brain in Minutes a Day! | November 26, 2024 | |
| Captain Toad: Treasure Tracker | August 12, 2025 | |
| Clu Clu Land | July 22, 2025 | |
| Clubhouse Games: 51 Worldwide Classics | June 17, 2025 | |
| Devil World | July 22, 2025 | |
| Donkey Kong | July 22, 2025 | |
| Donkey Kong 3 | July 22, 2025 | |
| Donkey Kong Bananza | July 17, 2026 (Note: Select tracks were released early on September 19, 2025.) | |
| Donkey Kong Country | October 31, 2024 | |
| Donkey Kong Country 2 | November 5, 2024 | |
| Donkey Kong Country 3 | January 7, 2025 | |
| Donkey Kong Jr. | July 22, 2025 | |
| Donkey Kong Jr. Math | July 22, 2025 | |
| Dr. Mario (Game Boy) | October 31, 2024 | |
| Dr. Mario (NES) | March 18, 2025 | |
| Duck Hunt | July 22, 2025 | |
| Excitebike | July 22, 2025 | |
| F-Zero | April 1, 2025 | |
| F-Zero 99 | July 10, 2026 | |
| F-Zero X | November 19, 2024 (Note: Additional tracks from the Expansion Kit were added on April 1, 2025.) | |
| F1 Race | July 22, 2025 | |
| Fire Emblem Awakening | September 2, 2025 | |
| Fire Emblem Engage | April 22, 2025 | |
| Fire Emblem: The Blazing Blade | October 31, 2024 | |
| Fire Emblem: Fortune's Weave (Note: Only select tracks are available.) | August 4, 2026 | |
| Fire Emblem: Path of Radiance | January 9, 2026 | |
| Fire Emblem: Three Houses (Note: Excludes "Thunder" tracks) | August 28, 2026 | |
| Galactic Pinball | July 31, 2026 | |
| Golden Sun | February 10, 2025 | |
| Golden Sun: The Lost Age | September 9, 2025 | |
| Golf | July 22, 2025 | |
| Gomoku Narabe Renju | July 22, 2025 | |
| Gyromite | July 22, 2025 | |
| Hogan's Alley | July 22, 2025 | |
| Hyrule Warriors: Age of Imprisonment | June 19, 2026 | |
| Ice Climber | July 22, 2025 | |
| Kid Icarus (Note: Disk System and NES versions released simultaneously) | May 20, 2025 | |
| Kirby Air Riders (Note: Excludes tracks composed by Akira Miyagawa) | March 3, 2026 (Note: Select tracks were released early on August 19 and October 23, 2025.) | |
| Kirby and the Forgotten Land (Note: Excludes tracks from Kirby and the Forgotten Land – Nintendo Switch 2 Edition + Star-Crossed World) | August 26, 2025 (Note: Partially released on March 25, 2025) | |
| Kirby Star Allies | October 31, 2024 | |
| Kirby's Dream Buffet | November 11, 2025 | |
| Kirby's Dream Land | October 31, 2024 | |
| The Legend of Zelda | April 15, 2025 | |
| The Legend of Zelda: Breath of the Wild | October 31, 2024 | |
| The Legend of Zelda: A Link Between Worlds | May 21, 2026 | |
| The Legend of Zelda: A Link to the Past | March 4, 2025 | |
| The Legend of Zelda: Majora's Mask | October 9, 2026 | |
| The Legend of Zelda: Ocarina of Time | October 31, 2024 | |
| The Legend of Zelda: Ocarina of Time (2026) | September 8, 2026 (Note: Only "Title Theme" was initially available; seven more tracks were added on November 4, 2026) | |
| The Legend of Zelda: Ocarina of Time 3D | July 8, 2025 | |
| The Legend of Zelda: Phantom Hourglass | January 20, 2026 | |
| The Legend of Zelda: Skyward Sword | December 17, 2024 | |
| The Legend of Zelda: Tears of the Kingdom | June 3, 2025 | |
| The Legend of Zelda: The Wind Waker | January 14, 2025 | |
| Luigi's Mansion | April 8, 2025 | |
| Mach Rider | July 22, 2025 | |
| Mah-Jong | July 22, 2025 | |
| Mario & Luigi: Brothership | January 13, 2026 | |
| Mario Bros. | July 22, 2025 | |
| Mario Clash | July 31, 2026 | |
| Mario Kart 7 | May 1, 2025 | |
| Mario Kart 8 Deluxe | October 31, 2024 | |
| Mario Kart 64 | July 15, 2025 | |
| Mario Kart World | June 2, 2026 (Note: Additional "Free Roam" tracks were added on a weekly basis from June 8, 2026 until August 24, 2026, with two bonus tracks also being added on the latter date.) | |
| Mario Paint | July 29, 2025 | |
| Mario Tennis Aces | April 28, 2026 | |
| Mario's Tennis | July 31, 2026 | |
| Metroid (Note: Disk System and NES versions were released simultaneously internationally excluding Japan, where the NES version was unavailable prior to April 15, 2025.) | October 31, 2024 | |
| Metroid II: Return of Samus | October 21, 2025 | |
| Metroid Prime | October 31, 2024 | |
| Metroid Prime 4: Beyond | December 4, 2025 | |
| New Super Mario Bros. | October 28, 2025 | |
| New Super Mario Bros. U Deluxe | July 1, 2025 | |
| Nintendogs | October 31, 2024 | |
| Paper Mario | September 4, 2026 | |
| Paper Mario: The Origami King | February 10, 2026 | |
| Paper Mario: The Thousand-Year Door (Note: GameCube (2004) and Nintendo Switch (2024) versions released simultaneously) | October 7, 2025 | |
| Pikmin | May 29, 2026 | |
| Pikmin 4 (Note: Excludes tracks from Pikmin 4 – Nintendo Switch 2 Edition + Dandori Academy) | October 31, 2024 | |
| Pikmin Bloom | November 12, 2026 | |
| Pilotwings | August 5, 2025 | |
| Pilotwings 64 | August 5, 2025 | |
| Pilotwings Resort | August 5, 2025 | |
| Pinball | July 22, 2025 | |
| Pokémon FireRed and LeafGreen | February 20, 2026 | |
| Pokémon Legends: Arceus | January 28, 2025 | |
| Pokémon Legends: Z-A (Note: Excludes tracks from the Mega Dimension DLC) | October 29, 2026 | |
| Pokémon Scarlet and Violet | October 31, 2024 | |
| Pokémon Sword and Shield | May 13, 2025 | |
| Princess Peach: Showtime! | September 30, 2025 | |
| Rhythm Heaven Groove | July 2, 2026 | |
| SimCity | August 21, 2026 | |
| Soccer | July 22, 2025 | |
| Splatoon | May 28, 2025 | |
| Splatoon 2 | December 3, 2024 | |
| Splatoon 3 | October 31, 2024 (Note: Additional tracks from various post-launch updates and the Side Order DLC were added on April 7, 2026) | |
| Splatoon Raiders | July 23, 2026 | |
| Stack-Up | July 22, 2025 | |
| Star Fox | September 30, 2026 (Note: Select tracks were released early on May 7, 2026) | |
| Star Fox 64 | October 31, 2024 | |
| StreetPass Mii Plaza (Note: Only includes the Puzzle Swap and Find Mii I & II games alongside the Mii Plaza menu themes) | February 18, 2025 | |
| Super Mario 3D World + Bowser's Fury | March 10, 2026 | |
| Super Mario 64 | December 24, 2024 | |
| Super Mario Bros. | October 31, 2024 | |
| Super Mario Bros. 2 | February 25, 2025 | |
| Super Mario Bros. 3 | March 10, 2025 | |
| Super Mario Bros. Wonder | November 1, 2024 (Note: Additional tracks from Super Mario Bros. Wonder – Nintendo Switch 2 Edition + Meetup in Bellabel Park were added on March 26, 2026.) | |
| Super Mario Galaxy | October 31, 2024 (Note: An additional track was added on October 2, 2025.) | |
| Super Mario Galaxy 2 | September 16, 2025 (Note: Additional tracks were added on October 2, 2025 and April 30, 2026.) | |
| Super Mario Kart | January 21, 2025 | |
| Super Mario Land | December 16, 2025 | |
| Super Mario Land 2: 6 Golden Coins | February 24, 2026 | |
| Super Mario Odyssey | October 31, 2024 | |
| Super Mario Party Jamboree (Note: Also includes music from Super Mario Party Jamboree – Nintendo Switch 2 Edition + Jamboree TV) | November 25, 2025 | |
| Super Mario Sunshine | August 13, 2026 | |
| Super Mario World | February 4, 2025 | |
| Super Metroid | March 17, 2026 | |
| Teleroboxer | July 31, 2026 | |
| Tennis | July 22, 2025 | |
| Tetris (Game Boy) | March 18, 2025 | |
| Tetris (NES) | March 18, 2025 | |
| Tomodachi Collection | October 31, 2024 | |
| Tomodachi Life | February 3, 2026 | |
| Tomodachi Life: Living the Dream | April 16, 2026 | |
| Urban Champion | July 22, 2025 | |
| Virtual Boy Wario Land | July 31, 2026 | |
| Wario Land: Super Mario Land 3 | October 16, 2026 | |
| WarioWare, Inc.: Mega Microgames! | January 27, 2026 | |
| WarioWare: Move It! | September 17, 2026 | |
| Wave Race 64 | December 10, 2024 | |
| Wii Channels (Note: Only includes music for the Wii Menu, pre-installed channels, and the Everybody Votes and Mii Contest channels) | October 31, 2024 | |
| Wii Fit Plus | November 18, 2025 | |
| Wii Party | December 23, 2025 | |
| Wii Sports | November 12, 2024 | |
| Wii Sports Resort | June 12, 2026 | |
| Wild Gunman | July 22, 2025 | |
| Wrecking Crew | July 22, 2025 | |
| Yoshi (Note: Game Boy and NES versions released simultaneously) | May 15, 2026 | |
| Yoshi's Crafted World | December 9, 2025 | |
| Yoshi's Island | October 31, 2024 | |
| Yoshi's Story | June 24, 2025 | |
| Zelda II: The Adventure of Link | September 22, 2025 | |

== Reception ==
After its launch, fans highlighted the convenience of the mobile app as opposed to listening to music on the Nintendo Switch system, such as with the music player in Super Smash Bros. Ultimate. Kyle Barr of Gizmodo called the application "surprisingly good", but criticized the small selection of music available at launch, and claimed it to be a worthwhile addition to the Nintendo Switch Online subscription. Jay Peters of The Verge similarly noted the lack of depth at launch while claiming some tracks being non-extendable was a letdown, along with too much of a focus on their "recent musical history" as opposed to their overall history. Fans, journalists, and developers criticized the app for not crediting the soundtrack composers. Initially, critics questioned why music from Nintendo games could not be uploaded to other platforms such as Spotify and Apple Music, which have dedicated sections for video game music, but noted that Nintendo could more easily control its IP under their own dedicated service. Kirsten Carey writing for The Mary Sue called the app "incredibly exciting", claiming the decision to create a separate music streaming service to be a genius move by Nintendo. Abner Li from 9to5Google noted many similarities to YouTube Music, specifically in the application's user interface. At launch, over 500,000 users downloaded Nintendo Music, topping the download charts on iOS. Two weeks after launch, Nintendo Music had been downloaded more than one million times. Nintendo considered the app to be a success, with its president, Shuntaro Furuwaka, considering live orchestral concert tours of Nintendo music to be performed in the future.

After using the app more often, many critics have praised the additional soundtracks added after its initial launch period. Members of Nintendo World Report claimed Nintendo were handling the random music releases very well. They also complimented Nintendo's curated playlists, with one of them claiming the app was "a lot better than [they] expected it to be". Oli Welsh writing for Polygon complimented the app for its extendable tracks, the unique official playlists, and all of their official playlists being automatically shuffled every day, a feature they describe as "randomization and customization the Nintendo way". Weeks with multiple albums released simultaneously have usually garnered more positive reception, such as the 26 soundtracks added for the Famicom's 42nd anniversary. Zack Zwiezen, writing for Kotaku, enjoyed the addition of multiple NES games, but also claimed it included some of the app's worst songs, particularly those from Golf (1984). Other large soundtracks have similarly been praised more often, with Robert Marrujo of Nintendojo praising the inclusion of games such as Animal Crossing: New Leaf (2012) and The Legend of Zelda: Tears of the Kingdom (2023) for their quality and extensive track selections.

Game soundtracks launched as a "special release" garnered some criticism, as only a select few songs were made available instead of the full soundtrack, leading to some fans comparing the limited official offerings to offerings by third parties on websites such as YouTube. Robert Marrujo writing for Nintendojo expressed disappointment in the seven tracks added during a special release for Metroid Prime 4: Beyond, having to wait for the remaining tracks to be added at a later date. In general, Alana Hagues of Nintendo Life felt disappointed by the lack of Nintendo Switch 2 software representation, considering the positive reception towards the soundtracks for Mario Kart World (2025) and Donkey Kong Bananza (2025). Fans reacted similarly, expressing their frustration over Nintendo prioritizing adding Mario Kart 64 (1996) to the app over Mario Kart World. In response, Bill Trinen of Nintendo of America clarified in an interview that adding soundtracks as expansive and highly requested as Mario Kart World take time due to being handled by a small team.
