= Virtual League Baseball =

1995 video game

- North American box art
- Developer: Kemco
- Publisher: Kemco
- Platform: Virtual Boy
- Release: JP: August 11, 1995; NA: September 11, 1995
- Genre: Sports (baseball)
- Mode: Single-player

Virtual League Baseball (Note: Known in Japan as Virtual Pro Yakyuu '95 (Japanese: バーチャルプロ野球'95, Hepburn: Bācharu Puro Yakyū '95)) is a 1995 baseball video game developed and published by Kemco for the Virtual Boy. A sequel, Virtual League Baseball 2, was planned, but later canceled.

== Gameplay ==
Gameplay screenshot

There are three modes of play in Virtual League Baseball: Player 1 vs. computer, all-star game, and pennant race. In player 1 vs. computer, one single match is played between the player and the computer. In the all-star game, the player plays against the computer using a team of all-stars from America, Asia, or Europe. In the pennant race, the player plays a series of games against the computer, using passwords to resume play after turning off the console, instead of saving.

It is a single-player game. Players can receive and enter passwords to skip levels of the game. The game's teams are international.

== Development ==
Virtual League Baseball was developed by Kemco and released in October 1995 for the Virtual Boy.

A playable version of the game was displayed at Electronic Entertainment Expo 1995. At the time, the coding was so broken that it was impossible for the player to hit the ball. Promotion for the game was further hurt by its infamous "chili dog farts" print advertisement which was centered on a photo of two obese men exposing their butt cracks.

Like all other Virtual Boy games, Virtual League Baseball uses a red-and-black color scheme and uses stereoscopy, an optical trick that is used to simulate a 3D effect.

== Reception ==
Reception

Review score
Publication	Score
Famitsu	5/10, 5/10, 5/10, 4/10 (Note: Each of the four reviewers in Famitsu scored the game on a ten point scale)

Nintendo Power praised the game's graphics and "realistic baseball experience", but wrote that it was hard to defend near the fence. One of the magazine's six reviewers recommended the game. Famitsu was mixed-to-negative, with multiple reviewers similarly criticizing the difficulty of defending. GamePro panned it in a brief review, stating, "VLB's impressive 3D graphics seem promising at first. But after a while the shallow gameplay and awful sounds sent it foul. The archaic controls only add to the agony." Scott Alan Marriott of AllGame found the game reminiscent of Major League Baseball for the Nintendo Entertainment System, noting "plinky sound effects, only one stadium, all fielders moving in unison with the control pad (including the infield and outfield!), a batting and pitching interface that relies on one button, and base runners who move at the speed of light. Are these features you want in a 1995 release? Certainly not, especially on a system that's supposed to deliver a 'virtual' experience."

== Legacy ==
Gameplay screenshot from the unreleased Virtual League Baseball 2

=== Unreleased follow-up ===
A sequel, Virtual League Baseball 2, was in development, but was never released, despite receiving an ESRB rating. In 2025, a ROM of the game was found and released online.

== See also ==
- List of Virtual Boy games
