= Mario Clash =

1995 Video game

- North American box art
- Developer: Nintendo R&D1
- Publisher: Nintendo
- Directors: Toru Osawa; Hiroyuki Kimura
- Producer: Gunpei Yokoi
- Programmers: Tsutomu Kaneshige; Yoshinori Katsuki; Katsuya Yamano
- Composer: Ryoji Yoshitomi
- Series: Mario
- Platform: Virtual Boy
- Release: JP: September 28, 1995; NA: October 1, 1995
- Genres: Platform, action
- Mode: Single player

Mario Clash (Note: Japanese: マリオクラッシュ, Hepburn: Mario Kurasshu) is a 1995 action video game developed and published by Nintendo for the Virtual Boy. It is the first stereoscopic 3D Mario game, and a 3D reimagining of Mario Bros. Reception for the game was mixed.

== Gameplay ==
Gameplay screenshot

Mario Clash is a 3D reimagining of the original Mario Bros. arcade game. The objective is to knock all the enemies off ledges. Players control Mario to complete this objective, who can travel in and out of the background by jumping forward or backward. Meanwhile, these enemies can travel between these two planes through different pipes. Each level has a different arrangement of pipes, platforms, and enemies. It has 99 levels, although the player can only choose to begin from one of the first forty of them. However, the game does not allow for the saving of progress through the games, or high scores, once the game is turned off.

Certain enemies, such as the Koopa Troopas, can be jumped on, causing them to withdraw into their shell. At this point, Mario has to grab this shell in order to defeat enemies that cannot be jumped on safely by throwing it at them, either to his right or left or into the background or foreground. Certain enemies can only be defeated if Mario throws a shell from one plane into another, and certain other enemies may have defenses up that prevent them from being damaged. If the player walks into or jumps on an enemy they'll lose a life, and the game ends once they runs out of lives. The game utilizes a scoring system, and a level has to be completed in a certain length of time. Defeating more enemies with a Koopa Troopa shell in a row results in more points earned. Players can utilize a mushroom item which, when touched, initiates Fever Time. This allows Mario to defeat enemies regardless of their defenses.

== Development and release ==
Mario Clash was developed by Nintendo R&D1, with director Gunpei Yokoi, the same team that was responsible for the development of the Virtual Boy itself. Shigeru Miyamoto, one of the Mario series' creators, contributed to the game's design. Like all other Virtual Boy games, Mario Clash uses a red-and-black color scheme and uses parallax, an optical trick that is used to simulate a 3D effect.

The game was originally developed as a straight remake of the original Mario Bros., and was titled Mario Bros. VB.

Mario Clash was released for the Virtual Boy in Japan on September 28, 1995. Mario Clash was added to the Nintendo Classics service on March 10, 2026 for the Nintendo Switch. On July 31, 2026, the game's soundtrack was added to Nintendo Music.

== Reception ==
Reception

Review scores
Publication	Score
AllGame	3/5
Electronic Gaming Monthly	7/10, 8/10, 6/10, 7.5/10
Famitsu	6/10, 6/10, 6/10, 6/10
GameFan	75, 72/100
Next Generation	3/5
Nintendo Life	6/10
Nintendojo	8/10

Despite being labeled by Next Generation as "perhaps the most promising title" for the Virtual Boy before its release, it received mixed reception upon launch. Almost all of GameFan Magazine's staff chose Mario Clash as their favourite Virtual Boy game during their test of the console pre-release due to its combination of platform gameplay with 3D effects. One reviewer praised the game's 3D effects, while both felt it became tedious over time. GamePro's brief review praised the excellent use of the Virtual Boy's 3D feature but hinted that the Virtual Boy hardware did not do the game justice, expressing hope that the game would be released for the Super NES. Electronic Gaming Monthly's four reviewers were divided: Andrew Baran and Mike Desmond complained of loose control which makes it difficult to jump on a target, and felt the game is "okay" but becomes dull after a short while, whereas Mark Lefebvre and Sushi-X argued that the simple gameplay is addictive and that the game makes perfect use of the Virtual Boy hardware. Next Generation commented, "In the end, Mario Smash doesn't deliver the next generation of gaming, it's not addictive, exciting, or even nice looking, but it's a darn good distraction in an interesting new format."

Retrospective reviews were similarly mixed. During a retrospective feature by Australian video game talk show Good Game. the presenters said that Mario Clash tried to revive the series' arcade roots but "wasn't very good. Nintendo Life found its sprites "boring" and "flat," and criticized its lack of a save function. However, they did feel that players would find it challenging if they stuck with it for long enough. Nintendojo felt that it was a "worthwhile romp" and an "innovative departure" from Mario Bros. GamesRadar praised the game, stating: "It actually made brilliant use of 3D... The level designs featured a huge amount of variety, and figuring each one out was enormously fun." Official Nintendo Magazine called it a "fun little game", but criticized the Virtual Boy hardware for causing headaches during gameplay. UGO Networks' Marissa Meli felt that the game's font made it look rushed. UGO Networks later called Mario Clash the low point of the Mario series. Allgame's Scott Alan Marriott said the 3D design gives the game more depth than the original Mario Bros., but that the gameplay is repetitive and has no long-term appeal due to the lack of a save system for high scores. IGN likewise called it a "mildly clever" game held back by the lack of a save feature for high scores, the Virtual Boy's "awkward" controller, and the console's red-and-black display. They also felt it "underrated".

PALGN's Luke called it one of the hardest Mario games ever made.

Mario Clash has been a popular suggestion for a 3DS remake by critics. They also named it one of the five 3D games of Nintendo's past that were most deserving of a rerelease on the Nintendo 3DS, 1UP.com staff called it a good game that would be given new life on the 3DS. In an interview with Nintendo 3DS hardware director Hideki Konno, IGN's Craig Harris said he was surprised a Mario Clash tech demo was not among those created to show off the 3DS console at its premiere event.

Game mechanics of Mario Clash were also used as a microgame in WarioWare, Inc.: Mega Microgames! for the Game Boy Advance and its remake WarioWare, Inc.: Mega Party Games! for the GameCube.
