= Mario's Tennis =

1995 video game

- North American cover art
- Developers: Nintendo R&D1, Tose
- Publishers: JP/NA: Nintendo; BRA: Playtronic
- Directors: Hitoshi Yamagami; Masao Yamamoto
- Producer: Gunpei Yokoi
- Programmer: Mitsunari Tani
- Composers: Hitoshi Fukushima; Morihiro Iwamoto
- Series: Mario Tennis
- Platform: Virtual Boy
- Release: JP: July 21, 1995; NA: August 14, 1995; BRA: September 1995
- Genre: Sports
- Mode: Single-player

Mario's Tennis (Note: Japanese: マリオズテニス, Hepburn: Mariozu Tenisu) is a 1995 sports video game developed and published by Nintendo for the Virtual Boy. It was one of five launch titles in Japan and the pack-in game in North America for the Virtual Boy. The first entry in the Mario Tennis series, the player participates in singles or doubles tennis matches, controlling one of seven Mario characters. Its gameplay takes place from a third-person perspective.

Mario's Tennis was co-developed by Nintendo R&D1, the same team responsible for the development of the Virtual Boy, and Tose. It was co-directed by Hitoshi Yamagami and Masao Yamamoto and produced by Gunpei Yokoi. Yokoi's success with the Game Boy, coupled with a widespread public belief that it was too early for the next generation, led the team to design a system that used stereoscopic 3D to display 2D computer graphics. Virtual Boy emerged from the hardware phase, and Mario's Tennis from the software phase.

Mario's Tennis received a mixed reception from critics, with praise for its graphics and gameplay. Some reviewers were divided on the game's 3D effects and soundscapes, while criticism focused on the lack of multiplayer and content. Retrospective commentary in the years following its release have listed it as one of the best titles for the Virtual Boy, though the criticisms towards the game have prevailed.

== Gameplay ==
Mario and Princess Toadstool as a doubles team preparing to serve (screenshot taken from an emulator without 3D display)

Mario's Tennis is a sports game reminiscent of Tennis (1984), described as a tennis simulator. The player participates in singles or doubles matches with an AI, or in a tournament, choosing between a one-set or three-set match. Singles tournaments allow three games, while doubles tournaments only allow two. There are seven playable Mario characters, each with their own attributes, including Mario, Luigi, Princess Toadstool, Yoshi, Toad, Koopa Troopa, and Donkey Kong Jr.

The action on the court takes place behind the player character from a third-person perspective. The Virtual Boy's stereoscopic 3D allows the player to perceive the depth of the court, allowing them to perceive the distance between a tennis ball and the character. The player can perform serves, forehands, backhands, groundstrokes, volleys, smashes, and lobs. Unlike later installments in the Mario Tennis series, which added gameplay elements not present in traditional tennis, such as power-up items, special power shots, or gimmicks that interfered with on-court play, Mario's Tennis focuses on the fundamentals of tennis. There are three difficulty levels: Easy, Normal, and Hard. The player can increase the difficulty by entering a cheat code on the title screen.

== Development and release ==
Mario's Tennis was co-developed by Nintendo R&D1, the same team responsible for the development of the Virtual Boy, and Tose. It was co-directed by Hitoshi Yamagami and Masao Yamamoto, and produced by Gunpei Yokoi. Mitsunari Tani acted as one of the game's co-programmers, while the music was composed by Hitoshi Fukushima and Morihiro Iwamoto. Yokoi's success with the Game Boy, coupled with the public's general belief that it was too early for the next generation of systems due to the failure of systems like the 3DO and the Atari Jaguar, led the team to devise different approaches. The team designed a system that used stereoscopic 3D to display 2D computer graphics. Virtual Boy was the result of the hardware end, and Mario's Tennis was one of the end results of the software end. The game employs a red-and-black color scheme and uses parallax, an optical trick, to simulate 3D. During production, Nintendo worked on a link cable that allowed Virtual Boy consoles to connect for competitive play. Mario's Tennis was originally planned to have a two-player mode, but the feature was never implemented, as the link cable was never released due to the commercial failure of the Virtual Boy. However, unused multiplayer code remained in the final version.

The game was first unveiled at Game Expo '95, a Japanese event dedicated to next-generation software, and was also shown at E3 1995 under the name Mario's Dream Tennis. Nintendo published the game under its final name, Mario's Tennis, as one of five launch titles for the Virtual Boy in Japan on July 21, 1995. A North American release followed on August 14, 1995, as a pack-in game, one of four launch titles released alongside the Virtual Boy. Playtronic released it in Brazil in September 1995.

Mario's Tennis was added to the Nintendo Classics service on March 10, 2026. On July 31, 2026, the game's soundtrack was added to Nintendo Music.

== Reception ==
Reception

Review scores
Publication	Score
AllGame	4/5
Computer and Video Games	81%
EP Daily	7/10
Famitsu	7/10, 6/10, 6/10, 7/10
Game Players	70%
GameFan	85/100, 82/100
Next Generation	3/5
Super Play	6/10
Total!	80%
Game Zero Magazine	13.5/25
Ultimate Future Games	75%
VideoGames	9/10

Awards
Publication	Award
Game Players (1995)	Best Virtual Boy Game
GamePro (1995)	Best Virtual Boy Game

According to Famitsu, Mario's Tennis sold approximately 8,833 copies during its lifetime in Japan. The game received mixed reviews from critics. GamePro's Slo Mo applauded the game's impressive 3D visuals, variety of tennis moves, and challenging opponents but faulted its simplistic soundscapes. GamePro awarded it "Best Virtual Boy Game" of 1995, over Galactic Pinball and Vertical Force. VideoGames remarked that the third-person perspective was ideal for tennis and that it was easy to distinguish the ball thanks to the 3D effect but criticized the game for not being full color. GameFan's Dave Halverson and Nicholas Dean Des Barres highlighted the game's simple controls and court environments but pointed out the lack of a multiplayer link option.

Computer and Video Games found it easy to determine where the ball was thanks to the 3D depth effect but felt that the game, while fun, was a bit too easy even on the highest difficulty and noted the short length of the tournament mode. AllGame's Scott Alan Marriott regarded it as one of the most entertaining tennis games. Marriott commended its graphics but criticized the lack of a league mode, multiple court surfaces, and additional characters. Danny Wallace of Total! opined that the game was simple yet addictive and very playable. Victor Lucas, from The Electric Playground (EP Daily), felt that Mario's Tennis was a nice introduction to the Virtual Boy. Lucas gave positive remarks to its audiovisual design and good recreation of racket swings but faulted the mediocre AI opponents.

Game Players commended Mario's Tennis for its fun gameplay, ease of control, and pleasing 3D effect, but remarked that while not a good tennis simulator, it was a solid title. Game Players also awarded it "Best Virtual Boy Game" of 1995. Nintendo Power highlighted the game's easy learning curve and fun characters, but the lack of a two-player option was seen as a negative. Next Generation stated that "if you're looking for an addictive title to play on your Virtual Boy, this is one of the best choices you can make". Super Play's Tony Mott commented positively on the characters' humor and found the doubles mode entertaining but felt that the game's 3D was not as effective as expected. Game Zero Magazine's Bryan Carter wrote that "if you're a casual player and somehow managed to pick up a Virtual Boy without this game, I wouldn't recommend going to [sic] far out of your way to hunt it down".

=== Retrospective coverage ===
In retrospectives, Mario's Tennis has been listed among the best Virtual Boy games by IGN, Nintendo Life, and Destructoid. The Rome News-Tribune referred to the game as the only decent stab at tennis prior to Virtua Tennis. Philip Wesley and Ron Price of Nintendojo commended the game's overall graphical presentation but were divided regarding its while criticizing its lack of gameplay depth and multiplayer mode. Nintendo Life's Dave Frear called it a simple but solid tennis game, giving positive remarks for its audiovisual department and excellent 3D effect, but felt that the lack of a multiplayer mode and the lack of additional characters held it back. 1Up.com praised the game's 3D effects but criticized the lack of a multiplayer mode or much to actually accomplish in the single-player mode. GamesRadar stated that the game worked fairly well as a 3D showpiece but noted that its gameplay was rudimentary. Nintendo World Report's John Rairdin highlighted the game's character sprites and decent use of 3D but faulted the lack of multiplayer, unique Mario elements, and shallow gameplay.

== Legacy ==
Mario's Tennis kicked off the Mario Tennis series and is credited as the game that started the sports-related sub-series of Mario video games in general. These include Mario Golf, Mario Baseball, and Mario Strikers. In 2017, hobbyist developer Martin "M.K." Kujaczynski released a multiplayer patch for the game that allows players to compete head-to-head in singles and doubles matches using fan-made Virtual Boy link cables.
