= Vertical Force =

1995 video game

- North American box art
- Developer: Hudson Soft
- Publishers: JP: Hudson Soft; NA: Nintendo
- Director: Hitoshi Okuno
- Composers: Shōji Tomii; Minoru Endō
- Platform: Virtual Boy
- Release: JP: August 12, 1995; NA: December 1, 1995
- Genre: Scrolling shooter
- Mode: Single-player

Vertical Force (Note: Japanese: バーティカルフォース, Hepburn: Bātikaru Fōsu) is a 1995 vertically scrolling shooter video game developed and published by Hudson Soft for the Virtual Boy. It was released in Japan in August 1995 and North America by Nintendo in December 1995. The player controls a starship, the Ragnarok, that must destroy a malfunctioning supercomputer on a human colony planet before it wipes out mankind. Gameplay is similar to Hudson's Star Soldier series, featuring power-up items that increase the player's abilities and parallax scrolling. The player can move their ship further into the background to avoid enemies and obstacles in the way.

Development was directed by Hitoshi Okuno, with music composed by both Shōji Tomii and Minoru Endō. The team originally planned to make the game a third-person rail shooter in the vein of Space Harrier, however the thought of similar games being released for the console later on instead caused it to become a vertical-scrolling shooter. It was shown off at the 1995 Winter Consumer Electronics Show under the working name Shoot'Em Up!. The game received mixed reviews from critics; some praised the game's 3D effects and detailed graphics, while others criticized its lack of originality and for enemy bullets being hard to see due to the console's limited color palette.

== Gameplay ==
In-game screenshot, showing the Ragnarok fending off enemy ships. Akin to all games on the Virtual Boy, it uses a red and black color palette for its graphics.

Vertical Force is a vertical-scrolling shooter video game. The player controls a starship, the Ragnarok, and must destroy the malfunctioning supercomputer on the human colony planet Odin before it annihilates Earth. The Ragnarok must shoot down oncoming enemy fighters and avoid their projectiles and other obstacles within the stages. The Ragnarok can also sustain multiple hits before being destroyed. Some enemies will drop power capsules that can be collected to strengthen the Ragnarok's abilities, such as a wide shot, a piercing laser, and a shield. Collecting additional power capsules will increase the abilities further, such as making the projectiles stronger or the shield be able to take additional hits.

The Ragnarok has the ability to switch altitude into the background, which is used to avoid incoming obstacles from different planes. Enemies will also change their behavior if the Ragnarok is at a different altitude. Throughout stages, the player can find small crafts known as AI Drones, which when collected will help the Ragnarok destroy enemies, each featuring different weapon types. Drones can be damaged if they are hit enough times by enemies, which lets the player store them into a "reserve" box to repair them and allow the Drone to be used again. Multiple Drones can be stored in the reserve space, and can be deployed into battle at any time. Drones can also be used as smart bombs, destroying all enemies on-screen.

The game is composed of five stages, made up of starfields, mechanical bases and tunnels. Each stage features a boss at the end that must be defeated, some requiring the player to switch to the background to inflict damage. Most stages will also involve fighting a mech-like robot miniboss named Bratt, who will learn the player's abilities as the game progresses and gradually become stronger. The player can save their high-scores to an entry table upon losing all of their lives, however these scores are wiped when the system is turned off.

== Development and release ==
Vertical Force was developed and published by Hudson Soft for the Virtual Boy on August 12, 1995 in Japan. It was later released in North America on December 1, 1995, where it was published by Nintendo. It was Hudson's only other game released for the system, alongside a port of their PC Engine puzzle game Panic Bomber. It uses a red-and-black color scheme for its graphics, just like all other games for the console, alongside parallax scrolling to simulate a 3D effect. The development team originally planned to make the game a third-person rail shooter in the vein of Space Harrier, however the thought of similar games being released for the console later on instead caused it to become a vertical-scrolling shooter. It was presented at the 1995 Winter Consumer Electronics Show in Las Vegas, Nevada, under the working title Shoot'Em Up!. The game was directed by Hitoshi Okuno, and composed by both Shōji Tomii and Minoru Endō.

On May 14, 2026, Vertical Force was re-released via the Nintendo Classics service.

== Reception ==
Reception

Review scores
| Publication | Score |
|---|---|
| Electronic Gaming Monthly | 6.75/10 |
| GameFan | 80/100 |
| Next Generation | 1/5 |
| Game Zero | 23/25 |

Vertical Force received polarized reviews from critics upon release; while some praised the game's 3D effects and detailed graphics, others criticized its lack of originality and for enemy projectiles being difficult to distinguish from the background, which many attributed to the Virtual Boy's limited color palette.

Electronic Gaming Monthly criticized the game's graphics for making it difficult to tell where enemy projectiles are, while GamePro disliked its unimpressive enemy designs and lack of originality. Next Generation was the most critical of the game, lambasting its confusing stage layouts, poor 3D effects and uninspired gameplay, alongside it being hard to spot enemy projectiles due to the system's limitations. Jeremy Parish similarly found the bullets hard to track due to hardware limitations, calling it "sloppy" compared to Hudson's Star Soldier series, although noted it was a decent effort in transitioning the Star Soldier gameplay to the Virtual Boy hardware. Japanese magazine Famitsu said that the game felt dated in comparison to other games of its genre already on the market, while also criticizing its graphics for making the enemy shots hard to see. The Electric Playground criticized its gameplay for being bland and for lacking originality, unfavorably comparing it to games such as Xevious and 1942, alongside its "generic" soundtrack and graphics.

On a more positive note, GameFan magazine said that it was a must-own game, highly praising its gameplay, challenge and 3D effects. They also called it one of the system's best launch titles, despite finding Red Alarm more substantial. Game Zero liked its multi-layer depth mechanic for making it stand out among other shoot'em up titles, stating it was one of the system's best launch titles and one of Hudson's best shooting games to date. Game Zero also praised its soundtrack and detailed graphics. Electronic Gaming Monthly compared the game to shoot'em up titles on the TurboGrafx-16 in both gameplay and visuals, while also saying the multiple-depth mechanic was an interesting idea. Parish said it was the most graphically detailed game on the Virtual Boy, claiming it made a decent addition to the console's library. Vertical Force was selected as one of the games to be shown at the "Spacewar!: Video Games Blast Off" exhibition at the Museum of the Moving Image in New York.
