= Virtual Lab =

1995 video game

- Japanese Virtual Boy box art
- Developer: Nacoty
- Publisher: J-Wing
- Platform: Virtual Boy
- Release: JP: December 8, 1995
- Genre: Puzzle
- Mode: Single-player

Virtual Lab (Note: Japanese: バーチャルラボ, Hepburn: Bācharu Rabo) is a 1995 falling block puzzle video game developed for the Virtual Boy. Its gameplay involves the player moving different shapes that descend onto the playing field. The goal is to erase these shapes by linking and ultimately shutting their open orifices together to make them disappear, which causes the player to gain points across multiple levels.

Announced under the working title Chiki Chiki Labo, Virtual Lab was developed by Game News Network under the pseudonym Nacoty. The game was released in Japan on December 8, 1995, and was published in an unfinished state by J-Wing after it discovered Nintendo was planning to discontinue the platform. It only had very few copies printed, and is considered by journalists to be one of the most expensive Virtual Boy titles.

Virtual Lab received mostly negative reception from critics since release towards its presentation, poor use of the Virtual Boy's stereoscopic 3D effects, high difficulty, and lack of replay value. There was some division regarding the quality of its gameplay, though the soundtrack was commended. Retrospective commentary has been equally negative, with some considering it one of the worst games for the platform due to it being unfinished and lacking depth.

== Gameplay ==
Gameplay of Virtual Lab. Players are required to combine pieces, such that these pieces have no open ends.

Virtual Lab is a falling block puzzle game. During gameplay, the player must clear different shapes that descend onto the playing field by linking them, with the goal being to shut their orifices on all ends to make them disappear. The main objective across every level is to make a determined number of linked shapes. The player can also use the bottom and side edges of the playfield to make linked shapes disappear. If the shapes are linked in a certain way, a fairy will spawn to clear the bottom pieces in the playfield. The game is over once any stack of worm pieces reaches the top of the playfield. The player's goal is to gain enough points in order to progress to the next level.

There are 100 levels in total, each with a specific number of shapes that need to be cleared, except for the last, which is endless loop. The player can also adjust the game's speed at the title screen, ranging from "Low" to "Mid" to "Hi", though with "Mid" is the fastest. The game gives a password after completing each level, but there is no dedicated screen to input them, rendering the passwords completely useless.

== Development and release ==
Virtual Lab was created by anonymous video game designer Megumi, a transgender woman. Her employer, Game News Network, developed the game under the pseudonym Nacoty. She was approached by publisher J-Wing about developing a Virtual Boy game, and was given Virtual Boy specifications and development language to do so. She was given no instructions on the game's design, so she had the freedom to design it how she liked it. She only received the development equipment one week before the deadline. She spent her first day checking the equipment, and then 2-8 days were spent creating the game.

Megumi found the Virtual Boy development kit easy to use, and was surprised by the Virtual Boy's discontinuation. When designing the character in the game's HUD, Megumi gave her large breasts, as she wanted this character to reflect her, particularly due to only being able to afford female hormones and not "very expensive surgical procedures." Megumi stated that the character was not envisioned as a teenager when she was designed, and that she was shocked to see the game's manual describe her as such. Upon completion of the ROM, it was delivered to J-Wing. She received no feedback on the game, which Megumi speculated was because J-Wing submitted the ROM to Nintendo right after receiving it.

Virtual Lab was announced at E3 1995 under the working title Chiki Chiki Labo. The game was first showcased to the video game press and attendees at the 1995 Consumer Soft Group (CSG) trade show and later at Shoshinkai 1995. It was originally slated for a December 22, 1995 release by J-Wing in Japan, but was published on December 8 instead and was housed in an eight-megabit cartridge. J-Wing originally planned to give a gift to anyone who sent their password in, but this was ultimately scrapped. Due to being one of the last releases for Virtual Boy in Japan, coupled with J-Wing publishing it under a very limited run of copies to recoup investment after discovering Nintendo was planning to discontinue the platform, makes the game harder to find and more expensive than earlier releases. Virtual Lab became a rare collector's item that commands high prices on the secondary game collecting market, with Wired writer Chris Kohler noting its value went as high as $500 as of August 2010. Virtual Lab was Megumi's final game before leaving the industry.

== Reception ==
Reception

Review scores
Publication	Score
Famitsu	5/10, 3/10, 4/10, 4/10
Nintendo Life	2/10

Virtual Lab garnered mostly negative reception from critics since its release. Famitsu's four reviewers were critical of the game, with a common criticism being that the game is too difficult due to how significant a single mistake can be. They also questioned why it was on the Virtual Boy, suggesting it didn't take good advantage of the stereoscopic 3D. However, one reviewer felt it was both unique and fun. The Japanese book Virtual Boy Memorial Commemorative Guidebook gave it the lowest rating in the publication, stating that the 3D effect of the girl's breasts was unnatural.

Retrospective commentary for Virtual Lab has been similarly negative, with some considering it one of the worst Virtual Boy games. Nintendo Life's Gavin Lane considered it one of the worst on the platform, noting that while it was almost "passably fun" at times, it "never escapes its crushingly dull, repetitive loop." Fellow Nintendo Life writer Dave Frear felt that it had potential with some polish and refinement, but criticized it for being unfinished as well as having a lack of depth, "buggy" controls, dull and frustrating gameplay, and repetitiveness. Concurring with Frear, Retronauts writer Jeremy Parish found its gameplay frustrating and the controls occasionally unresponsive as well. Parish agreed that the game could have been a good puzzle title for the system with more effort placed into correcting its flaws and improving it. He ultimately deemed it one of the worst Virtual Boy titles. Retro Gamer also criticized the title for being unfinished and lacking content. Hardcore Gaming 101 writer John Szczepaniak criticized various aspects of the game, particularly criticizing the game for having "poorly designed and illogical" gameplay. He identified it as a kusoge, considering the "worst offender" of the Virtual Boy library in terms of quality. When asked about the negative reception, designer Megumi expressed awareness that it was incomplete, expressing hope that it could be completed someday.
