= Waterworld (Virtual Boy video game) =

Waterworld (VB 1995 video game)

- Released North America cover art
- Developer: Ocean Software
- Publisher: Ocean Software
- Designers: Steve Woita; Jason Plumb; Shane Moura
- Programmers: Steve Woita; Jason Plumb
- Artists: Shane Moura; Keith Bachman; Jonathon Casco; Mike Cicchi; Adrian Ludley; K.C. Murphy; Alan Pashley; Mark Pitcher; Bill Yeatts
- Composer: Jon Dunn
- Platform: Virtual Boy
- Release: NA: December 21, 1995
- Genre: Third-person shooter
- Mode: Single-player

Waterworld is a 1995 third-person shooter video game developed and published by Ocean Software for the Virtual Boy. It is one of several video game adaptations based on the film of the same name, as well as the only video game on the system to be based on a film.

The game was first unveiled at E3 1995 along with other upcoming Virtual Boy titles, and was released exclusively in North America. Contemporary and retrospectively, it was poorly received by critics, with some considering it to be one of the worst video games. Reviewers panned its gameplay and graphics, but praised its music.

== Gameplay ==
An example of gameplay in Waterworld. The HUD on top displayed the current round, player order, lives and Atollers remaining.

Waterworld is a shoot 'em up game. The player controls Mariner's trimaran, moved around a 3D world, shooting enemies on personal water crafts called "Smokers". The objective is to keep the Smokers from grabbing Atollers (inhabitants of Atoll) placed around the playing field. To keep them from being captured, the player must shoot the Smokers using the L and R buttons on the Virtual Boy's controller while moving around with either of the two buttons on the D-pad.

The player gets invincibility temporary after losing a life, by colliding with an enemy (or hazard). Extra lives are earned each time the player's score reaches 25,000 points.

The game features a multiplayer. By pausing and pressing the "A" Button, it adds additional player. It supports up to nine players, changing between rounds each. In it, players must compete with each other for the high score. The competition wins the player with the highest score, when the game ends, once all their lives are gone.

== Development and release ==
Waterworld was developed and published by Ocean Software. Development of the game took 6 months in total. Like all other Virtual Boy games, Waterworld uses a red-and-black color scheme and uses parallax, an optical trick that is used to simulate a 3D effect. Multiplayer functionality was originally planned, but the Virtual Boy's link cable was never released, and multiplayer was not implemented in the final release.

Waterworld was first shown at E3 1995. Later it was announced in October among the upcoming titles for the system. It was released exclusively in North America on December 21, and was never released in Japan. Due to being a late-released title for Virtual Boy, it became a rare collector's item sold at high prices on the secondary game collecting market. By August 2010, its value was noted at $150.

== Reception ==
Reception

Review scores
Publication	Score
AllGame	1/5
GamePro	2.5/5
N64 Magazine	41%
Nintendo Life	1/10
Nintendo Power	2.95/5

Waterworld was poorly received by critics since its release, some considering it to be one of the worst video games. Scott Alan Marriott of AllGame, expressed the feeling of the game's unfinished state, citing Waterworld's structure for being designed like a "bonus game". Which he found for him to be its "most irritating aspect".

Various aspects of its gameplay were criticized. Sir Garnabus of GamePro panned it for having slow controls, bad collision detection, and the same enemies and victims in every level. Reviewers disliked repetitiveness and lack of variety. Nintendo Power lamented that its variety is measured by a number of Atollers that the player must rescue, and attacking them Smokers.

Graphics were a subject of criticism. Dave Frear of Nintendo Life criticized the graphics as "severely flawed", for which "it can't even gain points for impressing technically". The staff at Retro Gamer described the game's graphics as "[if] it was salvaged from the seabed". Gamabus expressed that lack of any background elements apart from the sunset, makes the game's 3D effect neutralised. In the other hand, Jason Moore of N64 Magazine found the 3D effect to be both fast and realistic, with the graphics being clear and well defined. Thought he noticed resemblanced flaws similar to the film counterpart, "All effects, no content".

The music was generally considered as its highlight for some reviewers. Frear called it "rather good, chilled and relaxed", reminding him that, albeit not being on the same standard as the underwater levels of Donkey Kong Country, he considered it to be the game's "high point in an otherwise thoroughly miserable gaming experience". Nintendo Power claimed it to be the best part of the game, adding that "it shows that Virtual Boy sound can be full and evocative if given a chance". Alan found it to be decent, but repetitive after a while.

In 2004, Steven L. Kent, ranked Waterworld number one among the worst video games of all time.

== Health issues ==
In 2025, John Szczepaniak, while playing Waterworld, experienced temporary color blindness after playing a 2-hour session for the high score, and ignored the recommended breaks each 15 minutes.
