= Teleroboxer =

1995 boxing video game

- North American box art
- Developer: Nintendo R&D1
- Publisher: Nintendo
- Director: Yoshio Sakamoto
- Producer: Gunpei Yokoi
- Designers: Masani Ueda; Shinya Sano
- Programmers: Yuzuru Ogawa; Isao Hirano
- Artists: Makoto Kano; Fujiko Nomura; Yasuo Inoue; Noriyuki Sato
- Composer: Katsuya Yamano
- Platform: Virtual Boy
- Release: JP: July 21, 1995; NA: August 14, 1995
- Genre: Fighting
- Mode: Single-player

Teleroboxer (Note: Japanese: テレロ ボクサー, Hepburn: Tererobokusā) is a 1995 boxing video game developed and published by Nintendo for the Virtual Boy. It was released in Japan in July 1995 and North America in August 1995.

== Gameplay and premise ==
Gameplay screenshot

Teleroboxer is set in the 22nd century, when new types of robots called "Telerobotics" were created by humans. These robots can perfectly imitate the movements of humans and have been controlled and designed by them in order to perform tasks that are not normally achievable by humans. By creating a tournament that pits two of these robots against each other in a sport called teleroboxing, Doctor Edward Maki Jr. has found a way to spark interest in telerobotics. Teleroboxing became very popular all over the world after its conception with everyone believing to be the best. This resulted in the creation of a teleroboxing world championship.

== Development and release ==
Teleroboxer was originally known as Teleroboxing, and was displayed at the 1994 Consumer Electronics Show. Like all other Virtual Boy games, Teleroboxer uses a red-and-black color scheme and uses parallax, an optical trick that is used to simulate a 3D effect.

Teleroboxer was added to the Nintendo Classics service February 17, 2026. On July 31, 2026, the game's soundtrack was added to Nintendo Music.

== Reception ==
Reception

Review score
Publication	Score
Famitsu	6/10, 6/10, 6/10, 5/10

Teleroboxer received mixed reviews. Author Steve L. Kent noted that players of it at an early show were unimpressed with it. He added that these players also complained about headaches, though adding that it made the best use of the 3D capabilities of all the Virtual Boy games shown. It was featured on GamesRadar's list of the five best Virtual Boy games, noting that people were excited to play it when the platform launched. Chicago Tribune's David Jones also compared it to the Punch-Out!! series, noting that it has an edge due to its fun and competitive atmosphere. A retrospective feature by Australian video game talk show Good Game made a similar comparison, though noting that it was less fun. He cited its "stupid hard" difficulty, feeling that the fights were so in favor of the opponents that players "couldn't help but shout obscenities at it". The Los Angeles Times' Aaron Curtiss called it a traditional game, though they don't feel traditional on the Virtual Boy. Electronic Entertainment's Steve Klett called its controls "kludged". They also gave good impressions of it before its release, calling it cool. Wired's Chris Kohler called it "too difficult for its own good." 1UP.com's Neal Ronaghan praised it for its graphics and its gameplay, which he calls intense, but criticized the controls as convoluted. WGRD 97.9 wrote that it was a game that people should "play before they die," noting that it's not the best game ever, but its use of the Virtual Boy's technology makes it interesting.

IGN AU's Patrick Kolan called it an evolution of Punch-Out!!, commenting that it felt like a spiritual successor to it as well. He called it a tough game, feeling that the only thing that made it playable was that players could save their progress. While he also found it to be rushed in some areas, he called it "fun and bitterly hard." He would also call it one of the few decent games on the platform and noted that the use of two d-pads gave it increased dimension in an interesting way. Allgame's Scott Alan Marriott called it a title with a lot of promise that ended up a disappointment. He criticized its controls in conjunction with the high speed of the computer-controlled enemies for making it far too difficult, while noting the sound and visuals as the high points of the game. Nintendo Life's Dave Frear also called it disappointing, though commenting that it gets very easy after players learn the game. Retro Gamer's Stuart Hunt praised its use of the two d-pads and the use of 3D.

GameFan's two reviewers gave it above average reviews; the first said that he could live without it, stating that fans of the Punch-Out!! series might enjoy it, but the controls were too complicated and the pace too fast for him. The other reviewer called it the second worst launch game for the platform, echoing the first reviewer's complaints. She gave praise to its visuals, however. GamePro's "Slo Mo" called the challenge "no-nonsense" and the fighters imaginative, while finding the visuals to be among the best on the system. Next Generation called it a "high-tech" remake of Punch-Out!! for the NES, commenting that its 3D effects were limited. However, they felt that the visual quality was very high compared to other titles on the platform. Nintendo Magazine felt that Teleroboxer before release was the weakest of the titles they saw. Tips & Tricks gave it a rarity rating of two out of 10. Official Nintendo Magazine noted it as the most common Virtual Boy game.

== See also ==
- List of Virtual Boy games
- List of fighting games
