= Bound High! =

Unreleased action-puzzle video game

- Preliminary logo
- Developer: Japan System Supply
- Publishers: JP: Japan System Supply; NA: Nintendo
- Designer: Hideyuki Nakanishi
- Composer: Takaaki Oka
- Platform: Virtual Boy
- Release: Unreleased
- Genres: Action, puzzle
- Mode: Single-player

Bound High! (Note: Japanese: バウンド・ハイ！, Hepburn: Baundo Hai!) is an unreleased action-puzzle video game developed and published by Japan System Supply for the Virtual Boy. It was planned to be released in 1996 in Japan and in North America by Nintendo. In the game, players take control of a transforming robot named Chalvo through a series of levels riddled with hazardous obstacles to avoid across multiple worlds, while destroying or knocking out alien invaders off the area. The project was first conceptualized by designer and programmer Hideyuki Nakanishi, who wrote the idea on paper and placed it within a wall inside the offices of Japan System Supply, with his manager eventually greenlighting its development after seeing it.

Although showcased at various trading shows and completed for release, Bound High! was ultimately shelved due to the failure of the Virtual Boy itself. After its cancellation, a follow-up on the Game Boy titled Chalvo 55 was released only in Japan in 1997. Despite its cancellation, a ROM image of the complete game was leaked online in 2010 by the hobbyist community at Planet Virtual Boy, allowing for it to be played.

== Gameplay ==
Bound High! uses a red-and-black color scheme standard to the Virtual Boy.

Bound High! is a top-down action-puzzle game where players take control of Chalvo, a robot who transforms itself into a bouncing ball. The game's objective is to destroy or knock out enemies from the playfield and figuring out the best way to dispatch them while avoiding hazardous obstacles. Falling out of the playfield results in a lost life and all the previously defeated enemies are respawned. If all lives are lost, the game is over.

Bound High! has four game modes to choose from, each one having their own ruleset and main objectives: Adventure of Chalvo, Score Attack!!, Random Game and Pocket and Cushion. Adventure of Chalvo features multiple sets of levels, with a story centered around Chalvo defending Earth from aliens. Power-ups are also available which help players defeat enemies more efficiently. Upon completing four stages, a fifth stage must be played where players join + and - orbs together to gain points. On every 10th level, a boss must be fought. Score Attack!! is a score-based mode where players attempt to defeat all enemies in a stage in the most efficient manner. Random Game is a skirmish mode where players are placed in procedurally-generated stages. Pocket and Cushion tasks players with getting balls into a hole in the fastest time possible to achieve a high score.

== History ==
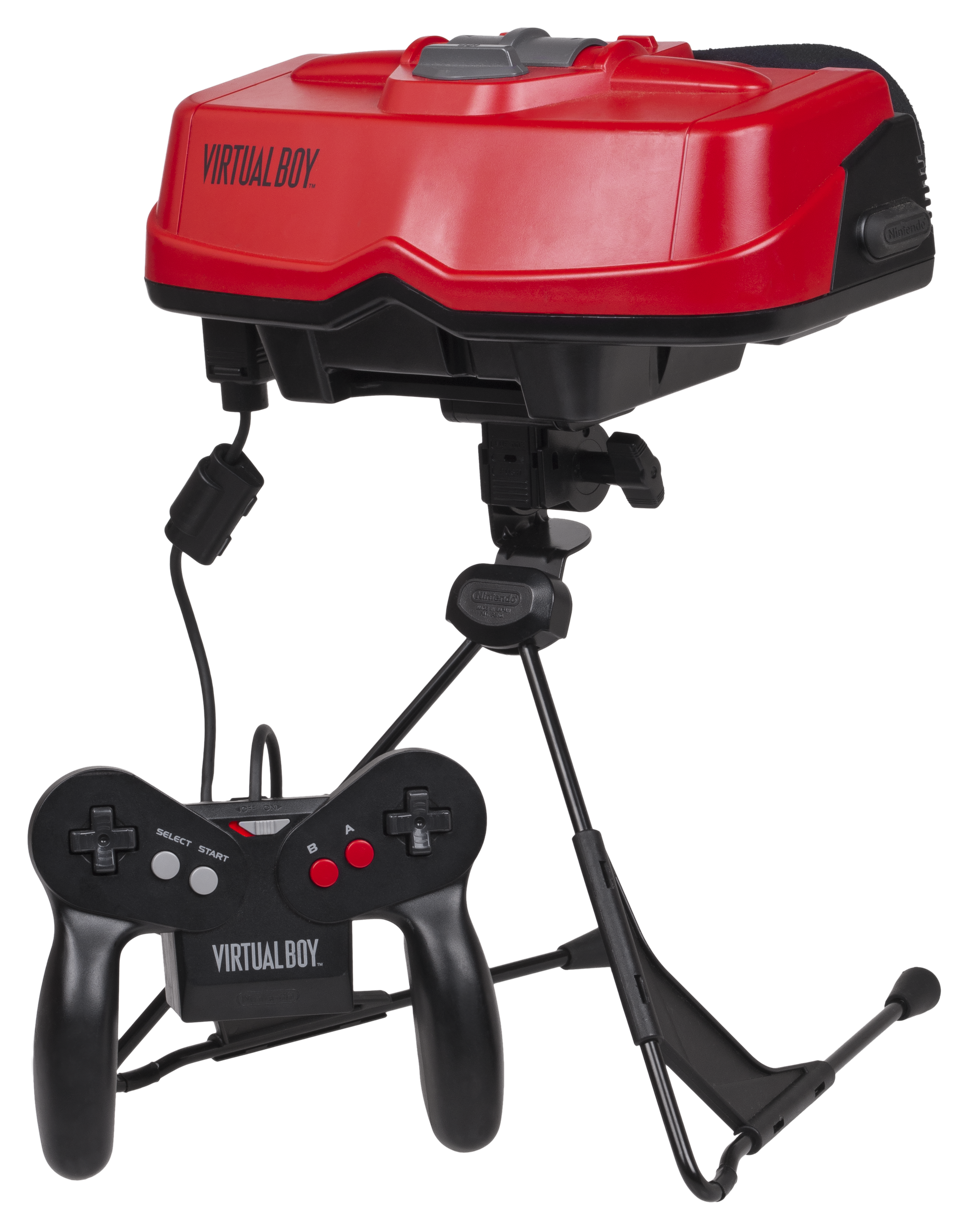
Bound High! was cancelled due to Virtual Boy's poor critical and commercial reception.

Bound High! was conceived by Chameleon Twist creator Hideyuki Nakanishi at Japan System Supply, who worked as one of the designers and programmers on the project as an undergraduate student. Nakanishi had looked at game plans on the desk of the company's president and found them uninteresting. This led to Nakanishi creating a summary for Bound High! and leaving it on the wall for the president to find. This led to the project being greenlit. One of Nakanishi's co-workers handled the sound programming along with composer Takaaki Oka, while Nakanishi handled everything else. More members eventually joined the development process.

Bound High! was first showcased to the video game press and attendees of Shoshinkai 1995, and later had its rights purchased by Nintendo, which originally slated it for a February 23, 1996 release. It was later showcased at E3 1996 and was set to be one of the first games for the relaunch of the Virtual Boy along with Intelligent Systems' Dragon Hopper. It was slated for an August 26, 1996 launch in both United States and Japan; however it was never released due to Nintendo discontinuing the Virtual Boy for being a commercial failure.

On May 3, 2010, a complete ROM image compiled from the source code of Bound High! that was acquired by hobbyist community Planet Virtual Boy was leaked online. A limited number of reproduction copies were created and released, complete with packaging mimicking officially licensed Virtual Boy releases.

== Reception and legacy ==
Prior to the discontinuation of the Virtual Boy that led to Bound High! being cancelled, former Nintendo president Hiroshi Yamauchi called the game as "the most promising title" during his keynote speech at Shoshinkai 1995. In a preview, Nintendo Power referred to its design as "fiendish." They later praised it, noting that it had the potential to be one of the best Virtual Boy releases. 1UP.com's Todd Ciolek regarded it as a notable cancelled game, praising its use of the Virtual Boy's visual design. Retronauts writer Jeremy Parish speculated that the release of Star Fox 2 on the SNES Classic could lead to Bound High! seeing a proper release as well. Writing for Time Extension, John Szczepaniak proclaimed that "No other game in the library showcases the potential of the Virtual Boy like Bound High! does".

After the release of Bound High! on Virtual Boy was cancelled, Japan System Supply took most of the ideas and the soundtrack when developing a follow-up on the Game Boy titled Chalvo 55 that was released in February 21, 1997. Hideyuki Nakanishi was not involved during its development due to lack of interest.
