= Red Alarm =

1995 video game

- Developer: T&E Soft
- Publishers: JP: T&E Soft; NA: Nintendo
- Director: Takeshi Kono
- Producer: Eiji Yokoyama
- Programmer: Mitsuto Nagashima
- Artists: Michiaki Takahashi; Shinji Hasegawa; Yoshikazu Hiraki
- Composer: Ken Kojima
- Platform: Virtual Boy
- Release: JP: July 21, 1995; NA: August 14, 1995
- Genre: Shoot 'em up
- Mode: Single-player

Red Alarm (Note: Japanese: レッドアラーム, Hepburn: Reddo Arāmu) is a 1995 shoot 'em up video game developed by T&E Soft and published by Nintendo for the Virtual Boy. Released as a launch title for the console, it requires the player to pilot a space fighter and defeat the army of a malevolent artificial intelligence called KAOS. The game takes inspiration from the 1993 title Star Fox, and it is one of the few third-party titles for the Virtual Boy. Unlike most of the console's games, Red Alarm features three-dimensional (3D) polygonal graphics. However, hardware constraints limited the visuals to bare wire-frame models, similar to those of the 1980 arcade game Battlezone. Reviewers characterized Red Alarm's graphics as confusing, but certain publications praised it as one of the most enjoyable Virtual Boy titles.

== Gameplay and plot ==
The player engages enemies. Shield and speed meters appear in the bottom corners of the screen. Red Alarm uses a red-and-black color scheme standard to the Virtual Boy.

Red Alarm is a shoot 'em up that takes place in a three-dimensional (3D) graphical environment. As a Virtual Boy game, it features a red-and-black color palette and stereoscopic 3D visuals, the depth of which may be adjusted by the player. The game is set during the 21st century, in the aftermath of a 70-year world war that led to the establishment of a utopian society without weapons. An artificial intelligence defense system called KAOS, which had been used to end the war, becomes sentient and builds an army to wipe out humanity.

Assuming control of a "Tech-Wing" space fighter, the player seeks to destroy KAOS's forces and finally its mainframe. The game is broken up into six levels, each of which culminates in a boss fight. The player uses the Tech-Wing's laser cannons to attack, and its guided missiles to destroy armored enemies. Shields on the craft offer limited protection from enemy fire; evasion is critical. The Tech-Wing may be maneuvered in any direction, and certain levels contain branching corridors and dead ends that force players to retrace their paths. Four camera angles—three third-person viewpoints and the first-person "cockpit view"—are available. When a level is completed, the player may watch a replay of their performance from multiple perspectives.

== Development and release ==
Red Alarm uses wire-frame models (pictured left) rather than solid 3D graphics (right) because of the Virtual Boy's technical limitations.

Red Alarm was published by Nintendo and developed by T&E Soft, one of the few third-party companies approached to develop for the Virtual Boy. According to the console's creator, Gunpei Yokoi, Nintendo tried to "maintain as much control as possible" over Virtual Boy game development so that low-quality releases by outside companies could be avoided. Although T&E Soft was known for golf video games, the design of Red Alarm was inspired by that of Star Fox, a rail shooter for the Super Nintendo Entertainment System. This decision was considered by Patrick Kolan of IGN to be "a departure for the team". Unlike many Virtual Boy games, Red Alarm features an engine that displays 3D graphics: the game world is rendered in wire-frame polygonal visuals similar to those of the 1980 arcade game Battlezone. Because of the console's limited technology, solid 3D graphics were not viable.

Red Alarm debuted in North America at the 1995 Winter Consumer Electronics Show, and it was confirmed as a launch game for the Virtual Boy at that year's Electronic Entertainment Expo. Later that year, Red Alarm and several other titles were released alongside the console, which debuted on July 21 in Japan and August 14 in the United States.

Red Alarm was added to the Nintendo Classics service on February 17, 2026. D4 Enterprise owns the rights to the game, having acquired T&E Soft's trademark and intellectual property in 2019.

== Reception ==
Reception

Review scores
Publication	Score
AllGame	2.5/5
Electronic Gaming Monthly	7.5/10, 6/10, 7.5/10, 6/10
Famitsu	8/10, 5/10, 7/10, 6/10
GameFan	90/100, 95/100
GamePro	4/5
Next Generation	1/5
Total!	67%

Writing for Weekly Famicom Tsūshin, Isabella Nagano called Red Alarm's stereoscopic visuals "amazing", and Sawada Noda recommended the game to all owners of the Virtual Boy. In a more negative review, the publication's Mizu Pin characterized the wire-frame graphics as confusing and frustrating, a criticism echoed by the four reviewers of Electronic Gaming Monthly. A GamePro writer under the pseudonym "Slo Mo" found the visuals confusing as well, but felt that players could adjust to them. Slo Mo and Electronic Gaming Monthly's Danyon Carpenter and Al Manuel praised the title's control scheme, and the latter magazine's Andrew Baran summarized Red Alarm as "a nifty show-off game".

The reviewer for Next Generation saw significant promise in Red Alarm, and believed that its elements should add up to "a fantastic game"; but the writer panned the final product as a wasted opportunity. Similarly, Danny Wallace of Total! wrote, "On the one hand, it's a pretty impressive 3D spacey shoot-em-up, with a real grip on the Virtual world and all those fancy techniques, and on the other it's an often visually confusing, headache-inducing attempt at being something it's quite obviously not." However, Dave Halverson of DieHard GameFan called Red Alarm "a great shooter" with excellent graphics. Co-reviewer Nicholas Barres hailed it as a "masterpiece", and he considered it to be "the one and only reason to buy a Virtual Boy".

A retrospective feature by Australian video game talk show Good Game highlighted Red Alarm as one of the Virtual Boy's most visually impressive games due to its polygonal graphics. The outlet praised it as one of the most entertaining titles on the console. Video game database AllGame said that the graphics made it difficult to play, making it too difficult to navigate your ship between the empty polygonal lines while avoiding enemies. The review concluded that the developers "have created a very detailed setting for which to fight in. Walls have faces stretching out of them like a scene from The Abyss, there are several interesting bosses to combat, and you'll even hear some speech. Deep down there is a fine shooter that is simply hard to enjoy due to the limitations of the hardware ... and that is truly a shame." In 2008, Kolan called it "a really competent shooter" with strong visuals and gameplay. The following year, Damien McFerran of Retro Gamer summarized Red Alarm as "pretty good fun to play", although inferior to Star Fox. Wired's Chris Kohler later opined that the game "kind of sucked".

== See also ==
- List of Virtual Boy games
