= Virtual Boy =

1995 stereoscopic game console by Nintendo

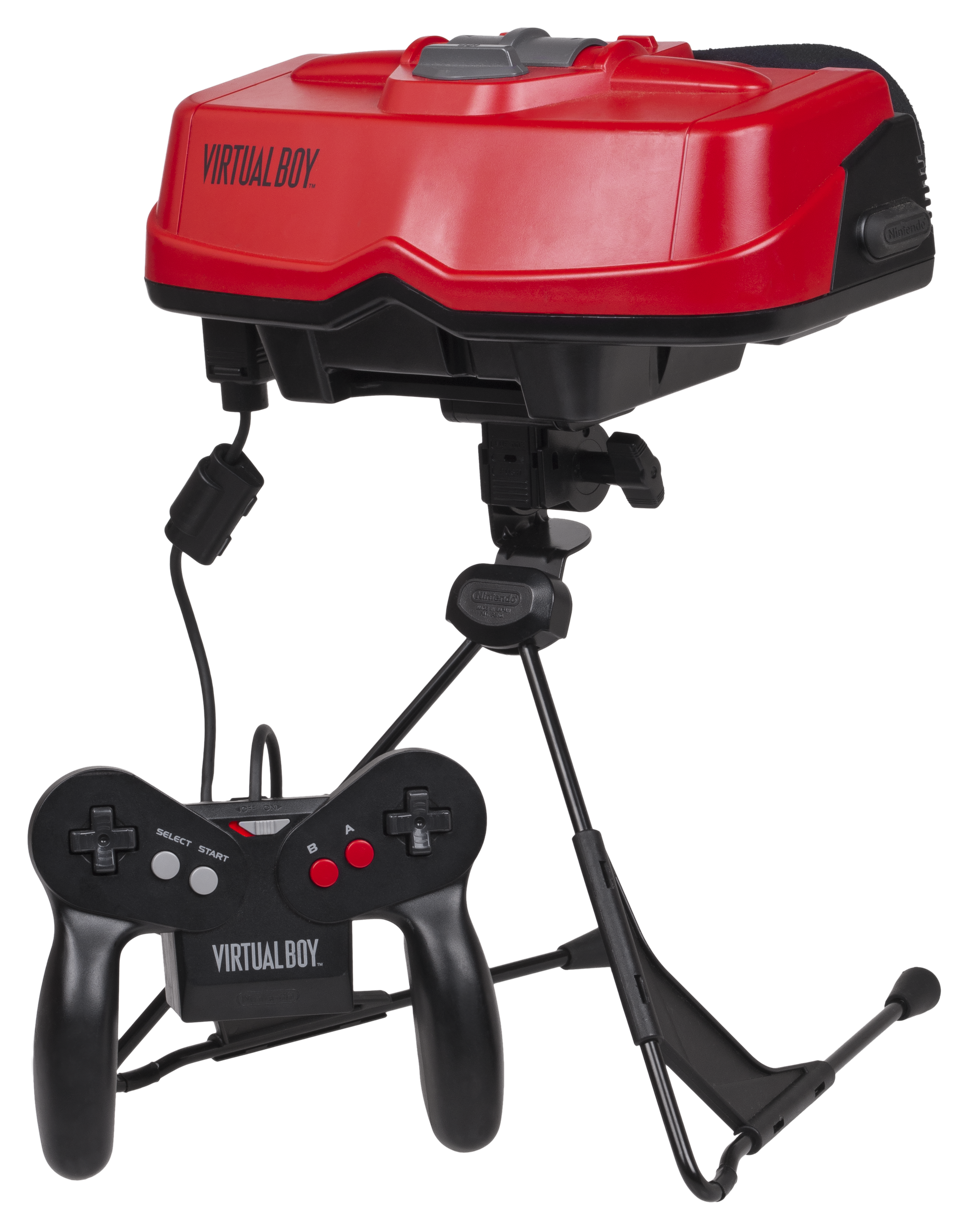
- Virtual Boy with controller
- Developer: Nintendo R&D1
- Manufacturer: Nintendo
- Type: Video game console
- Generation: Fifth
- Released: JP: July 21, 1995; NA: August 14, 1995; BR: September 18, 1995
- Lifespan: 1995–1996
- Introductory price: US$179.99 (equivalent to $380 in 2025)
- Discontinued: JP: December 22, 1995; NA: August 1996; BR: 1996
- Units sold: 770,000
- Media: ROM cartridge
- CPU: NEC V810 @ 20 MHz
- Memory: 64 KB work PSRAM; 128 KB graphics DRAM; 128 KB Video RAM
- Display: 384×224
- Best-selling game: Mario's Tennis (US pack-in game)
- Related: Famicom 3D System; Nintendo 3DS

The Virtual Boy (Note: バーチャルボーイ (Japanese: Bācharu Bōi)) is a video game console developed and manufactured by Nintendo and released in Japan on July 21, 1995, and in North America on August 14, 1995. Promoted as the first system capable of rendering stereoscopic 3D graphics, it featured a red monochrome display viewed through a binocular eyepiece, with games employing a parallax effect to simulate depth. The console struggled commercially, and its limited market performance led Nintendo to discontinue production and game development in 1996, following the release of only 22 games.

The 32-bit Virtual Boy's development spanned four years under the codename VR32. Nintendo entered a licensing agreement with the U.S.-based company Reflection Technology to use its stereoscopic LED eyepiece technology that had been under development since the 1980s. In preparation for mass production, Nintendo constructed a dedicated manufacturing facility in China. Over the course of development, escalating production costs, health concerns related to the display, and the diversion of resources to the Nintendo 64 resulted in the downscaling of the project. Additionally, Nintendo's lead game designer, Shigeru Miyamoto, had minimal involvement in the development. The system was pushed to market in an unfinished state in 1995 to focus on the Nintendo 64.

The Virtual Boy was panned by critics and was a commercial failure, even after repeated price drops. Its failure has been attributed to its high retail price, unappealing red-and-black display, unimpressive stereoscopic effect, poor ergonomics, lack of true portability, and reports of adverse health effects such as headaches, dizziness, and eye strain. Stereoscopic technology in video game consoles was later successfully revived, notably including Nintendo's 3DS handheld console. The Virtual Boy is by far Nintendo's lowest-selling standalone console, with just 770,000 units sold; for comparison, their second-lowest selling console, the Wii U, sold 13.6 million units.

== History ==
=== Development ===
Since 1985, a red LED eyepiece display technology called Scanned Linear Array was developed by Massachusetts-based Reflection Technology, Inc. (RTI). The company produced a stereoscopic head-tracking 12-inch display device prototype called Private Eye, featuring a tank game. Seeking funding and partnerships by which to develop it into a commercial technology, RTI demonstrated Private Eye to the consumer electronics market, including Mattel and Hasbro. Sega declined the technology, due to its single-color display and concerns about motion sickness.

Nintendo enthusiastically received the Private Eye, as led by Gunpei Yokoi, the general manager of Nintendo's R&D1 and the inventor of the Game & Watch and Game Boy handheld consoles. He saw this as a unique technology that competitors would find difficult to emulate. Additionally, the resulting game console was intended to enhance Nintendo's reputation as an innovator and to "encourage more creativity" in games. Codenaming the project "VR32", Nintendo entered into an exclusive agreement with RTI to license its display technology. While Nintendo's Research & Development 3 division (R&D3) was focused on developing the Nintendo 64, the other two engineering units were free to experiment with new product ideas.

Spending four years in development and eventually building a dedicated manufacturing plant in China, Nintendo worked to turn its VR32 vision into an affordable console design. Yokoi retained RTI's choice of red LED because it was the cheapest, and because unlike a backlit LCD, its perfect blackness could achieve a more immersive sense of infinite depth. RTI and Nintendo said a color LCD system would have been prohibitively expensive, retailing for more than US$500 (equivalent to $1,060 in 2025). A color LCD system was also said to have caused "jumpy images in tests". With ongoing concerns about motion sickness, the risk of developing lazy eye conditions in young children, and Japan's new Product Liability Act of 1995, Nintendo eliminated the head tracking functionality and converted its headmounted goggle design into a stationary, heavy, precision steel-shielded, tabletop form factor conformant to the recommendation of the Schepens Eye Research Institute.

[W]e experimented with a color LCD screen, but the users did not see depth, they just saw double. Color graphics give people the impression that a game is high tech. But just because a game has a beautiful display does not mean that the game is fun to play. ... Red uses less battery and red is easier to recognize. That is why red is used for traffic lights.

— Gunpei Yokoi

Several technology demonstrations were used to show the Virtual Boy's capabilities. Driving Demo is one of the more advanced demos; its 30-second clip shows a first-person view of driving by road signs and palm trees. This demo was shown at E3 and CES in 1995. The startup screen of the Virtual Boy prototype was shown at Shoshinkai 1994. A "very confident" projection of "sales in Japan of three million hardware units and 14 million software units as of March 1996" was given to the press. The demo of what would have been a Star Fox game showed an Arwing doing various spins and motions. Cinematic camera angles were a key element, as they are in Star Fox 2. It was shown at E3 and CES in 1995.

As a result of increasing competition for internal resources alongside the flagship Nintendo 64, and little involvement from lead game designer Shigeru Miyamoto, Virtual Boy software was developed without Nintendo's full attention. According to David Sheff's book Game Over, the increasingly reluctant Yokoi never intended for the increasingly downscaled Virtual Boy to be released in its final form. However, Nintendo pushed it to market so that it could focus development resources on its next console, the Nintendo 64.

=== Release ===
The New York Times previewed the Virtual Boy on November 13, 1994. The console was officially announced via press release the next day, November 14. Nintendo promised that Virtual Boy would "totally immerse players into their own private universe". Initial press releases and interviews about the system focused on its technological capabilities, avoiding discussion of the actual games that would be released. The system was demonstrated the next day at Nintendo's Shoshinkai 1994 trade show. Nintendo of America showed the Virtual Boy at the Consumer Electronics Show on January 6, 1995.

Even with cost-saving measures in place, Nintendo priced the Virtual Boy at a relatively high US$179.95 (equivalent to $390 in 2025). Though slightly less expensive and significantly less powerful than a home console, this was considerably more costly than the Game Boy handheld. With seemingly more advanced graphics than Game Boy, the Virtual Boy was not intended to replace the handheld in Nintendo's product line, as use of the Virtual Boy requires a steady surface and completely blocks the player's peripheral vision. Design News described the Virtual Boy as the logical evolution of the View-Master 3D image viewer.

The Virtual Boy was released on July 21, 1995, in Japan, August 14, 1995, in North America with the launch games Mario's Tennis, Red Alarm, Teleroboxer, and Galactic Pinball and September 1995 in Latin America countries. It was not released in PAL markets. In North America, Nintendo shipped Mario's Tennis with every Virtual Boy sold, as a pack-in game. Nintendo had initially projected sales of three million consoles and 14 million games. The system arrived later than other 32-bit systems like PlayStation, 3DO, and Saturn, but at a lower price.

At the system's release, Nintendo of America projected hardware sales of 1.5 million units and software sales numbering 2.5 million by the end of the year. Nintendo had shipped 350,000 units of the Virtual Boy by December 1995, around three and a half months after its North American release.

The Virtual Boy had a short market timespan following its disappointing sales. The last game officially released for the Virtual Boy was 3D Tetris, released on March 22, 1996. More games were announced for the system at the Electronic Entertainment Expo in May 1996, but these games were never released. The Virtual Boy was discontinued on December 22, 1995, in Japan and August 1996 in North America without any announcement. In June 1996, Nintendo reported to Famitsu worldwide sales of 770,000 Virtual Boy units, including 140,000 in Japan. Next Generation reported that 13,000 Virtual Boy units were sold in December 1996. The system is number 5 on GamePro's "Top 10 Worst Selling Consoles of All Time" list in 2007.

=== Promotion ===
Nintendo extensively advertised the Virtual Boy and claimed to have spent US$25 million on early promotional activities. Advertising promoted the system as a paradigm shift from past consoles; some pieces used cavemen to indicate a historical evolution, while others utilized psychedelic imagery. Nintendo targeted an older audience with advertisements for the Virtual Boy, shifting away from the traditional child-focused approach it had employed in the past. Nintendo portrayed the system as a type of virtual reality, as its name indicates. Nintendo also focused on the technological aspects of the new console in its press releases, neglecting to detail specific games.

Challenged by showing three-dimensional gameplay on two-dimensional advertisements, the company partnered with Blockbuster and NBC. A $5 million campaign promoted NBC's late 1995 lineup alongside the Virtual Boy. American viewers were encouraged via television advertisements on NBC to rent the console for $10 at a local Blockbuster. This affordable demonstration provided 750,000 consoles for rent, some in a clamshell Blockbuster case. Upon returning the unit, renters received a coupon for $10 off its purchase from any store. The promotion included 3,000 Blockbuster locations, and sweepstakes with prizes including trips to see the taping of NBC shows. The popular rental system proved harmful to the Virtual Boy's long-term success, allowing gamers to see just how non-immersive the console was. By mid-1996, Blockbuster was selling its Virtual Boy units at $50 each. The marketing campaign overall was commonly thought of as a failure.

== Hardware ==
The CPU is an NEC V810 32-bit RISC chip, making the Virtual Boy Nintendo's first 32-bit system. The Virtual Boy system uses a pair of 1×224 linear arrays (one per eye) and rapidly scans the array across the eye's field of view using flat oscillating mirrors. These mirrors vibrate back and forth at a very high speed, thus the mechanical humming noise from inside the unit. Each Virtual Boy game cartridge has a yes/no option to automatically pause every 15–30 minutes so that the player may take a break to prevent eye strain. One speaker per ear provides the player with stereo audio.

=== Display ===
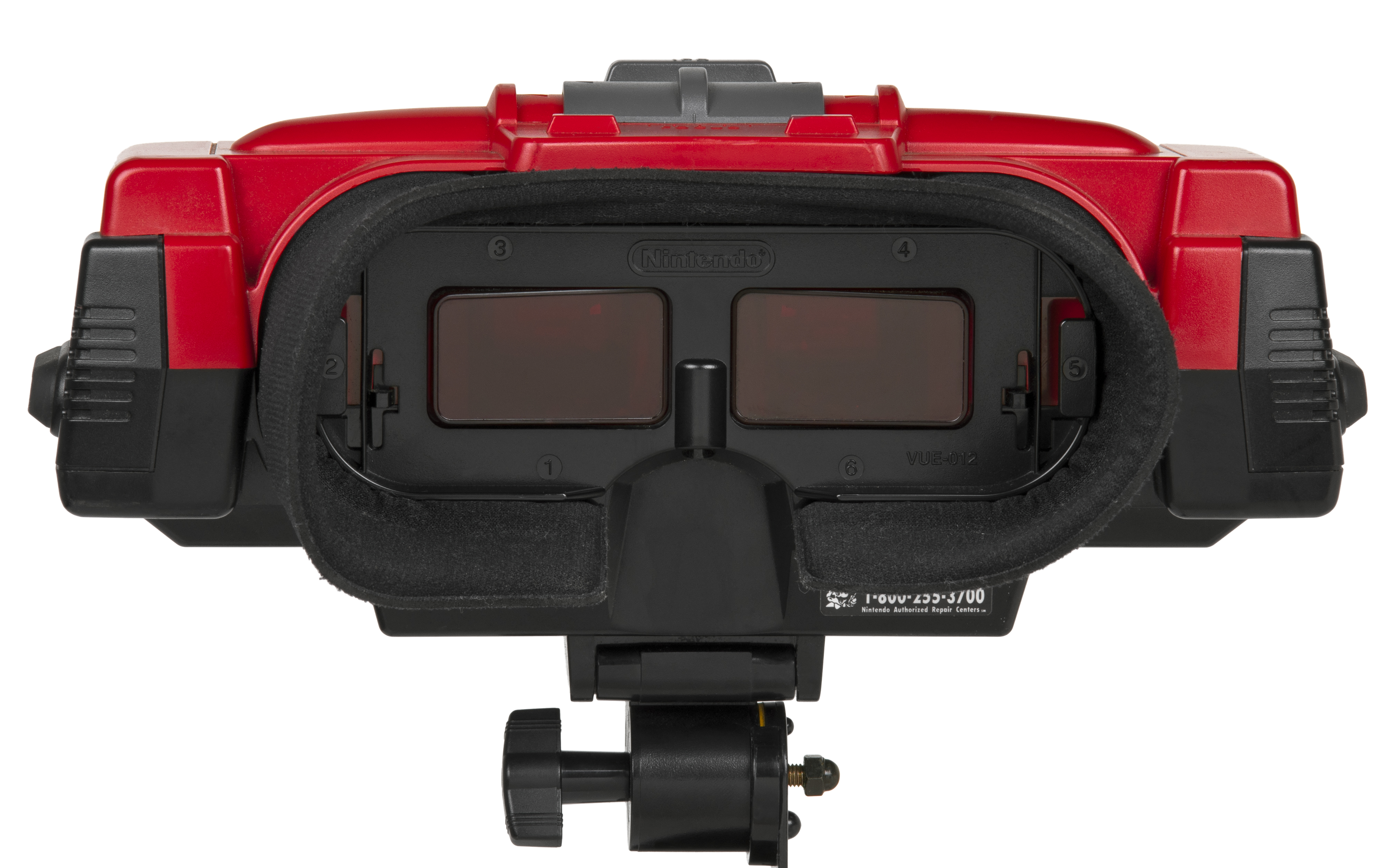
The screens of the Virtual Boy

The Virtual Boy is the first video game console capable of displaying stereoscopic 3D graphics, marketed as a form of virtual reality. Whereas most video games use monocular cues to achieve the illusion of three dimensions on a two-dimensional screen, the Virtual Boy creates an illusion of depth through the effect known as parallax. Like using a head-mounted display, the user looks into an eyeshade made of neoprene on the front of the machine, and then an eyeglass-style projector allows viewing of the monochromatic red image.

The display consists of two two-bit (four shade) monochrome red screens of 384×224 pixels and a frame rate of approximately 50.27 Hz. It uses an oscillating mirror to transform a single column of 224 red LEDs into a full field of pixels. Nintendo claimed that a color display would have made "jumpy" images and have been too expensive. A color display would have required red, green, and blue LEDs; blue LEDs were then considerably expensive. This, plus the other drawbacks, influenced the decision for monochrome.

=== Controller ===
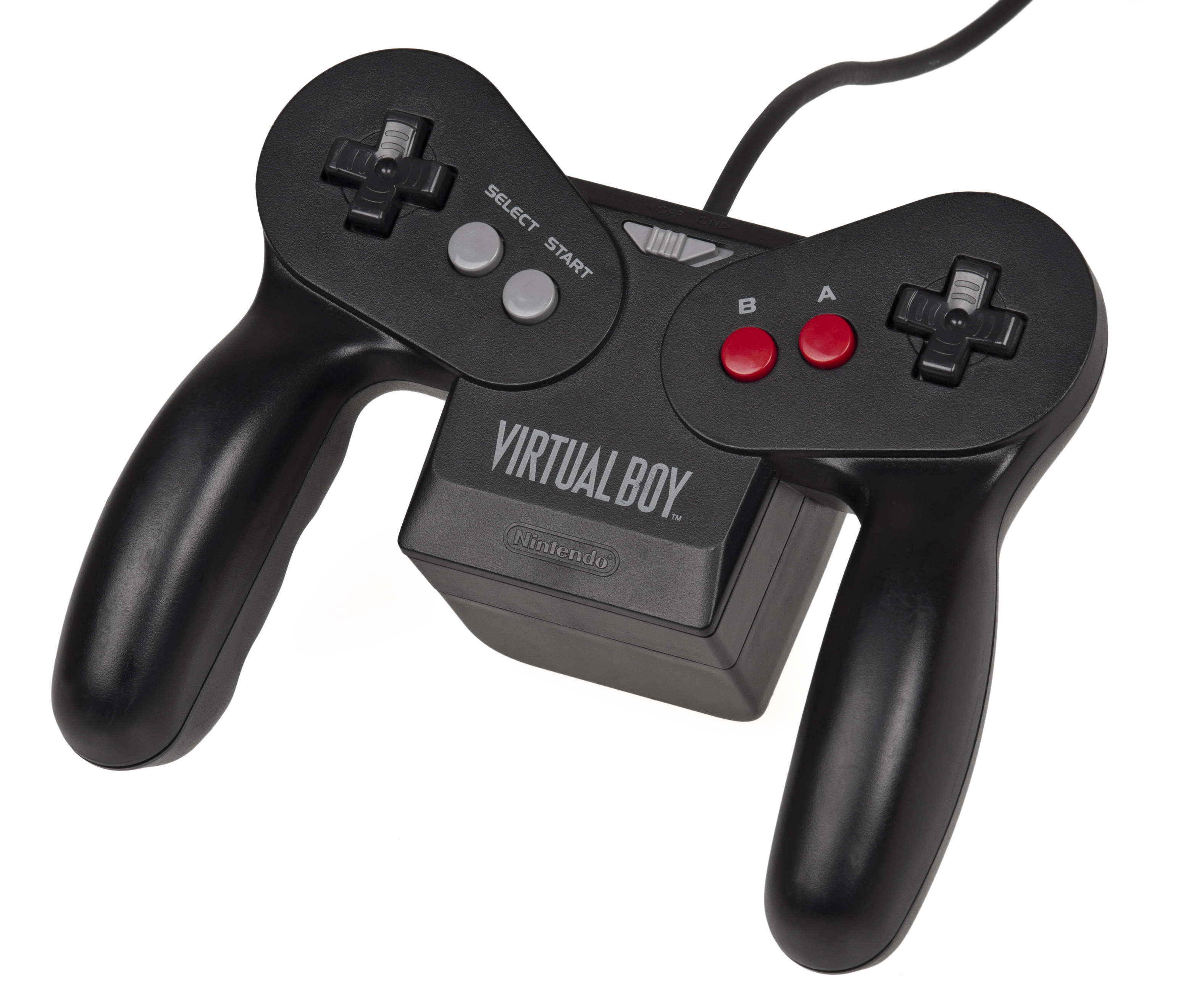
The Virtual Boy controller, and battery pack instead of AC adaptor

The Virtual Boy is meant for the player to be seated at a table, and Nintendo promised but did not release a harness to wear while standing.

The Virtual Boy's heavy emphasis on three-dimensional movement requires the controller to operate along a Z-axis. Its controller is an attempt to implement dual digital D-pads to control elements in the 3D environment. The controller is M-shaped, reminiscent of the Nintendo 64 controller. The player holds onto either side of the controller which has a unique extendable power supply that slides onto the back, housing the system's six AA batteries. The batteries can be substituted with a wall adapter, via a "slide-on" attachment for constant power.

In more traditional two-dimensional games, the two directional pads are interchangeable. For others with a more 3D environment, like Red Alarm, 3D Tetris, or Teleroboxer, each pad controls a different feature. The symmetry of the controller also allows left-handed gamers to reverse the controls, as does the Atari Lynx.

=== Connectivity ===
During development, Nintendo promised the ability to link systems for competitive play. A Virtual Boy link cable was being worked on at Nintendo as late as the third quarter of 1996. The system's EXT (extension) port, located on the underside of the system below the controller port, was never officially supported because no "official" multiplayer games were ever published. Two games were intended to use the EXT port for multiplayer play, but the multiplayer features were removed from Waterworld and Faceball was canceled.

== Games ==
Mario's Tennis, the North American pack-in for Virtual Boy, is converted by an emulator to anaglyphic red and blue format, to simulate the Virtual Boy's stereoscopic display on a 2D display. 3D red cyan glasses are recommended to view this image correctly.

Nintendo initially showcased three launch games and planned two or three per month thereafter. Given the system's short lifespan, only 22 games were actually released. Of them, 19 games were released in the Japanese market, and 14 were released in North America. Third party support was extremely limited compared to previous Nintendo platforms. According to Gunpei Yokoi, Nintendo president Hiroshi Yamauchi had dictated that only a select few third-party developers be shown the Virtual Boy hardware before its formal unveiling, to limit the risk of poor-quality software appearing on the system.

When asked if Virtual Boy games were going to be available for download on the Virtual Console for the Nintendo 3DS, Nintendo of America President Reggie Fils-Aimé said he could not answer, as he was unfamiliar with the platform. He noted that, given his lack of familiarity, he would be hard-pressed to make the case for the inclusion of the games on the Virtual Console.

The hobbyist community at Planet Virtual Boy has developed Virtual Boy software. Three previously unreleased games, Bound High, Niko-Chan Battle (the Japanese version of Faceball), and Virtual League Baseball 2 (a follow-up to Virtual League Baseball), were leaked online. Two additional unreleased games, Dragon Hopper and Zero Racers, were officially released through the Nintendo Classics service in 2026.

== Reception ==
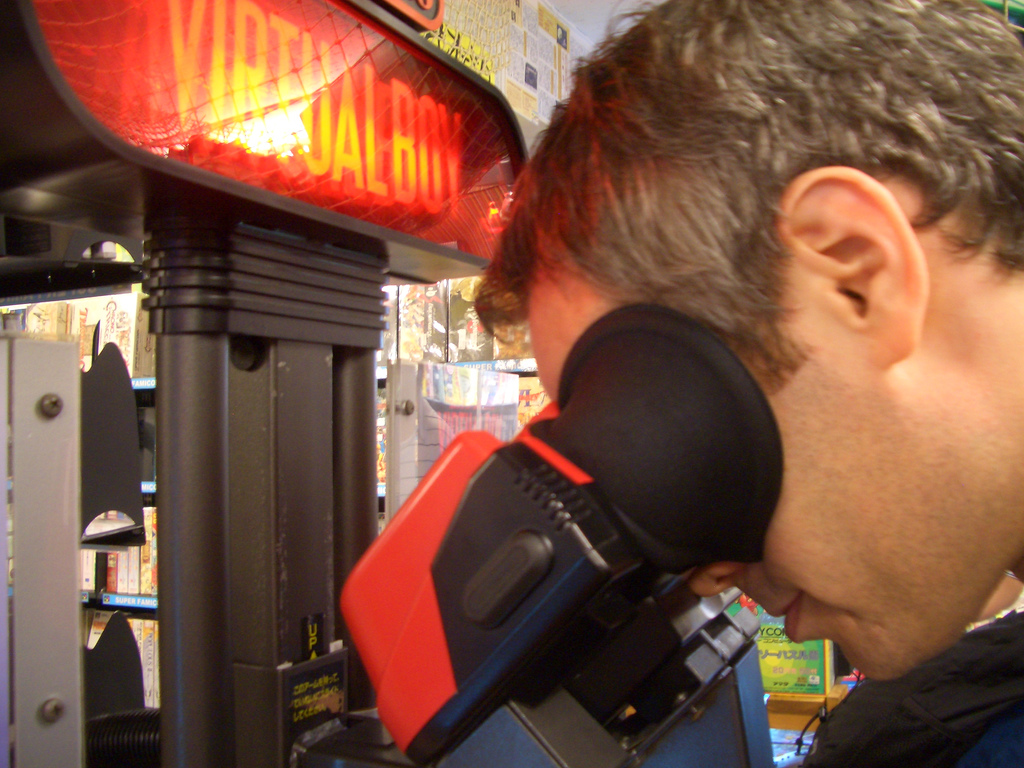
Using the Virtual Boy eyepiece

The Virtual Boy garnered negative critical reviews and was a commercial failure. It failed for several reasons including "its high price, the discomfort caused by play [...] and what was widely judged to have been a poorly handled marketing campaign".

Gamers who previewed the system at the Shoshinkai 1994 trade show complained that the Mario demo was not realistic enough, was not in full color, and didn't motion-track the image when players turn their heads. In the lead editorial of Electronic Gaming Monthly following the show, Ed Semrad predicted that the Virtual Boy would have poor launch sales due to the monochrome screen, lack of true portability, unimpressive lineup of games, and the price, which he argued was as low as it could get given the hardware but still too expensive for the experience. Next Generation's editors were also dubious of the Virtual Boy's prospects after the show, and concluded their article on the system by commenting, "But who will buy it? It's not portable, it's awkward to use, it's 100% antisocial (unlike multiplayer SNES/Genesis games), it's too expensive and – most importantly – the 'VR' (i.e. 3D effect) doesn't add to the game at all: it's just a novelty."

Following its release, reviews of the Virtual Boy tended to praise its novelty but questioned its ultimate purpose and longtime viability. The Los Angeles Times described the gameplay as being "at once familiar and strange". The column praised the quality of motion and immersive graphics but considered the hardware tedious to use and non-portable. In a later column, the same reviewer found the system to be somewhat asocial, but held hope for its future. Reviewing the system shortly after its North American launch, Next Generation said, "Unusual and innovative, the Virtual Boy can be seen as a gamble in the same way that the Game Boy was, but it's a lot harder to see the VB succeeding to the same world-conquering extent that the Game Boy did." They elaborated that while the sharp display and unique 3D effect are impressive, aspects such as the monochrome display and potential vision damage to young gamers severely limit the system's appeal. They added that the software library was decent, but failed to capitalize on Nintendo's best-selling franchises because games from The Legend of Zelda and Metroid were absent, the Mario games were not in the same style as the series's most successful installments, and it lacked a system seller to compare with the Game Boy's Tetris.

Though Nintendo had promised a virtual reality experience, the monochrome display limits the Virtual Boy's potential for immersion. Reviewers often considered the three-dimensional features a gimmick, added to games that were essentially two- or even one-dimensional. The Washington Post said that even when a game gives the impression of three-dimensionality, it suffers from "hollow vector graphics". Yokoi, the system's inventor, said the system did best with action and puzzle games, although those types of games provided only minimal immersion. Multiple critics lamented the absence of head-tracking in the Virtual Boy hardware. Critics found that, as a result, players were unable to immerse themselves in the game worlds of Virtual Boy games. Instead, they interacted simply via a controller, in the manner of any traditional two-dimensional game. Boyer said the console "struggles to merge the two distinct media forms of home consoles and virtual reality devices". Though the device employs some basic virtual reality techniques, it does so like the traditional home console with no bodily feedback incorporated into gameplay.

Many reviewers complained of painful and frustrating physiological symptoms when playing the Virtual Boy. Bill Frischling, writing for The Washington Post, experienced "dizziness, nausea and headaches". Reviewers attributed the problems to both the monochromatic display and uncomfortable ergonomics. Several prominent scientists concluded that the long-term side effects could be more serious, and articles published in magazines such as Electronic Engineering Times and CMP Media's TechWeb speculated that using any immersive headset such as the Virtual Boy could cause sickness, flashbacks, and even permanent brain damage. Nintendo, in the years after Virtual Boy's demise, has been frank about its failure. Howard Lincoln, chairman of Nintendo of America, said flatly that the Virtual Boy "just failed". Retrospectively, John Szczepaniak experienced temporary color blindness after playing Waterworld for 2 hours without taking the recommended breaks after each 15 minute session.

== Legacy ==
According to Game Over, Nintendo blamed the machine's faults directly on its creator, Gunpei Yokoi. The commercial failure of the Virtual Boy was reportedly a contributing factor to Yokoi's withdrawal from Nintendo, although he had already planned to retire years prior and then finished the successful Game Boy Pocket, which was released shortly before his departure. According to his Nintendo and Koto colleague Yoshihiro Taki, Yokoi had originally decided to retire at age 50 to do as he pleased but had simply delayed it. Nintendo held that Yokoi's departure was "absolutely coincidental" to the market performance of any Nintendo hardware. The New York Times maintained that Yokoi kept a close relationship with Nintendo. After leaving Nintendo, Yokoi founded his own company, Koto, and collaborated with Bandai to create the WonderSwan, a handheld system competing with the Game Boy.

The console's focus on peripherals and haptic technology reemerged in later years. The original inventor, Reflection Technology, Inc., was reportedly financially "devastated" by the Virtual Boy's performance, with dwindling operations by 1997.

The Nintendo 3DS console was launched in 2011, as a handheld gaming console with autostereoscopic 3D visuals, without any special glasses. Prior to launch, Shigeru Miyamoto discussed the Virtual Boy. He said it renders wireframe graphics, but its effects are generally used for two-dimensional games with depth-separated planes. He stated that the graphics are not as appealing, and while developing the Nintendo 64, he had ruled out the use of wireframe graphics as too sparse to draw player characters. Finally, he stated that he perceived the Virtual Boy as a novelty that should not have used the Nintendo license so prominently.

In February 2016, Tatsumi Kimishima stated that Nintendo was "looking into" virtual reality but also explained that it would take more time and effort for them to assess the technology, and in a February 2017 interview with Nikkei, he stated that the company was "studying" VR, and would add it to the Nintendo Switch once it is figured out how users can play for long durations without any issues. Nintendo introduced a VR accessory for the Switch as part of Labo, a line of player-assembled cardboard toys leveraging the console's hardware and Joy-Con controllers. In this case, the console's screen is viewed through goggles containing stereoscopic lenses.

Hobbyists adapted Virtual Boy to other displays. Emulation enabled modern stereoscopic goggles such as Google Cardboard, Samsung Gear VR and Oculus Rift in 2016. In 2018, hobbyist Furrtek released a board that replaces the display circuitry, allowing the Virtual Boy to be played on a VGA monitor or television set. On February 25, 2024, a homebrew Virtual Boy emulator for the Nintendo 3DS was released, named "Red Viper", which made it possible to play the Virtual Boy library using stereoscopic 3D.

Nintendo has referenced the Virtual Boy in other games, such as Tomodachi Life—where a trailer for the life simulation game includes a scene of several Mii characters humorously worshipping the Virtual Boy. In Luigi's Mansion 3, Luigi uses a device by Professor E. Gadd known as the "Virtual Boo" to access maps and other information in-game (succeeding the use of devices referencing the Game Boy Color and first-generation Nintendo DS in previous installments). Its menus use a red and black color scheme, with E. Gadd optimistically boasting that the device would "fly off the shelves". As of 2024, Virtual Boy merchandise is sold at the Nintendo Museum in Kyoto, Japan.

On September 12, 2025, Nintendo announced that it would be re-releasing Virtual Boy games through the Nintendo Classics service, available to subscribers of the Nintendo Switch Online + Expansion Pack service for the Nintendo Switch and Nintendo Switch 2. The system displays two parallel images to recreate the stereoscopic 3D effect, requiring an enclosure that the Switch console is inserted into for proper play: either cardboard goggles like the previous Labo kits, or alternatively a plastic mount based on the design of the Virtual Boy hardware. The Labo VR goggles are also unofficially compatible. The first wave of Virtual Boy games launched on February 17, 2026, with 17 total games (Note: Only 16 games are available in non-Japanese regions) added to the service over the following months, including the previously unreleased Dragon Hopper and Zero Racers. An application update on August 4, 2026, added the ability to display the games in colors other than red.

== See also ==
- Entex Adventure Vision, a 1982 video game console with similar mechanical operation
- Famicom 3D System
- R-Zone, a 1995 handheld game console released by Tiger Electronics
- Sega VR, a 1993 prototype virtual reality add-on for the Sega Genesis
- Virtual reality
- Virtuality, virtual reality-based arcade games of the 1990s
