= List of F-Zero media =

Release timeline Main entries in bold
1990	**F-Zero**
1991–1995
1996	BS F-Zero Grand Prix
1997	BS F-Zero Grand Prix 2
1998	**F-Zero X**
1999
2000	F-Zero X Expansion Kit
2001	**Maximum Velocity**
2002
2003	**F-Zero GX**
2003	F-Zero AX
2003	**F-Zero GP Legend**
2004	**F-Zero Climax**
2005–2022
2023	F-Zero 99
2024–2025
2026	Zero Racers (Note: Spin-off game completed and planned to be released in 1996, but cancelled until later being released in 2026 through the Nintendo Classics service.)

F-Zero is a futuristic racing video game franchise originally created by Nintendo EAD and has been continually published by Nintendo, although the company has let outside development houses work on some installments. The series premiered in Japan on November 21, 1990, with F-Zero, (Note: Japanese: エフゼロ) which later was released in the North American in August 1991 and in the PAL Region in 1992. An original installment appeared on every succeeding Nintendo video game console with the exception of the Game Boy Color from its debut until 2004. GP Legend marked the first time the franchise hit a gaming system twice in its lifetime in the United States. The 2004 release of Climax was the last video game in the franchise before its hiatus. Since then, multiple video games were re-released through Nintendo's digital distribution channels. The series currently includes eight released video games, a television series, and video game soundtracks released on audio CDs.

Gameplay consists of racing in futuristic hovercraft and using their speed-boosting abilities to navigate through the courses as quickly as possible in settings like the recurring Mute City, Big Blue and Port Town. The first game was labeled by critics as an influential video game that created the futuristic racing subgenre as well as inspired the creation of numerous racing games such as Daytona USA and the Wipeout series. The series casually centers around the F-Zero racer Captain Falcon and his talented racing and bounty hunting abilities as well as his encounters with the other F-Zero characters.

== Video games ==
Game	Details
F-Zero Original release date(s): (Note: According to Steven L. Kent's The Ultimate History of Video Games, the official Super Nintendo Entertainment System United States launch date was September 9. Newspaper and magazine articles from late 1991 report that the first shipments were in stores in some regions on August 23, while it arrived in other regions at a later date. Many modern online sources (circa 2005 and later) report August 13.): JP: November 21, 1990; NA: August 1991; EU: 1992	Release years by system: 1990 – Super Nintendo Entertainment System; 2006 – Wii (digital re-release); 2013 – Wii U (digital re-release); 2016 – New Nintendo 3DS (digital re-release)
F-Zero Original release date(s): JP: November 21, 1990; NA: August 1991; EU: 1992	Notes: One of the launch titles for the Super Nintendo Entertainment System.; Playable as a demo on the Nintendo Super System arcade unit.; Re-released for download over multiple platforms; the Nintendo Power peripheral in Japan, and as one of the launch games for both the Wii and Wii U Virtual Consoles. It was also digitally distributed on the New Nintendo 3DS.
BS F-Zero Grand Prix BS F-Zero Grand Prix 2 Original release date(s): JP: 1996–1997	Release years by system: 1996 / 1997 – Super Famicom
BS F-Zero Grand Prix BS F-Zero Grand Prix 2 Original release date(s): JP: 1996–1997	Notes: Cancelled future content (Note: IGN refers to BS F-Zero Grand Prix as the planned sequel and BS F-Zero Grand Prix 2 as a "special edition" or "semi-sequel" to the original game. Computer and Video Games mentions the planned sequel to F-Zero was split into these two games.) that was later broadcast in several versions on the St.GIGA subscription service. This was accessible from the Super Famicom's Satellaview attachment.
F-Zero X Original release date(s): JP: July 14, 1998; NA: October 27, 1998; EU: November 6, 1998	Release years by system: 1998 – Nintendo 64; 2004 – iQue Player; 2007 – Wii (digital re-release); 2016 – Wii U (digital re-release); 2022 – Nintendo Switch (digital re-release)
F-Zero X Original release date(s): JP: July 14, 1998; NA: October 27, 1998; EU: November 6, 1998	Notes: The North American release of F-Zero X suffered from a three-month delay due to Nintendo of America's former release policy of spacing the release of first-party games out evenly.; 100th game released on the European Virtual Console.; A sequel of F-Zero, which greatly expands upon the number of playable vehicles and was the first 3D F-Zero game.
F-Zero X Expansion Kit Original release date(s): JP: April 21, 2000	Release years by system: 2000 – 64DD
F-Zero X Expansion Kit Original release date(s): JP: April 21, 2000	Notes: The first add-on disk for the disk drive attachment of the Nintendo 64.
F-Zero: Maximum Velocity Original release date(s): JP: March 21, 2001; NA: June 11, 2001; EU: June 22, 2001	Release years by system: 2001 – Game Boy Advance; 2014 – Wii U (digital re-release)
F-Zero: Maximum Velocity Original release date(s): JP: March 21, 2001; NA: June 11, 2001; EU: June 22, 2001	Notes: Known in Japan as **F-Zero**. (Note: Japanese: エフゼロ); Direct sequel to F-Zero which occurs twenty-five years subsequent to the events in it.
F-Zero AX Original release date(s): JP: 2003; NA: September 2003; EU: 2003	Release years by system: 2003 – Triforce
F-Zero AX Original release date(s): JP: 2003; NA: September 2003; EU: 2003	Notes: Triforce counterpart of F-Zero GX for use in the Arcades.; First announced Triforce game from Namco, Nintendo, and Sega's business alliance.
F-Zero GX Original release date(s): JP: July 25, 2003; NA: August 25, 2003; EU: October 31, 2003	Release years by system: 2003 – GameCube
F-Zero GX Original release date(s): JP: July 25, 2003; NA: August 25, 2003; EU: October 31, 2003	Notes: Originally scheduled for May 2003 in Japan and June 2003 in North America, the title was delayed by two months.; Sequel of F-Zero X, events take place one year after the aforementioned game.
F-Zero: GP Legend Original release date(s): JP: November 28, 2003; EU: June 4, 2004; NA: September 20, 2004	Release years by system: 2003 – Game Boy Advance; 2015 – Wii U (digital re-release)
F-Zero: GP Legend Original release date(s): JP: November 28, 2003; EU: June 4, 2004; NA: September 20, 2004	Notes: Known in Japan as **F-Zero: Falcon Densetsu**. (Note: Japanese: エフゼロ ファルコン伝説; lit. F-Zero: Legend of Falcon); Set in the year 2201, the game is influenced by the anime featuring characters and concepts seen there.
F-Zero Climax Original release date(s): JP: October 21, 2004	Release years by system: 2004 – Game Boy Advance; 2015 – Wii U (digital re-release)
F-Zero Climax Original release date(s): JP: October 21, 2004	Notes: Is influenced by the anime and features characters and similar scenarios previously seen there.; Re-released on the Japanese Wii U Virtual Console on December 16, 2015.
F-Zero 99 Original release date(s): WW: September 14, 2023	Release years by system: 2023 – Nintendo Switch
F-Zero 99 Original release date(s): WW: September 14, 2023	Notes: A free download exclusively for Nintendo Switch Online subscribers.; Reuses assets and gameplay from the 1990 game, and recontextualizes it as a 99-player online battle royale.
Zero Racers Original release date(s): WW: August 4, 2026	Release years by system: Cancelled – Virtual Boy; 2026 – Nintendo Switch (digital release) (Note: While distributed through the Nintendo Classics service on Nintendo Switch, Zero Racers is a Virtual Boy ROM image running through emulation.)
Zero Racers Original release date(s): WW: August 4, 2026	Notes: Originally planned for release in 1996 before being cancelled.; Released in 2026 through the Nintendo Classics download service.

== Other media ==
Title	Release date	Media type
F-Zero: ...そしてスピードの神へ	February 1992	Fantasy novel
Notes: 244-paged fantasy novel authored by Ozaki Yoshiyuki and published by Futabasha.
F-Zero: GP Legend	October 7, 2003	Anime television series
Notes: 51 animated episode series created by Ashi Productions based on the F-Zero franchise.; A video game under the same title was released based on the show featuring the same characters and art style.

=== Soundtracks ===
Title	Release date	Length	Label
F-Zero	March 25, 1992	51:46	Tokuma Japan Communications
Notes: Jazz-arranged musical tracks to the game featuring the Yellowjackets' Marc Russo on saxophones and Robben Ford on electric guitar.
F-Zero X Original Soundtrack	September 18, 1998	52:46	Pony Canyon
F-Zero X Guitar Arrange Edition	January 27, 1999	36:43	Player's Planet and Media Factory
F-Zero Blue Falcon Ending Theme – Resolution	December 3, 2003	18:52	NEC Interchannel
Notes: Features the ending theme of TV Tokyo's F-Zero anime.
F-Zero Legend of Falcon Opening Theme: The Meaning of Truth	December 3, 2003	17:39	NEC Interchannel
Notes: Features the introductory theme of TV Tokyo's F-Zero anime.
F-Zero GX/AX Original Soundtrack	July 22, 2004	2:25:15	Scitron Digital Content
Notes: Two CD set composed of BGM soundtracks to the video games F-Zero GX and F-Zero AX.
