= F-Zero =

Video game series

- Logo since 1998
- Genre: Racing
- Developers: Nintendo EAD (1990-2000); SRD Co., Ltd. (1990); Nintendo R&D1 (1996); NDcube (2001); Amusement Vision (2003); Suzak Inc. (2003-2004); Nintendo Software Technology (2023)
- Publisher: Nintendo
- Creators: Shigeru Miyamoto; Takaya Imamura
- Platforms: Super Nintendo Entertainment System; Virtual Boy; Satellaview; Nintendo 64; 64DD; iQue Player; Game Boy Advance; Nintendo e-Reader; Arcade; GameCube; Nintendo Switch
- First release: F-Zero; November 21, 1990
- Latest release: Zero Racers; August 4, 2026

F-Zero (Note: Japanese: エフゼロ, Hepburn: Efu Zero) is a series of racing games published by Nintendo, developed by Nintendo EAD and other third-party companies. The original F-Zero was released for the Super Famicom in Japan in 1990. Its success prompted Nintendo to create sequels on subsequent consoles.

The series is known for its high-speed, futuristic racing, characters and settings, difficult gameplay, and original music, as well as for pushing technological limits to be one of the fastest racing games. The original game inspired games such as Daytona USA and the Wipeout series.

The series has been largely dormant since the release of F-Zero Climax in 2004 in Japan, although elements have been represented in other Nintendo video games, most notably the Super Smash Bros. and Mario Kart franchises. Past installments have been emulated across multiple Nintendo consoles with the Virtual Console service. The original F-Zero is one of the selected games emulated on the Super NES Classic Edition. F-Zero was one of the launch games for the Super Nintendo Entertainment System: Nintendo Switch Online collection, released on September 5, 2019. After over 19 years of absence, a battle royale based on the original game, F-Zero 99, was released for the Nintendo Switch, exclusively for Nintendo Switch Online members.

== Gameplay ==
Each of the games in the F-Zero series requires the player to beat opponents to the finish line while avoiding obstacles such as land mines and slip zones. The games usually require a mixture of memorization of the tracks and quick reflexes for its fast-paced racing gameplay. In F-Zero and F-Zero: Maximum Velocity, a speed boost is given to the player for each lap completed. Starting with F-Zero X, players may execute speed boosts if they have finished at least one lap, but now in exchange for losing energy when boosting. It is therefore necessary to use recharge strips around courses to replenish this energy, or risk exploding when it drops to zero. Strategically situated dash plates allow boosts without energy loss. In combination with course obstacles, drivers are allowed to attack each other with their vehicle bodies.

The games' planets include different climates and terrains, and are home to many different races and tribes of aliens. There are geographical differences from game to game, but distinctive locations recur, such as Big Blue, Mute City and Port Town. Circuits are usually set on the outskirts of cities or above them situated high in planet atmospheres at an elevation as much as 300 feet (91 m) above ground. They contain anti-gravitational guide beams on both sides of the course that keep them in place. Rich merchants from cities in the clouds or asteroids with almost uninhabitable environments invested their wealth in the construction of racing circuits. Some cities have multiple circuits—circuits not used for the Grand Prix are open to pilots for practice. The dynamic structure of the courses are colossal in scale, as most circuits feature a single lap that spans over six miles (10 km).

The vehicles used to race in these video games are known as "F-Zero machines", which are designed to hover instead of travel on wheels. An anti-gravity unit, known as the "G-Diffuser System" (first used by the Star Fox franchise's Arwing), allows an F-Zero machine to drive at high speeds while retaining a hold of the track, located from a few inches to a foot below it. However, the slip zones, also referred to as the "magnetic field block coat" in the first F-Zero game, blocks the vehicle from retaining a hold on the track. The racing machines developed for these tracks used the latest in this magnetic technology, and are able to perform tune-ups. Out of the over forty-four known machines, only five do not weigh over a short ton. F-Zero machines have a maximum speed exceeding that of sound. This is possible due to the ultra-compact micro-plasma engines used by the machines.

Each machine has four basic performance attributes: body, boost, grip, and weight. Body, boost, and grip are rated on a scale from A to E (A being the best, E, the worst). The higher a machine's Body rating, the more durable it is and the less damage it will sustain in a collision. Machines with a good Body rating are, therefore, able to withstand more attacks before exploding. The Boost rating takes into account the duration of a vehicle's boost, and how great a speed increase it provides. A machine with a high rating can travel at higher than normal speeds for a longer period of time. Grip determines how well a machine negotiates turns. A higher Grip rating means that the player's vehicle will execute steadier turns, while a low one will cause the vehicle to drift more, especially when turning tightly. Weight affects a vehicle's acceleration, grip, cornering ability, maximum speed, and the amount of damage it sustains in a collision. A lighter vehicle is superior in the first three categories, while a heavier vehicle has the advantage in the latter two.

== Plot ==
While there were originally four F-Zero pilots in the first game, this has grown with each game to more than 40 characters in the later games of the series. Each character has their own unique vehicle, story and reason for entering the F-Zero Grand Prix, but the most well known character is Captain Falcon. The winner of the Grand Prix receives a huge sum of prize money, but many pilots have been lost pursuing it.

The F-Zero games are derived from the 20th and 21st century Formula One races and the fictitious F-Max Grand Prix races from the 24th century. The games portray races in the future as having come under the influence of wealthy ex-space merchants. They thought that a fast and violent race would be an effective way to get people to gamble, so the ex-merchants established the F-Zero Execution Project. The F-Zero Grand Prix dates to the 26th century, and is still sponsored by the wealthy elite who originally organized the Execution Project for those events. These races feature the most technologically advanced racing machines, competing in numerous circuits of fast-paced action. It is known for its wild fans, and usually eccentric competitors. Winners of the Grand Prix receive large sums of money, as well as a great deal of prestige throughout the universe.

The F-Zero games are primarily set on a futuristic Earth in the 26th century, although some games take place much earlier and some circuits have been set on different planets. F-Zero X defined the F-Max Grand Prix as the precursor to the F-Zero races which took place during the 24th century.

F-Zero begins in the year 2560 where the human race's countless encounters with alien life forms throughout the universe greatly expanded Earth's social framework resulting in trade, technology transfer, and cultural interchange are carried out on an interplanetary basis. An association of wealthy space merchants created the "F-Zero Grand Prix", in an attempt to add some excitement to their opulent lifestyles. When the first race was held, people were angered at the brutality of the competition, due to the various obstacles and traps along the raceway. As time passed, however, they became accustomed to these dangers, and even began to demand more excitement and danger in the races. Winning the F-Zero championship soon became the highest claim to fame in the universe. This period of time is called the "old-school" F-Zero days where the rules seemed non-existent in F-Zero X.

F-Zero X's storyline starts after the seven-year suspension of Grand Prix races due to the Horrific Grand Finale. The game explains the "Horrific Grand Finale" was a violent and fiery accident that burnt fourteen drivers to death, including Sterling LaVaughn during the old days of F-Zero. A racer named Super Arrow escaped unscathed as the only survivor. No racing was allowed by the Federation after the crash; despite the F-Zero racing prohibition, the sport went underground where many racers went to hone their skills in secret. The crash ushered in the establishment of the "F-Zero Racing Academy", after a speech, by Super Arrow to the Federation Congress, which helped to lift the ban. The fictional competition was brought back with the rules and regulations revised.

F-Zero: Maximum Velocity takes place 25 years after the original in the year 2585. Players race against the descendants of the original F-Zero racers. Maximum Velocity is considered a reboot continuity to the rest of the home console games since it has made no indication of the safety revisions carried forth after the huge accident, in fact it states just like the original F-Zero game, the extreme danger involved when participating in those races.

F-Zero GX does not mention the Grand Finale event, but instead the game states Sterling LaVaughn was racing during the F-Max era and the F-Zero Grand Prix was suspended four years ago. This game states the character Mighty Gazelle was injured in the huge accident four years ago. The Nintendo 64 game mentions that Mighty Gazelle's accident and the accident that suspended the Grand Prix were two separate events.

F-Zero: GP Legend is set in a different continuity and begins in the year 2201. It was continued with F-Zero Climax. These games feature some different incarnations of Captain Falcon, Zoda, and other characters.

== Development ==
Release timeline Main entries in bold
1990	**F-Zero**
1991–1995
1996	BS F-Zero Grand Prix
1997	BS F-Zero Grand Prix 2
1998	**F-Zero X**
1999
2000	F-Zero X Expansion Kit
2001	**Maximum Velocity**
2002
2003	**F-Zero GX**
2003	F-Zero AX
2003	**F-Zero: GP Legend**
2004	**F-Zero Climax**
2005–2022
2023	F-Zero 99
2024–2025
2026	Zero Racers (Note: Spin-off game completed and planned to be released in 1996, but cancelled until later being released in 2026 through the Nintendo Classics service.)

F-Zero, one of the first games to use Mode 7

=== SNES / Super Famicom (1990–1997) ===
The first game in the series originally launched for the Super NES, F-Zero was also the first game for the platform to use a technique that Nintendo called "Mode 7 Scrolling". When Mode 7 was combined with scaling and positioning of the layer on a scanline-by-scanline basis it could simulate 3D environments. Such techniques in games were considered to be revolutionary in a time when most console games were restricted to static/flat backgrounds and 2-dimensional (2D) objects. The result was developer Nintendo EAD creating a game that IGN reviewer Craig Harris called the fastest and smoothest pseudo-3D console racer of its time. F-Zero was one of the launch games for the SNES that Nintendo Entertainment Analysis and Development had approximately fifteen months to develop completely. In Japan, only it and Super Mario World were initially available for launch. In North America and Europe, Super Mario World shipped with the console, and other initial games included F-Zero, Pilotwings (which also demonstrated the console's "Mode 7" pseudo-3D rendering capability), SimCity, and Gradius III.

Kazunobu Shimizu recalls that F-Zero initially began as a sequel to Famicom Grand Prix: F1 Race. The sequel was rejected by Nintendo of America staff, stating that "[r]acing cars should be cooler". Shimizu then stated, “Well, if that's what you say, then I'll make something really cool!” During Shimizu's stay in America, the 1989 film Batman "was a big hit," and so he "bought a bunch of Batman comics and then came back to Japan. And that just happened to be when [Yasunari] Nishida was experimenting with a racing game." He also stated that the futuristic setting was also inspired by the 1989 film "because a futuristic world like the one portrayed in the Batman movie was on my mind." Shimizu added on, saying that "having tyres would have made things much more difficult."

Artist Takaya Imamura stated that the racers in F-Zero was an afterthought, and that "... Captain Falcon was originally the mascot character for Super NES." Imaura elaborated, stating that "[e]ven most people at Nintendo don't know that. When development of F-ZERO was almost complete, I was doing a bunch of illustrations and someone expressed a desire to make a mascot character for Super NES, with a name like Captain Something. So I started thinking about a character who would match the colors of the Super Famicom controller, with some red and blue and yellow."

F-Zero later had a sequel for the SNES that was cancelled, but was released unfinished through the Japanese-only Satellaview peripheral under the name BS F-Zero Grand Prix in 1996. Like most Satellaview games it was released in parts across multiple broadcasts, and featured an update of the first game. It was followed up by BS F-Zero Grand Prix 2 in 1997, an expansion which featured brand new courses.

Nintendo developed an F-Zero spin-off game for Virtual Boy, Zero Racers. It was completed and planned for release in 1996, but was canceled following the failure of the Virtual Boy. It was released through the Nintendo Classics download service on August 4, 2026.

=== Return to international markets (1998–2004) ===
After a seven-year hiatus outside Japan, the series made the transition to 3D with the third installment, F-Zero X on the Nintendo 64. The game introduces twenty-six new vehicles, while also including the four from the original F-Zero game. In addition to a Grand Prix mode, the game introduces a "death race" mode and a random track generator called the "X Cup". In the death race, the player's objective is to annihilate the twenty-nine other racers as speedily as possible, while the X Cup generates a different set of tracks each time played. The hardware limitations of the N64 resulted in the game running at 60 frames per second with thirty machines on screen at the same time, but with little processor power left for graphical detail and music.

Graphical detail was a sacrifice that had to be made in F-Zero X to keep the game at 60 frames per second.

A Nintendo 64DD expansion, F-Zero X Expansion Kit, was released in Japan as the last 64DD add-on disk for the system. The Expansion Kit added a course editor, a vehicle editor, two new cups, three new machines, and new music. The course editor was the main attraction of this expansion, and was praised for its depth, as it was virtually the same program the game's designers used to make the courses.

F-Zero: Maximum Velocity is the series' fourth released installment, but the first incarnation of the franchise for Nintendo's Game Boy handheld. It was the first game developed by the first party subsidiary NDcube. This Game Boy Advance (GBA) launch game returned to the SNES F-Zero's gameplay with a Mode 7-styled game engine.

F-Zero GX was released for the GameCube and developed by Sega's Amusement Vision team, and is the first F-Zero game to feature a story mode. The game was initially titled F-Zero GC. The arcade counterpart of GX was called F-Zero AX, which was released alongside of its Nintendo GameCube counterpart in mid-2003. The game had three types of arcade cabinets; standard, the "Monster Ride", and the deluxe (which resembled an F-Zero vehicle). F-Zero AX had six original courses and ten original characters. However, by certain difficult means, the six courses and ten characters could be unlocked in F-Zero GX.

F-Zero: GP Legend is the second handheld game released for the Game Boy Advance and the second installment featuring a story mode; however, this one is based on the anime series of the same name, introducing a new character named Ryu Suzaku/Rick Wheeler. Unlike the games before it, GP Legend takes place in an alternate continuity set in the 22nd century, instead of following the original continuity set in the 26th century.

F-Zero Climax was released in Japan for the Game Boy Advance on October 21, 2004. Like its handheld predecessor, F-Zero: GP Legend, Climax was published by Nintendo and developed by both them and Suzak. This is the first F-Zero game to have a built-in track editor without the need for an expansion or add-on. Custom tracks can be saved to one of thirty slots for future use and they can be exchanged with other players via link cable. If memory becomes full or link cable connection cannot be done, the game can generate a password for the track; when it is input on any Climax cartridge, the password will generate the track.

=== Hiatus (2004–2023) ===
Takaya Imamura, who worked directly on F-Zero throughout its different incarnations, said in 2003 "hav[ing] worked on the F-Zero series, and seeing the results of the collaboration with Sega, I found myself at something of a loss as to how we can take the franchise further past F-Zero GX and AX".

Edge magazine asked Shigeru Miyamoto in April 2012 regarding a future F-Zero installment. Miyamoto stated: "I think at the time [F-Zero] was a really big surprise, a new thing, a product that made sense and the Wii and DS lacks to create a similar impact". In June 2015, news site Nintendo Life reported that in early 2011 Nintendo of Europe approached Burnout series developer Criterion Games to work on a pitch for a new F-Zero game which they hoped to unveil at E3 that same year alongside the then-unreleased Wii U console, and potentially release the game during the console's launch period. However, the developer was unable to handle the pitch as, at the time, they devoted much of their resources into the development of Need for Speed: Most Wanted for multiple platforms. Criterion co-founder Alex Ward (who left the company in 2014) confirmed that Nintendo of Europe did indeed approach the company for a potential F-Zero game on the Wii U.

In a January 2015 video from Smosh Games, Miyamoto was featured as guest star and stated that a new installment in the franchise could be possible if Nintendo were to develop a unique controller interface for one of their upcoming consoles that would be suited for a new game.

Six years later, the producer of F-Zero GX, Toshihiro Nagoshi said that he would be open to working with Nintendo on another installment if the company were given the opportunity to do so, and that he would make a future F-Zero game challenging for advanced players, unlike the "fun and accessible" nature of Nintendo's Mario Kart series. In July 2023, former Nintendo artist Takaya Imamura cited the massive popularity of Mario Kart as a key factor to why there has not been any new developments with the F-Zero series.

=== F-Zero 99 (2023) ===
F-Zero 99 was released for the Nintendo Switch on September 14, 2023 following its announcement in a Nintendo Direct the same day. The game is a battle royale remake of the original F-Zero taking inspiration from Tetris 99 and Pac-Man 99 having 99 racers on the track at once. The game is available for free on the eShop but requires a Nintendo Switch Online subscription to play.

== Reception ==
Aggregate review scores
Game	Year	GameRankings	Metacritic (out of 100)
F-Zero	1990	83%	—
F-Zero X	1998	87%	85
F-Zero: Maximum Velocity	2001	84%	86
F-Zero GX	2003	89%	89
F-Zero: GP Legend	2003	77%	77
F-Zero Climax	2004	—	—
F-Zero 99	2023	—	82

IGN's Lucas Thomas called the design and style of Mach Rider as an influence to the F-Zero series noting its sense of speed where players have "only a split second to react before you crash into a rock or enemy road warrior". Matt Casamassina of IGN said in 2003 that the F-Zero franchise has remained regarded one of the best video game series in the racing genre.

In 2008, an editor from Pro-G stated F-Zero GX "still ranks as one of the best high-speed racers ever made, but the series has been lying dormant for years".

The Tampa Tribune's review of GP Legend mentioned that "it feels a little strange to see what was an esoteric-but-outstanding racing franchise attempt to go mass-market".

Nintendo World Report gave Climax a 7.5 out of 10. Siliconera praised the fast gameplay and track editor features, but criticized it for feeling more like an expansion pack than a sequel.

Shigeru Miyamoto commented in 2007 that past F-Zero and Star Fox collaborations with outside development houses turned out to be a disappointment for Nintendo. He stated that "consumers got very excited about the idea of those games, but the games themselves did not deliver".

== Legacy ==
=== Anime ===
- F-Zero: GP Legend
- Created by: Nintendo
- Anime television series
- Directed by: Ami Tomobuki
- Produced by: Fukashi Azuma; Yutaka Sugiyama; Kiyonori Hirase
- Written by: Akiyoshi Sakai
- Music by: Takayuki Negishi
- Studio: Ashi Productions
- Licensed by: NA: 4Kids Entertainment
- Original network: TV Tokyo
- English network: US: Fox (FoxBox/4Kids TV)
- Original run: October 7, 2003 – September 28, 2004
- Episodes: 51

F-Zero: GP Legend (Note: Japanese: F-ZERO ファルコン伝説, Hepburn: Efu Zero Farukon Densetsu, literally "F-Zero: Legend of Falcon/Falcon Legend") is a 51 episode animated adaptation of the video game series produced by TV Tokyo, Dentsu and Ashi Productions and directed by Ami Tomobuki, with Akiyoshi Sakai handling series composition, Toyoo Ashida designing the characters and Takayuki Negishi composing the music. Shigeru Miyamoto and Takaya Imamura served as supervisors for the series. It debuted in Japan on October 7, 2003, on TV Tokyo; the final episode aired on September 28, 2004. 4Kids Entertainment licensed the anime series for North American broadcast. According to Kombo, in North America, the show was modified by 4Kids. Fifteen episodes of GP Legend aired on the FoxBox, later 4Kids TV, block on the Fox network in the United States before its cancellation. It was being re-aired on Tokyo MX from 7:30 to 8:00 every Thursday in Japan. It is a reboot of the franchise taking place in the year 2201. Lifeforms from all across the galaxy come to compete in the new racing tournament called "F-Zero".

Police detective Ryu Suzaku (Rick Wheeler in the 4Kids adaptation) is one of the protagonists. He suffers a near-fatal car accident while in pursuit of an escaped criminal named Zoda. Ryu nearly dies and is put in cryogenic suspension until he is revived in the year 2201 by Mobile Task Force members Jody Summer and Dr. Stewart. The Task Force tries to keep prize money out of the hands of unsavory people like the Dark Million Organization run by Black Shadow and Deathborn. That organization is responsible for cryogenically evolving Ryu's old enemy Zoda, leading to Ryu joining the Task Force to help take down Zoda and the rest of Dark Million. While pursuing his objectives, Ryu unexpectedly meets up with the legendary racer and bounty hunter Captain Falcon, as well as several other various racers along the way.

Captain Falcon is one of the protagonists, and is shrouded in mystery. When not racing, he works at a bar that he owns under the name Bart (Burt in the 4Kids adaptation) Lemming. Later it is revealed that he is Andy Summer, Jody's brother, who supposedly died in the accident that revolved around Zoda (unbeknownst to the rest of the Mobile Task Force for the majority of the series). He fights constantly against Black Shadow and the Dark Million Organization, and often lends a hand to the Task Force. Towards the end of the series, "The Legend of Falcon" is told to Ryu by Dr. Stewart. According to the legend, Captain Falcon and Black Shadow are incarnations of light and dark, and in the manner of Yin and Yang, they cannot defeat each other on their own. Also, in the beginning of the Universe, after the Big Bang, six powerful objects called "Reactor Mights" were created, and the one who controls them all gains unimaginable power. It is also revealed that Ryu Suzaku is "The Savior" of the Universe and is destined to finally tip the scales in Falcon's favor. During the final battle, Falcon and Ryu team up to destroy Black Shadow's Dark Matter Reactor with their collected Reactor Mights. But before Captain Falcon fights with Black Shadow, Falcon tells Ryu that the name of "Captain Falcon" is a title given only to the best, that "only the one who can exceed Falcon can become Falcon". After telling this to Ryu, Falcon proceeds to fight Black Shadow ending in Black Shadow's defeat and Captain Falcon's sacrifice. Shortly after the battle, Ryu becomes the new Captain Falcon and driver of the Blue Falcon.

The anime uses two pieces of theme music in the series; one opening theme and one ending theme. The opening theme is called "The Meaning of Truth" and is sung by Hiro-x. The ending theme is called "Resolution" and is sung by AiM. The opening animation for each changes after the first thirty-nine episodes, while the opening animation adds the sound effects for the show's title card after the first four episodes. The final episode did not air with an opening due to the opening theme being played during the final battle's climax scene.

=== Other media ===
F-Zero has appeared in other franchises, most notably in Nintendo's fighting game crossover franchise Super Smash Bros., where Captain Falcon has consistently appeared as a well established playable character. His moveset is almost entirely original; as of Super Smash Bros. Brawl, however, Falcon makes a reference to F-Zero by using the Blue Falcon as his "Final Smash", a powerful, single-use special move. The Super Smash Bros. franchise also features a few stages directly derived from the games, such as Mute City or Big Blue, and includes many other F-Zero characters as virtual trophies, stickers, and spirits. The Blue Falcon appears in Mario Kart Wii as a vehicle, though only small/light characters can use it. The Blue Falcon also appears in Mario Kart 8, albeit via The Legend of Zelda × Mario Kart 8 downloadable content pack. The same DLC pack also adds a course based on Mute City, while the Animal Crossing × Mario Kart 8 DLC pack adds a course based on Big Blue. The Captain Falcon amiibo figure is used in Mario Kart 8 to unlock a Mii costume based on his appearance. The amiibo figure is also used to unlock a Captain Falcon costume in Super Mario Maker. A minigame based on the F-Zero series, Captain Falcon's Twister Race, is part of the Wii U ensemble game Nintendo Land. Several playable characters can dress as Nintendo characters in the Wii U version of Tekken Tag Tournament 2, where Bruce Irvin, Bryan Fury, Craig Marduk, and Raven can take on Captain Falcon's appearance.
