= F-Zero 99 =

2023 video game

- Developer: Nintendo Software Technology
- Publisher: Nintendo
- Series: F-Zero
- Platform: Nintendo Switch
- Release: September 14, 2023
- Genres: Racing, battle royale
- Mode: Multiplayer

F-Zero 99 (Note: Japanese: エフゼロ99, Hepburn: Efu Zero 99) is a 2023 online multiplayer racing game developed by Nintendo Software Technology and published by Nintendo for the Nintendo Switch. It was released as a free download for members of the Nintendo Switch Online (NSO) service. It is the first F-Zero game since Climax (2004), and the fourth 99-style NSO battle-royale game.

Based on the 1990 Super Nintendo Entertainment System game F-Zero, gameplay is adjusted into a battle royale format by allowing the player to compete with up to 98 other online players. The objective is to outlive other players and finish the race. The player is equipped with a power meter which if depleted through damage will eliminate the player from the race. The player can then get a KO from someone with low power and that can extend their own meter. The player can rack up Super Sparks on the tracks to access a road above the track called the Skyway, allowing the player to speed past other players for a limited time.

== Gameplay ==
F-Zero 99 reuses the graphical style, machines, and tracks from the SNES game. By using the Skyway, players can bypass opposing machines at a higher speed.

F-Zero 99 combines the racing gameplay from SNES' F-Zero with battle royale elements. Up to ninety-nine players compete to survive and obtain a first-place ranking. Each player selects from the original set of courses and machines from F-Zero. The speed boost and attacking mechanics are reminiscent of what is implemented in F-Zero X and F-Zero GX. The player's machine is equipped with an energy meter, which serves as both a measurement of its health and as an energy reserve for temporary boosts to its speed; collisions and use of the boost depletes the meter, and once empty it will cause the player's vehicle to explode and be eliminated from the race. Pit areas and dash plates are located at various points around the track for machines to drive over. The former replenishes energy, while the latter gives a speed boost without using up any energy.

Special golden bumper cars traversing the track and colliding racers drop collectable Super Spark orbs that fill a Super Boost meter. Racers may access the Skyway, a floating road above the racetrack allowing them to speed above the competition for a limited time, once the meter is at full capacity. As races progress, players that are below a minimum safe rank limit that usually increases when laps are completed are automatically eliminated. Slower moving bumper vehicles also spawn onto the track during a race, adding another obstacle for surviving players to contend with. Players can utilize a rechargeable spin move to knock away these cars and those of their opponents.

The game's main mode is a single online race with up to 99 players. A rotating playlist of modes includes a Grand Prix mode, a Team Battle mode, and races on more difficult Pro Tracks, as well as a Practice mode. The Grand Prix mode, which sees players compete in a series of up to five consecutive races, requires entry via tickets obtainable through racing in other modes, and points earned in this mode go towards placement on a weekly online leaderboard. Players can also unlock new color schemes for their vehicle and new player profile design elements by completing objectives.

== Development and release ==
Takaya Imamura served as a graphic designer and Shigeru Miyamoto as producer for the SNES game. (Note: It was common practice for personnel to take on multiple roles for SNES game development.) Imamura later served as either a supervisor or designer for numerous future games. When F-Zero GX went gold in July 2003, Imamura commented "hav[ing] worked on the F-Zero series, and seeing the results of the collaboration with Sega, I found myself at something of a loss as to how we can take the franchise further past F-Zero GX and AX." Preference within Nintendo shifted over time to create games like F-Zero and Star Fox in-house. "[Nintendo has been working on increasing] internal staff in a way that will allow us to have more projects going at the same time," Miyamoto explained. "[S]o we can create new games and work on additional old [Intellectual Properties] and still maintain the other primary franchises that people want to see." He claimed a small-scale project or full-fledged game necessitates a novel selling proposition when asked by Edge magazine in April 2012. Comments about needing a new concept followed in the years since by both individuals. However, other Nintendo franchises like Kirby or Fire Emblem saw iterative releases over the years, which Imamura believes is due to sales numbers. He explained Mario Kart is Nintendo's most popular racing game, and "a new F-Zero would cost a fortune."

F-Zero 99 was first revealed in a Nintendo Direct on September 14, 2023, and was released later that day. Developed by Nintendo Software Technology, it is the first F-Zero game since Climax's 2004 release. In a similar vein to the NSO Pac-Man 99, Super Mario Bros. 35, and Tetris 99 games, F-Zero 99 takes the original concept its based on and re-contextualizes it as an online multiplayer battle royale. Digital Trends's George Yang response to F-Zero 99's announcement called F-Zero "Nintendo’s most neglected series" with no proper sequel since then. As a result, critics stated that series fans may end up disappointed with its non-traditional gameplay. (Note: According to Digital Trends, GamesRadar+, and TheGamer) Ash Parrish of The Verge dismissed it as "a simple [NSO] 99 game", preferring a remake or remaster instead, while GamesRadar+'s Dustin Bailey expressed optimism since Tetris 99 was entertaining. Giovanni Colantonio of Digital Trends agreed with Bailey's sentiment.

The post-release content featured tracks and their Grand Prix modes from the original game. Original content such as quality of life improvements, limited-time events, and vehicle rebalancing released over time as well. Five tracks from the "Queen League" were released on September 29, 2023. This was followed by three tracks from the "King League" on October 18. A few Grand Prix tracks were previously available in the Pro Tracks mode. A Classic mode was introduced on November 29 to recreate a similar gameplay experience to the original game by reducing course size, limiting player count to 20 and the aspect ratio to 4:3, removing the Skyway and spin attack, and reintroducing the original boost mechanics. The January 2024 update applied private lobbies accessible via 4-digit pass codes and hidden tracks that occasionally appear while horizontally-flipped tracks were added two months later. Five tracks and machine designs from BS F-Zero Grand Prix's Ace League were released in October 2024.

== Reception ==
Reception

Aggregate scores
Aggregator	Score
Metacritic	82/100
OpenCritic	90% recommend

Review scores
Publication	Score
Hardcore Gamer	4/5
Jeuxvideo.com	14/20
Nintendo Life	9/10
PC Games (DE)	8/10

F-Zero 99 received "generally favorable" reviews upon its release. It holds an average of 82/100 on aggregate website Metacritic. Fellow review aggregator OpenCritic assessed that the game received "mighty" approval, being recommended by 90% of critics. The game was nominated for "Racing Game of the Year" at the 27th Annual D.I.C.E. Awards held by the Academy of Interactive Arts & Sciences. Nintendo Life's Charlie Wacholz assured readers that the SNES game was already a small elimination-style battle royale that F-Zero 99 expanded into a much grander scale, writing the additional players "doesn't just feel perfect for F-Zero, it feels natural." Rhys Wood of TechRadar echoed this enthusiasm writing its finesse gameplay with additional players was exhilarating and stressful making it infeasible to replay the SNES game. Reviewers including Wacholz, Eurogamer's Ed Nightingale, and PC Games' Christopher Holler felt gameplay can be chaotic thus requiring players to use the spin attack defensively. Holler lamented over this and Nightingale shared a similar opinion lambasting the pinball machine-like races as "tumultuous carnage."

Most publications agreed that the updated game mechanics were by far among the best features; Wood said F-Zero 99 has "a level of depth here that hasn’t really been seen in the series up to this point", and Colantonio added these short races are highly nuanced forcing players into frequent risk and reward decision-making. The sacrificial energy system to boost and Skyway were singled out as particularly strong features; Wacholz highlighted experienced players benefit from timing Skyway activation, while Hardcore Gamer's Jordan Helm reflected the same opinion for timing the boost mechanic. Some reviewers welcomed the rival system as a personal challenge. Helm thought its clever short-term accomplishments offered players another goal instead of a first place ranking. Jeuxvideo.com's Charlanmhg mentioned the system helps with monitoring progression and skill level.

Reviewers felt that the content at launch was a weakness, Helm blames F-Zero 99's lack thereof on the source material's sparse 15 tracks, especially the highly redundant online course selection. Jess Lee of Digital Spy explained Mute City I and Big Blue are commonly chosen, and Charlanmhg agreed adding the rotation of events also quickly gets dull. The Grand Prix is considered a better take on the battle royale formula since racers are eliminated per round. Colantonio thought the Grand Prix helped alleviate the game's weird middle-ground between battle royale and traditional racing, elaborating the lack of having a last man standing removed some tension compared to Tetris 99. While he was somewhat disconcerted by it being part of a rotation instead of the main mode, Wacholz was more critical due to the ticket entry fee. Overall, Holler noted the higher priory of placement over survival may disappoint classic battle royale players.

Some critics who do not consider F-Zero 99 as an original and complete installment speculated what its release meant for future games. Nightingale reflected on Miyamoto's pre-release thoughts welcoming its 99-player count as an optional part of a future full-fledged game, but showed more enthusiasm for the potential of multiple online modes. Colantonio and Wood thought F-Zero 99 created a foundation for the franchise. Colantonio pondered if this is the beginning of Nintendo ascertaining how to distinguish its racing series from the competition. He felt the game backtracked from what GX perfected speculating that perhaps it is a "low-pressure way to gauge how serious its loudest fans are about a revival." Wood agreed with the idea of performance metrics, theorizing a stable and healthy player base could incentivize the company to release an original game.
