= F-Zero (video game) =

1990 racing game

- North American box art
- Developer: Nintendo EAD
- Publisher: Nintendo
- Director: Kazunobu Shimizu
- Producer: Shigeru Miyamoto
- Programmer: Yasunari Nishida
- Artist: Takaya Imamura
- Composers: Yumiko Kanki; Naoto Ishida
- Series: F-Zero
- Platform: Super Nintendo Entertainment System
- Release: JP: November 21, 1990; NA: August 23, 1991; EU: 1992
- Genre: Racing
- Mode: Single-player

F-Zero (Note: Japanese: エフゼロ, Hepburn: Efu Zero) is a 1990 racing game developed and published by Nintendo for the Super Nintendo Entertainment System (SNES). It was released in Japan on November 21, 1990, in North America in August 1991, and in Europe in 1992. F-Zero is the first game in the F-Zero series and was a launch game for the SNES. F-Zero has been rereleased for the Virtual Console and Nintendo Classics services on various Nintendo platforms, and as part of the Super NES Classic Edition in 2017.

F-Zero takes place in 2560, when multi-billionaires have created a new entertainment based on Formula One races called "F-Zero". The player can choose between one of four characters, each with their own hovercar. The player can race against computer-controlled characters in 15 tracks divided into three leagues.

F-Zero has been acknowledged by critics for setting the standard for the racing genre and the creation of its futuristic subgenre. Critics lauded F-Zero for its fast and challenging gameplay, variety of tracks, and extensive use of the Mode 7 graphics mode. This graphics-rendering technique was an innovative technological achievement at the time that made racing games more realistic. It is credited for reinvigorating the genre and inspiring the future creation of numerous racing games. A sequel, F-Zero X, was released in 1998 for the Nintendo 64.

== Gameplay ==
Mode 7 allows the track to be scaled and rotated around the vehicle to simulate a 3D environment.

F-Zero is a futuristic racing game in which players compete in a high-speed racing tournament called "F-Zero". There are four playable characters in F-Zero, who each have their own selectable hovercar with unique performance abilities. The objective is to beat opponents to the finish line while avoiding hazards such as slip zones and magnets that pull the vehicle off-center in an effort to make the player damage their vehicle or fall completely off the track. Each machine has a power meter, which serves as a measurement of the machine's durability; it decreases when the machine collides with land mines, the side of the track or another vehicle. Energy can be replenished by driving over pit areas placed along the home straight or nearby.

A race in F-Zero consists of five laps around the track. The player must complete each lap in a successively higher place to avoid disqualification from the race. For each lap completed, the player is rewarded with an approximate four-second speed boost called the "Super Jet" and a number of points determined by place. An on-screen display will be shaded green to indicate that a boost can be used; however, the player is limited to saving up to three at a time. If a certain number of points are accumulated, an extra "spare machine" is acquired, which gives the player another chance to retry the course. Tracks may feature two methods for temporarily boosting speeds; jump plates launch vehicles into the air thus providing additional acceleration for those not at full speed and dash zones greatly increases the racer's speed on the ground. F-Zero includes two modes of play. In the Grand Prix mode, the player chooses a league and races against other vehicles through each track in that league while avoiding disqualification. The Practice mode allows the player to practice seven of the courses from the Grand Prix mode.

F-Zero has a total of fifteen tracks divided into three leagues ordered by increasing difficulty: Knight, Queen, and King. Furthermore, each league has four selectable difficulty levels: beginner, standard, expert, and master. The multiple courses of Death Wind, Port Town, and Red Canyon have a pathway that is not accessible unless the player is on another iteration of those tracks, which then in turn closes the path previously available. Unlike most F-Zero games, there are three iterations of Mute City that show it in either a day, evening, or night setting with slightly different configurations. In BS F-Zero 2, Mute City IV continued the theme with an early morning setting.

== Setting ==
F-Zero is set in the year 2560, when humanity's multiple encounters with alien life forms had resulted in the expansion of Earth's social framework. This led to commercial, technological and cultural interchanges between planets. The multi-billionaires who earned their wealth through intergalactic trade were mainly satisfied with their lifestyles, although most coveted more entertainment in their lives. This resulted in a new entertainment based on the Formula One races to be founded with vehicles that could hover one foot above the track. These Grand Prix races were soon named "F-Zero" after a rise in popularity of the races. The game introduced the first set of F-Zero racers: Captain Falcon, Dr. Stewart, Pico, and Samurai Goroh. IGN claimed Captain Falcon "was thrust into the limelight" in this game since he was the "star character". An eight-page comic was included in its SNES manual that carried the reader through one of Captain Falcon's bounty missions.

== Development ==
F-Zero was produced by Shigeru Miyamoto and directed by Kazunobu Shimizu, who also worked on art. Takaya Imamura, one of the art designers, was surprised to be able to so freely design the characters and courses as he wanted since it was his first game. Yasunari Nishida served as the main programmer. Nine people including three programmers worked in house on F-Zero. It was common practice for personnel to take on multiple roles for SNES game development.

F-Zero uses Mode 7, a form of texture mapping that allows a raster graphical plane to be rotated and scaled freely, simulating the appearance of 3D environments without processing any polygons. The Mode 7 rendering applied in F-Zero consists of a single-layer which is scaled and rotated around the vehicle. This pseudo-3D capability of the SNES was designed to be represented by the game. 1UP.com's Jeremy Parish stated that F-Zero and Pilotwings "existed almost entirely for the sake of showing [the system's pseudo-3D capabilities] off" as they outclassed the competition.

== Release ==
F-Zero was released as a launch game for the SNES in Japan on November 21, 1990, in North America in August 1991, (Note: According to Stephen Kent's The Ultimate History of Video Games, the official SNES launch date was September 9. Newspaper and magazine articles from late 1991 report that the first shipments were in stores in some regions on August 23, while it arrived in other regions at a later date. Many modern online sources (circa 2005 and later) report mid-August.) and in Europe in 1992. F-Zero was downloadable over the Nintendo Power peripheral in Japan and was released as a demo on the Nintendo Super System in 1991. An F-Zero jazz album was released on March 25, 1992, in Japan by Tokuma Japan Communications. It features twelve tracks on a single disc composed by Yumiko Kanki and Naoto Ishida, and arranged by Robert Hill and Michiko Hill. It also features Marc Russo (saxophones) of the Yellowjackets and Robben Ford (electric guitar).

F-Zero was rereleased for the Virtual Console service on the Wii in late 2006, on the Wii U in February 2013, (Note: The game was available through the Wii U Virtual Console trial campaign in February 2013 before the Virtual Console's formal launch in April.) and the New Nintendo 3DS in March 2016. Nintendo rereleased F-Zero in September 2017 as part of the Super NES Classic Edition. It was also included as one of the initial 20 SNES games for the Nintendo Classics service in September 2019.

== Reception ==
Reception

Aggregate score
Aggregator	Score
GameRankings	83% (SNES & Wii)

Review scores
Publication	Score
ACE	840/1000 (SNES)
Computer and Video Games	90% (SNES)
Famitsu	7/10, 8/10, 8/10, 9/10 (SNES); 10/10, 8/10, 9/10, 10/10
GameSpot	8/10 (Wii)
GameZone	5/5 (SNES)
IGN	7.5/10 (SNES); 7.5/10 (Wii)
Mean Machines	90%
Super Play	81% (SNES)
Total!	91% (SNES)
Entertainment Weekly	A− (SNES)
Hippon Super!	10/10 (SNES)
Play Time	55% (SNES)
The Virginian-Pilot	A (SNES)

F-Zero was widely lauded by game critics for its graphical realism, and has been called the fastest and most fluid pseudo-3D racing game of its time for home systems. This has been mostly credited to the development team's pervasive use of the "Mode 7" system. Eurogamer's Tom Bramwell commented "this abundance of Mode 7 was unheard of" for the SNES. This graphics-rendering technique was an innovative technological achievement at the time that made racing games more realistic, the first of which was F-Zero. Jeremy Parish of Electronic Gaming Monthly wrote that the use of Mode 7 created the "most convincing racetracks that had ever been seen on a home console" that gave "console gamers an experience even more visceral than could be found in the arcades." 1UP.com editor Ravi Hiranand agreed, arguing F-Zero's combination of fast-paced racing and free-range of motion were superior compared to previous home console games. IGN's Peer Schneider wrote that F-Zero was one of the few 16-bit games to "perfectly combine presentation and functionality to create a completely new gaming experience".

F-Zero was praised for its variety of tracks, and steady increase in difficulty. GameSpy's Jason D'Aprile thought it "was something of a finesse racer. It took lots of practice, good memorization skills, and a rather fine sense of control." Matt Taylor of The Virginian-Pilot said it was more about "reflexes than realism", and it lacked the ability to save progress between races. The soundtrack was lauded.

In GameSpot's retrospective review by Greg Kasavin, he praised F-Zero's controls, longevity and track design. Kasavin felt it offered exceptional gameplay, with "a perfect balance of pick-up-and-play accessibility and sheer depth". Retrospective reviews agreed that the game should have used a multiplayer mode. IGN's Lucas Thomas criticized the lack of a substantial plot and mentioned F-Zero "doesn't have the same impact these days" suggesting "the sequels on GBA very much pick up where this title left off". In 2009, Official Nintendo Magazine called it "blisteringly fast, seriously challenging and insanely fun" and named it the 66th-greatest Nintendo game.

=== Legacy ===
F-Zero is credited for setting a standard for the racing genre and inventing the "futuristic racing" subgenre. IGN credits it for having inspired the future creation of numerous racing games inside and out of the futuristic subgenre, including the Wipeout series and Daytona USA. Toshihiro Nagoshi, President of Sega's Amusement Vision, stated in 2002 that F-Zero "actually taught me what a game should be" and that it served as an influence for him to create Daytona USA and other racing games. Amusement Vision collaborated with Nintendo to develop F-Zero GX and AX, with Nagoshi serving as one of the co-producers for these games.

F-Zero has continued to be included in lists of the best SNES games. In 1995, Total! rated it 50th on their Top 100 SNES Games summarizing: "It's old and basic but this garish futuristic offering still pushes your driving skills to the limit. In 1997 Electronic Gaming Monthly ranked it the 18th best console video game of all time, citing its tight controls, the different handling characteristics of the four craft, and the competitive opponent AI. IGN ranked F-Zero as the 91st best game ever in 2003, discussing its originality at time of release and as the 97th best game ever in 2005, describing it as still "respected as one of the all-time top racers". ScrewAttack placed it as the 18th best SNES game. In 2018, Complex listed F-Zero 31st on its "The Best Super Nintendo Games of All Time."

Nintendo initially developed an F-Zero sequel for the SNES, although it was broadcast in several versions on the St.GIGA subscription service for the Satellaview attachment of the Super Famicom instead. Using this add-on, players could download games via satellite and save it onto a flash ROM cartridge for temporary play. The sequel was released under the Japanese names of BS F-Zero Grand Prix and BS F-Zero Grand Prix 2 during the mid-1990s. (Note: IGN refers to BS F-Zero Grand Prix as the planned sequel and BS F-Zero Grand Prix 2 as a "special edition" or "semi-sequel" to the original game. Computer and Video Games mentions the planned sequel to F-Zero was split into these two games.) BS F-Zero Grand Prix contained a new track and four different playable vehicles. According to Nintendo Power, the game was under consideration for a North American release via Game Pak. BS F-Zero Grand Prix 2 features one new league containing five tracks, a Grand Prix and a Practice mode. The 1992 SNES game Super Mario Kart began as a multiplayer F-Zero prototype.

F-Zero made the transition to 3D graphics with the release of F-Zero X on the Nintendo 64 in 1998. Mode 7-style effects continued to be used for the Game Boy Advance (GBA) games Maximum Velocity (2001), GP Legend (2003), and Climax (2004). Maximum Velocity was described by GameSpy as a hard overhaul of F-Zero and featured improvements to its graphical effects. Climax features expanded backgrounds, improved track detail, and a more distinguishable separation between the course and ground below. In 2023, Nintendo released a free online game, F-Zero 99 (2023) through the Nintendo Switch Online (NSO) subscription service. In a similar vein to the NSO exclusives like Tetris 99 and Pac-Man 99, the game reuses graphical aesthetics and gameplay from the original F-Zero, and recontextualizes it as a battle royale — players choose the same vehicles and tracks from the 1990 game.
