= F-Zero: GP Legend =

2004 racing video game

- North American cover art
- Developer: Suzak Inc.
- Publisher: Nintendo
- Directors: Yutaka Hirata; Azusa Tajima
- Producer: Hitoshi Yamagami
- Writers: Yutaka Hirata; Nobuhiro Kuronuma
- Composer: Kenji Hikita
- Series: F-Zero
- Platform: Game Boy Advance
- Release: JP: November 28, 2003; EU: June 4, 2004; NA: September 20, 2004
- Genre: Racing
- Modes: Single-player, multiplayer

F-Zero: GP Legend (Note: Known in Japan as F-Zero Falcon Densetsu (Japanese: F-ZEROファルコン伝説, Hepburn: Efu Zero Farukon Densetsu; lit. F-ZERO: Legend of Falcon)) is a 2003 racing video game developed by Suzak Inc. and published by Nintendo for the Game Boy Advance. It was released in Japan in 2003 and in Europe and North America in 2004.

The video game is based on the anime of the same name. A sequel was released in 2004 exclusively in Japan, titled F-Zero Climax.

== Gameplay ==
F-Zero GP Legend is a racing game that plays similar to the original Super NES version of F-Zero and uses features from F-Zero X on the Nintendo 64. The game uses a new Mode 7 effect designed for the Game Boy Advance to allow the background layers to rotate and scale to display the course.

Players take control of their vehicles known as machines by pressing A to accelerate, B to use brakes, left and right to the corresponding direction on the D-pad, and the L and R shoulder buttons to drift to the corresponding direction. Players can attack other racers using Side attacks by pressing the L or R buttons twice depending on whether the opponent is on the left or right side. Players can perform a boost ability on the second lap of races by simultaneously pressing L and R buttons. Other methods of gaining a boost is by releasing and pressing the A button in quick succession and holding the A button for a specific amount of time during a race's countdown.

Race tracks contain obstacles and supporting features such as Jump plates, Dash plates, Rumble Strips, and Mine Fields. The Jump Plate allows the Machine to jump upward and may cause fall damage to the player's machine. To avoid damage, players can press the down directional button on the D-pad to move the machine's nose upward as the machine descends and make the jump last longer.

=== Game modes ===
- Grand Prix: players race through a series of tracks in the Bronze, Silver, Gold, and Platinum cups. Each cup consists of five tracks. In each race, players are scored by their finishing position. The points are added up after each race, and the pilot with the most points wins. If players' machine is destroyed, they have the choice to use a spare machine and redo the race or quit the cup. Three difficulty settings can be selected: Novice, Standard, and Expert.
- Story: players engage in a series of missions that describe the story of the game. Rick Wheeler's story is the only option at first but more character stories get unlocked. Each pilot has five missions to complete, where players are required to either win a race, defeat a specific opponent in a race, destroy one or more target opponents, never be passed by one or two enemies, assist an ally in winning the race, help an ally defeat a specific opponent, chase an enemy, or reach a destination before the timer runs out. Finishing a mission will reward the pilot with an amount of money depending on how well the players did on that mission. Two missions can cost the pilot some money if he has enough to pay (one is to pay an entry fee for a race the pilot really wants to enter, and the other is to pay for parts and labor needed to repair a different pilot's stalled machine).
- Time Attack: players race through five laps on a single track to try to beat the best time possible on tracks that have been unlocked in Grand Prix mode. Players can play alone or against a ghost racer. A scoreboard of the top five best times for each track is displayed on the track selection screen, along with the best time for a single lap. After getting the best time, players can choose to save their ghost to race against later, though only one ghost can be saved at a time. The only tracks that can be selected are those from the Grand Prix mode, provided they have been completed in Grand Prix mode. A special course called Mute City - Championship can be unlocked and played in this mode after unlocking all the Grand Prix courses.
- Training: Allows players to race around a track of their choice to practice and can customize the number of laps, the number of opponents, and the level of difficulty. All the tracks that can be played in Time Attack mode can be selected in Training mode.
- Zero Test: Challenges players to reach the end of a specific portion of a track within the allocated time. The challenges are divided into four classes: C, B, A, and S. Each class features 12 different tests. The classes are unlocked in sequence, so each class player completes unlocks the succeeding class. Times are rated using bronze, silver, and gold.
- Link: The player races against up to four other human opponents via Game Boy Link Cable. There are two different modes, Single-Pak and Multi-Pak. Single-Pak only requires one person to have a copy of the game, but each player uses a different colored Dragon Bird and can only play on one course, Big Blue - Calm Sea. The main background music is also disabled. This is the only mode in which Big Blue - Calm Sea can be played. The multi-Pak mode has no restrictions and allows any course from the Grand Prix to be picked and any machine that has been unlocked. If playing a two or three-player game, the players choose their machines and the difficulty level to race against.

=== e-Reader support ===
The Japanese version of F-Zero:GP Legend is supported e-Reader. Once the e+ cards are scanned in, it would create a program to send data to the game via Game Boy Advance link cable which would unlock additional content. There are four types of e-cards for cards: Machine, Course, Challenge, and Characters. Machine cards allow users to unlock a pilot/machine. Scanning one strip would transfer data about the pilot while scanning the other strip would transfer data about the machine. In order to use the machine, both the pilot and machine data have to be transferred to the game. Course cards unlock a new course. In order to transfer the course, both strips on each side of the card must be scanned. After the data has been transferred, it will be given the option to save the course. The game has been designed to allow up to five courses to be saved. Challenge Cards unlock a challenge to race against a ghost made by Nintendo staff and require a total of both sides of a set of four cards to unlock the challenge. Character cards are not compatible with the e-reader and contain information about the character from the anime and their machine.

For the Nintendo Classics, rerelease, e-Reader courses and challenge ghosts are not available in US and EU versions, although they are included in the Japanese version.

== Promotion and release ==
To promote the game, an event dedicated to the F-Zero was held on November 8, 2003, at Joypolis amusement park where attendants could play the pre-release version of the game. F-Zero: GP Legend was released in Japan on November 28, 2003. Supplementary e+ card packs were released in two varieties. The "Pillow Pack" includes one Machine, two Course cards, and two Challenge cards. The "Carddass Pack" came with two e+ cards and a Character card and was made available via Bandai's card vending machines. This feature was not available in the North American and European versions of the game. Nintendo re-released the game in Japan on the Wii U's Virtual Console, and on the Nintendo Classics service.

== Reception ==
Reception

Aggregate score
Aggregator	Score
Metacritic	77/100

Review scores
Publication	Score
1Up.com	C
Edge	5/10
Eurogamer	8/10
Famitsu	29/40
Game Informer	6.5/10
GameSpot	8/10
GameSpy	3/5
GameZone	8/10
IGN	8/10
Nintendo Life	8/10
Nintendo Power	3.8/5
Nintendo World Report	9/10
X-Play	4/5

The game received "generally favorable reviews" according to the review aggregator Metacritic. Eurogamer's Tom Bramwell gave praise to the variety added to the game through the implementation of a number of game modes, in particular the Story mode for being challenging. GameSpot reviewer, Avery Score, complimented the new story mode in the game. Computer and Video Games staff found it entertaining that the story mode was restricted to one character and progressively unlocked more as one continued to play it. Doug Buel from The Tampa Tribune stated F-Zero: GP Legend's effort to unite Nintendo's racing franchise with Japanese animation "works pretty well", but highlighted the game's inability to show all of the racers on the screen at once as its worst feature. Buel also thought controlling the vehicles had "complete consistency" when attempting to lean, slide, and power boost. In contrast, Jeremy Parish of 1Up.com found the story mode incomprehensible. In Japan, Famitsu gave it a score of three sevens and one eight for a total of 29 out of 40. Iron Monkey of GamePro said, "Damn fast, damn challenging, and thoroughly addictive, F-Zero: GP Legend dominates the handheld circuit." (Note: GamePro gave the game 3.5/5 for graphics, 4/5 for sound, and two 4.5/5 scores for control and fun factor.)
