= Hard-Hat Domo =

2009 video game

- Developer(s): Suzak Inc.
- Publisher(s): Nintendo
- Platform(s): Nintendo DSi (DSiWare)
- Release: NA: October 19, 2009
- Genre(s): Puzzle
- Mode(s): Single-player, multiplayer

Hard-Hat Domo is a DSiWare game that you use Domo as a construction worker to get to the top of a 100-floor building. It was made by Suzak. The game's goal is to match the ladder colors to the floor colors to get points. Sometimes, it is impossible to match both colors, but the game allows players to place a ladder as long as the ladder color and the color of the floor beneath him match. A level is cleared upon reaching the top floor. There is a timer that shows how many seconds until Wall Construction begins. Time is added to the timer when a ladder is placed. If the timer runs out, Wall Construction begins. If the Wall Construction catches up to Domo's current floor, he will lose one meat-and-potato stew bowl. If Domo loses all of his bowls, the game ends.

== Release ==
Hard-Hat Domo was released in North America as a DSiWare on October 19, 2009.

== Reception ==
Reception

Review scores
Publication	Score
IGN	4/10
Nintendo Life	4/10

Nintendo Life's Philip J Reed criticized the game's repetitive gameplay and stiff controls.
