= Zero Racers =

2026 video game completed in 1996

- Title screen
- Developer: Nintendo R&D1
- Publisher: Nintendo
- Director: Kazunobu Shimizu
- Producer: Gunpei Yokoi
- Programmers: Hikonori Suzuki; Kouichi Kawashima
- Artists: Eiko Takahashi; Reiko Kajigaya
- Composers: Ryoji Yoshitomi; Kozue Ishikawa
- Series: F-Zero
- Platform: Virtual Boy (Note: Zero Racers is programmed for the Virtual Boy. It never received a physical release, but was released on the Nintendo Classics Virtual Boy emulator for the Nintendo Switch and Nintendo Switch 2.)
- Release: August 4, 2026
- Genre: Racing
- Mode: Single-player

Zero Racers is a racing game developed by Nintendo for the Virtual Boy. It is a spin-off of the F-Zero series. Players choose one of four characters and race in hovercars against AI-controlled characters in fifteen tracks divided into three leagues.

Zero Racers was to be the first F-Zero game to feature 3D graphics. It was completed and planned for release in 1996, but was canceled following the failure of the Virtual Boy. It was released through the Nintendo Classics download service on August 4, 2026.

== Gameplay ==
Gameplay screenshot. Virtual Boy games use a red-and-black color scheme.

Zero Racers is a futuristic racing game in which players compete in a high-speed racing tournament. Like in F-Zero (1990), Zero Racers features four available vehicles, each with differing stats & performances.

The objective is to finish the race against other vehicles while avoiding course hazards that damage the player's vehicle. Machines have a power meter which serves as their durability; decreasing on collisions with the track or other vehicles occur. Energy is replenished by driving over pit areas placed along the home straight. Unlike the original F-Zero, the vehicles race in 3D tunnels. Game Informer likened it to the Death Star run from the 1977 film Star Wars.

Races consist of five laps, each lap requiring to finish in higher rank positions to stay in the race. Tracks can have a limited number of "Rapid Marks" that players can collect up to three to use as temporary speed boosts. Tracks may feature jet zones which give a single speed boost or gravity zones that shift machines in a set direction. Tracks can turn or narrow horizontally or vertically, requiring to anticipate them and time vehicle turning to avoid track collisions, speed loss and rank position.

In Grand Prix mode, players enter a league to race against other vehicles over five courses. Each lap completed earns points determined by rank position, with every 10,000 points earning an "extra machine" to retry the course if the player crashes or ranks out. The player chooses one of three leagues, for a total of fifteen courses.

In Practice mode, players race on any of the fifteen Grand Prix courses with the options to race against a rival machine and backmarker obstacles. In Time Trial mode, the player races on a unique course with no pit areas to recover any damage sustained.

== History and release ==
Zero Racers was developed and published by Nintendo. It was co-produced by Gunpei Yokoi and its executive producer, Hiroshi Yamauchi. Kazunobu Shimizu was a director, and was co-programmed by Hikonori Suzuki and Kouichi Kawashima. It was graphic designed by Eiko Takahashi and Reiko Kajigaya, while the music was composed by Ryoji Yoshitomi and Kozue Ishikawa.

It was revealed in a preview by Nintendo Power in their July 1996 issue under the name G-Zero, and planned for a late 1996 launch. Nintendo Power published an in-depth article in its August issue under the name Zero Racers. It was also previewed later in September 1996 issue of the British magazine Nintendo Magazine System. And in October 1996 issue of the Mexican magazine, Club Nintendo. False reports suggested it had been displayed at E3 1996.

After the commercial failure of the Virtual Boy, Nintendo canceled the Zero Racers release. Some speculated that it had never left early development and that the screenshots were mockups. However, according to the former Nintendo of America localizer and associate producer Jim Wornell, it was complete and had a manual, package, label, and ESRB rating. In January 2026, Nintendo announced Zero Racers would be released on the Nintendo Classics download service. It was released on August 4, alongside another previously unreleased Virtual Boy game, Dragon Hopper.

== Reception ==
Reception

Review score
Publication	Score
Nintendo Life	8/10

In 1998, Electronic Gaming Monthly wrote of their disappointment at Zero Racers' cancellation, saying it might have been "one of the few VB games actually worth checking out". After its release, Nile Bowie of Nintendo Life said Zero Racers was the most enjoyable Virtual Boy game he had played, and suggested it could have been the Virtual Boy "killer app" had Nintendo released it in 1996. He praised the integration of the F-Zero gameplay into the Virtual Boy's stereoscopic display, saying the sparse presentation served the sense of momentum and created the sense of "playing inside the targeting display of an '80s science-fiction cockpit".

=== Legacy ===
The title music was reused in a 1998 promotional demo for the Game Boy Color.
