= F-Zero Climax =

2004 video game

- Developer: Suzak
- Publisher: Nintendo
- Directors: Yukata Hirata; Azusa Tajima
- Producer: Hitoshi Yamagami
- Composer: Kenji Hikita
- Series: F-Zero
- Platform: Game Boy Advance
- Release: JP: October 21, 2004
- Genre: Racing
- Modes: Single-player, multiplayer

F-Zero Climax (Note: Japanese: エフゼロ クライマックス, Hepburn: Efu-zero Kuraimakkusu) is a racing video game developed by Suzak Inc. and published by Nintendo for the Game Boy Advance (GBA) handheld console. The game was released in Japan on October 21, 2004, and marked the final F-Zero installment for 19 years until the 2023 release of F-Zero 99.

Players race in vehicles on numerous courses while navigating past obstacles. While the game is a 2D racer, its Mode 7-styled graphical effect allows the track to be scaled and rotated around the vehicle to simulate a 3D environment. Climax let players store rewarded speed boosts to use with energy-draining speed boosts. Energy is a reflection of the craft's health, and can be restored by driving over specific areas on the track.

Nintendo World Report and Siliconera lauded the game for its track editor and Survival mode. Nintendo World Report praised the game's extensive Survival and Zero Test challenges, but complained about the Grand Prix's short duration and unbalanced difficulty. While Nintendo World Report and Official Nintendo Magazine thought it was a graphical improvement over preceding 2D F-Zero games, both the former critic and Siliconera lamented over its reused graphics and musical assets.

== Gameplay ==
Screenshot of F-Zero Climax, showing the player's head-up display and racing craft. Matthew Castle of Official Nintendo Magazine called it "easily the best-looking of the SNES-type [F-Zero] games".

F-Zero Climax is a racing game that plays similarly to its immediate predecessor (F-Zero: GP Legend) and the original F-Zero game. Players select their vehicles and race around fifty-three courses while avoiding obstacles such as ice and bombs. Each racing craft contains air brakes for drifting around tight corners by pressing the L and R shoulder buttons. A vehicle's health and ability to speed boost after the first lap is measured by an energy meter. Boosting in this manner briefly increases the racer's speed while draining their energy. The player is also rewarded with a stored speed boost for each lap completed. However, this may only be used in tandem with the energy-draining boost resulting in a double speed boost. Vehicles can drive over pink plates scattered throughout the track to replenish energy. Players can damage competitors with two attacks: a spin attack that quickly rotates the entire vehicle, or a side attack. The former is new to the 2D F-Zero series. Players can also spin attack during a speed boost to inflict extra damage. The game offers four control scheme presets, and personalized button configurations.

Climax has numerous gameplay modes and options, some of which were carried over from GP Legend. In the Grand Prix mode, the player races against twenty-three opponents through three laps of each track in a cup. Each of the four cups available (Bronze, Silver, Gold, and Platinum) has multiple difficulty levels. Track selection per cup may vary based on difficulty level chosen. Time attack let players choose any track to complete it in the shortest time possible. Zero Test is a selectable option in Time Attack where players may compete in thirty-six time trials on a small section of track. Survival consists of mission-based objectives such as navigating courses with depleted health, and racing an opponent on a short guardrail-less track without flying off-course at the finish line by braking. Completing a series of survival challenges unlocks a character biography with a brief episode summary from the TV Tokyo anime series F-Zero: GP Legend. The multiplayer mode is where two to four players can compete simultaneously.

Edit mode allows the creation of tracks. Players can lay track pieces that come in an assortment of sizes and shapes. Each piece has a list of obstacles available. Track pieces are valued at varying points, for example, larger pieces are worth more points. A track may have up to 255 points. Players can participate in races on them, or setup camera angles to spectate artificial intelligence (AI)-controlled racers. Custom tracks can be saved to one of thirty slots for future use and shared with other players via Game Link Cable. The game can also generate a track-specific password that can be inputted on any Climax cartridge for conversion back to the custom track.

== Promotion and release ==
Information on F-Zero Climax's existence and title was leaked by Japanese retailers weeks before its official announcement by Nintendo. The game was developed by Suzak and published by Nintendo for the GBA handheld console. Yukata Hirata and Azusa Tajima served as directors, Hitoshi Yamagami as producer, and Kenji Hikita as composer. Climax continues to use the Mode 7-like graphical effect seen in previous GBA F-Zero games. Mode 7 allows the track to be scaled and rotated around the vehicle to simulate a 3D environment. It was originally used as a showcase feature for the Super NES F-Zero game. Like GP Legend before it, Climax is tied into the TV Tokyo anime series. It was originally released exclusively in Japan on October 21, 2004, and sold 5,049 copies during its first three days on sale. The game was re-released on the Japanese Wii U Virtual Console on December 16, 2015. On October 30, 2021, an English fan translation patch was released. The game received its first re-release outside of Japan via the Nintendo Classics service on October 11, 2024.

== Reception ==
Nintendo World Report's Daniel Bloodworth thought the Grand Prix mode, which should be the focus of the game, is "woefully lacking". Bloodworth criticized track length of the first 3 cups; he clocked-in at 20–30 seconds per lap and finished three cups within 20 minutes on standard difficulty. He concluded "combined with the low difficulty and re-used environments and music, it all ends up feeling rather unsatisfying." While the fourth cup is more difficult, Bloodworth was taken back by its sudden spike in difficulty—even when playing every cup on Expert or Master. Also, many of its courses were rehashes from the first F-Zero game and GP Legend. During Siliconera's playtest, they praised Climax's track design and varying levels of difficulty between courses—easier courses are relatively straight compared to later ones which require honed drifting skill. They mentioned the game demanded players to have quick reflexes and master the track layout on difficulties beyond novice since the AI-controlled opponents are unforgiving. Siliconera noted players have to be proficient at both types of speed boosting. Bloodworth explained a properly timed double speed boost can substantially alter the momentum of a race. Compared to GP Legend's controls, Siliconera thought the spin attack "is a neat trick to use, that adds a new element to the game." Bloodworth liked the personalized button configurations, especially since vehicles feel stiffer and the game does not allow players to adjust a vehicle's balance between maximum acceleration and maximum top speed.

Bloodworth said Climax is "probably the most polished of the 2D iterations of this franchise." The game features expanded backgrounds, improved track detail, and a more distinguishable separation between the course and ground below. Siliconera thought Climax could've looked better, but the game "reuses many of the tile sets from GP Legend and Maximum Velocity." Furthermore, Bloodworth was disappointed with the music tracks being mostly rehashes from the original game and F-Zero X—a sentiment Siliconera agreed with. The voice work of the announcer fell short to Bloodworth. He explained the announcer is sometimes helpful, but also report events inappropriately or too frequently.

Siliconera criticized Climax for feeling more like an expansion pack than a sequel. They compared the game's Survival mode to GP Legend's story mode and consider it not as deep, "but the challenges are much tougher." Siliconera thought the track editor and its ability to be shared with other players as the game's greatest feature. Bloodworth concluded Climax has plenty of Survival and Zero Test challenges, and slots to save created courses, but the lackluster Grand Prix holds the game back. Nintendo World Report and Siliconera felt that the game was a likely candidate for localization in regions outside Japan due to GP: Legend's recent nondomestic release, but this never happened. F-Zero: GP Legend was released in Japan in late 2003, but the US version was delayed into late 2004 to coincide with the anime's release. Climax was the third F-Zero game on the GBA and the final release in the franchise before its 19-year hiatus, which ended with the 2023 release of F-Zero 99.
