= GameChat =

Communication application by Nintendo

- A GameChat chat room showcasing the simultaneous screen-sharing capabilities
- Developer: Nintendo
- Release: June 5, 2025; 13 months ago
- Platform: Nintendo Switch 2
- Predecessor: Nintendo Switch App voice chat feature
- Type: VoIP, screen sharing, video chat

GameChat (Note: Japanese: ゲームチャット, Hepburn: Gēmuchatto; Nintendo branded the application in Japan in its English name.) is a voice and video communication application developed by Nintendo for the Nintendo Switch 2 video game system. It is the successor to the voice chat feature on the Nintendo Switch Mobile App that is intended for the Nintendo Switch. Launched on June 5, 2025, alongside the Nintendo Switch 2, it serves as the primary social communication application for Nintendo Switch Online subscribers. GameChat received mostly positive reception, with critics comparing the application as a family-friendly alternative to Discord.

== Overview ==
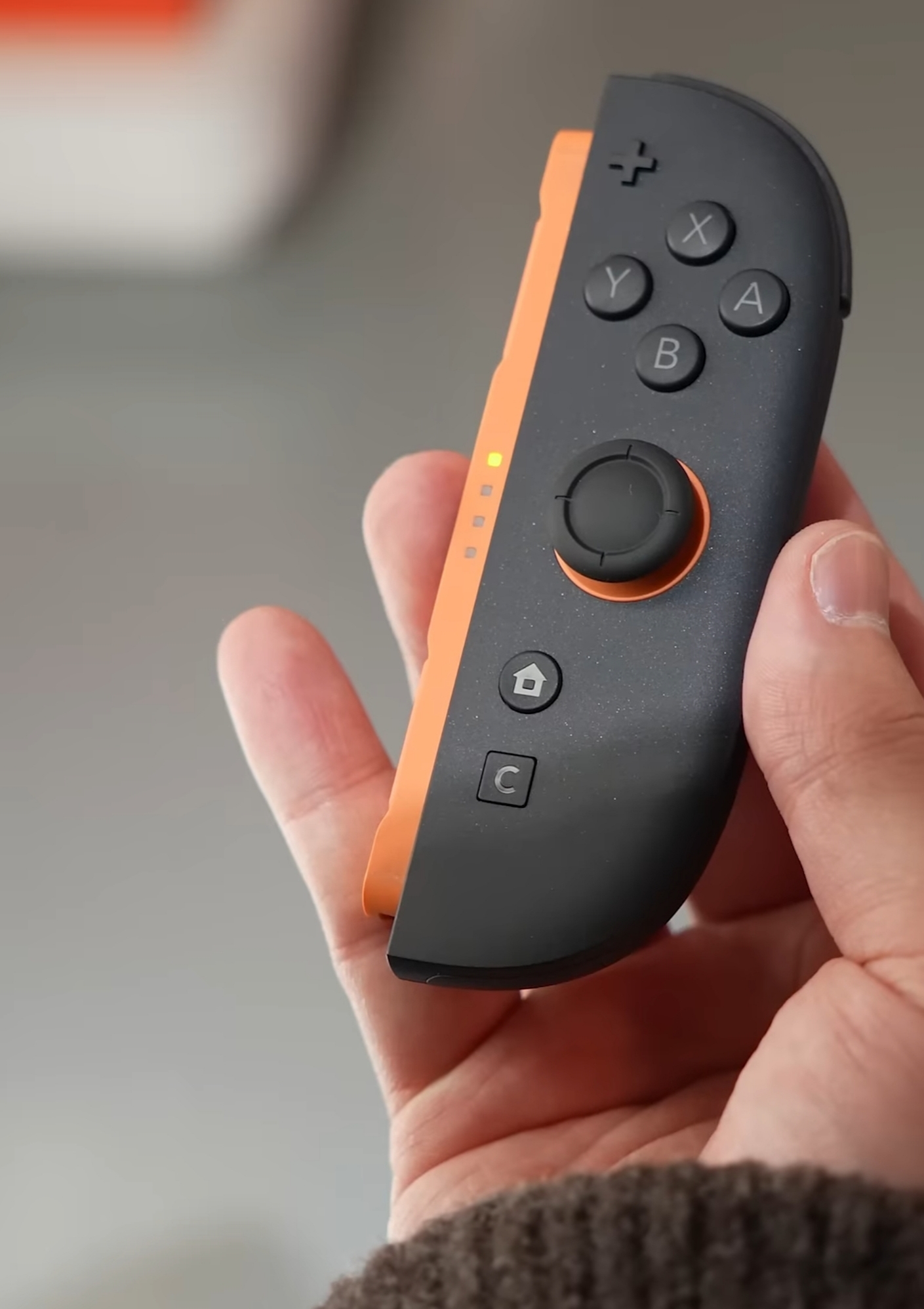
GameChat can be launched at any time by pressing the "C" button on controllers like the right Joy-Con 2 controller.

GameChat is a voice chat application that is part of the Nintendo Switch 2 system software. The application can be launched from the HOME Menu or at any time by pressing the "C" button on supported controllers, such as the right Joy-Con 2. Prior to March 31, 2026, GameChat was available for free for users with a Nintendo Account as part of the GameChat Open-Access Period. After that date, the service requires an active Nintendo Switch Online subscription.

Before using GameChat, users must go through text message verification with the phone number that is registered to their Nintendo Account. A console that has users under the age of 16 requires parental controls to be set up on the console via the Nintendo Switch Parental Controls app. Parents then are able to control what GameChat features children can use, including viewing interaction history and grant approval for camera access.

=== Features ===
- Voice chat: Up to 12 players can join one chat room and use voice chat to communicate with others in the chat room. GameChat has a noise filtering feature to filter out unwanted sounds, allowing users' voices to be heard clearly.
- Video chat: GameChat allows for video chat using a supported webcam, like the Nintendo Switch 2 Camera. Capture cards can also be used in place of a camera, allowing users to connect other devices such as supported Android and iPhone devices. Users can also set video chat backgrounds. During a GameChat session, CameraPlay can be used, allowing users to interact with select games with the camera during a game session.
- Screen sharing: Up to 4 players can share their screen simultaneously to others in the chat room, even if they are playing different games. Not all games and applications support screen sharing, as support is determined by the games' developer.
- GameShare over GameChat: GameChat allows users to share supported games via GameShare inside the chat room to play together online, even when users don't own a copy of the game. GameShare has been compared to DS Download Play.

==== Accessibility features ====
- Text-to-speech: Users can type their message on the keyboard and the system can read it out inside the chat room using text-to-speech.
- Speech-to-text: The voice chat can be transcribed to text by the system to produce a chat transcript.

== Development and release ==
Development of the Nintendo Switch 2 console ramped up in around 2019, where early focus was on improving the consoles' software performance through tech upgrades. However, the emergence of the COVID-19 pandemic in 2020 interfered with the development of the console, as it forced Nintendo developers to work at home during the lockdowns and shutdowns. To communicate among developers, they used video conferencing systems to check the software that is being worked among the team. However, Nintendo developers expressed frustrations with the software, particularly the limitation of only being able to use screen sharing once at the time, so much so that developers have to have "each person place their game screen in front of their camera instead of their faces." Developers enjoyed the idea, as Switch 2 lead producer Kawamoto said that it felt like they were "in the same place, each bringing our own console to play the game together," influencing the idea of GameChat. It was later pitched to Nintendo executives as one of the standout features of the console, comparing it to development of Super NES and Nintendo 64 games.

The first demo for GameChat was created in just under six months on a standard Nintendo Switch console with a faster CPU and more RAM, as the Switch 2 wasn't ready back then. Nintendo developers wanted GameChat to feel like a student lounge atmosphere, whey they can gather and mingle around together regardless of what they are playing, creating a new voice chat atmosphere. The Nintendo Switch 2 Camera was later added to the proposal with the atmosphere in mind. When testing the GameChat demo with various existing games, developers felt like that in some games, including single-player ones such as The Legend of Zelda: Breath of the Wild, some developers felt like playing an online game, even though it is not one. The screen sharing feature was implemented as a way to help players show game tips to other players. Nintendo developers pressured the hardware team to design the Switch 2 with the GameChat ideas in mind for seamless setup and use, such as adding the microphone with built-in chips that have the ability to process sounds, noise filtering, and capabilities for smooth livestreaming. To make GameChat easier to launch, developers suggested the idea of adding a "C" button to the controller to easily launch GameChat without much effort. Developers also included privacy and safety features such as the camera shutter and the ability for parents to monitor children's GameChat activity using the Nintendo Switch Parental Controls app.

GameChat was announced in the Nintendo Switch 2's introductory Nintendo Direct on April 2, 2025. showcasing the features of the application, the "C" button, and the interactive CameraPlay features in games such as Mario Kart World and Super Mario Party Jamboree - Nintendo Switch 2 Edition + Jamboree TV. GameChat was released on June 5, 2025, alongside the Switch 2 through a day-one software update. Nintendo made GameChat free until March 31, 2026, as part of the GameChat Open-Access Period, when it later requires a Nintendo Switch Online subscription after that date.

== Reception ==
GameChat received generally favorable reviews from critics. Wired described GameChat as "the most notable, wholly new feature" of the Switch 2. Many critics compared GameChat to the likes of Discord and Zoom, with many calling it more of a family friendly alternative. Many reviewers praised the ease of use, such as Mashable, calling the inclusion of the "C" button useful, making it "very easy to bop in and out of chat rooms" without needing to return to the HOME Menu. Business Insider felt it was "made for quick, casual multiplayer sessions" rather than specialist communication. Gizmodo described the CameraPlay features in GameChat chaotic, such as allowing users to see players' expressions when getting hit by a blue shell in Mario Kart, calling it "priceless, especially since you no longer have to look away from the screen to witness their agony." Many critics praised the accuracy of the speech-to-text option and its ability to discern specific speakers.

Some criticism of GameChat was about requiring a Nintendo Switch Online subscription, leading to the perception of the "C" button locked behind a paywall, though it is remappable. The screen sharing capabilities was criticized for low framerates and large amounts of compression, with The Verge calling it "choppy and hard to follow."

== See also ==
- Online video game networks with voice chat functionality
  - Xbox network
  - PlayStation Network
  - Steam
- Wii U Chat
