= Hiro-x =

Japanese singer

Hiro-X
- Born: Hiromitsu Aoki (青木 裕光); December 26, 1980 (age 45); Shizuoka (city), Japan
- Occupation: Singer
- Website: http://www.hiromitsu-aoki.com/

Hiromitsu Aoki (青木 裕光, Aoki Hiromitsu; born December 26, 1980) in Shizuoka (city), popularly known by his stage name, Hiro X (stylized as HIRO-X), is a Japanese singer and modern J-pop artist. His most well known works include the opening themes for the first two seasons of the anime The Prince of Tennis, "Future" and "Driving Myself", and the opening theme song for the first season of the anime F-Zero Falcon Densetsu, "The Meaning of Truth", released in 2003.

== Career ==
However, he has since quit being a solo singer and works now in two groups, leading fans to believe he had retired from the musical scenario. He now sings as Hiromitsu-Aoki in Shandy Scope (stylized as SHANDY SCOPE) and Akashic Note (stylized as akashic note), both groups being part of the contemporary Japanese indie culture.

== Discography ==
- "Future" (December 5, 2001)
- "Driving Myself" (May 1, 2002)
- "The Meaning of Truth" (December 3, 2003), composed and arranged by Takashi Nakayama
- "Calling" (October 5, 2005)
- "future -reboot version-" (December 7, 2011)
