= F-Zero GX =

2003 video game

- North American box art
- Developer: Amusement Vision
- Publisher: Nintendo
- Producers: Toshihiro Nagoshi; Shigeru Miyamoto
- Composers: Hidenori Shoji; Daiki Kasho
- Series: F-Zero
- Platform: GameCube
- Release: JP: July 25, 2003; NA: August 25, 2003; AU: October 24, 2003; EU: October 31, 2003
- Genre: Racing
- Modes: Single-player, multiplayer

F-Zero GX is a 2003 racing game developed by Amusement Vision, a division of Sega, and published by Nintendo for the GameCube. It was released in Japan on July 25, 2003, North America on August 25, Australia on October 24, and Europe on October 31. Sega also released an arcade version, F-Zero AX, which uses the Triforce arcade system board.

F-Zero GX retains the high-speed gameplay of the previous F-Zero games, with an emphasis on track memorization and reflexes. It introduces a "story mode", in which the player completes missions as Captain Falcon through nine chapters.

The project was the first significant game collaboration between Nintendo and Sega. It runs on an enhanced version of the game engine used in Super Monkey Ball (2001). GX received positive reviews for its visuals, intense action, sense of speed, and track design, though its difficulty was criticized. In 2025, it was rereleased on the Nintendo Classics service for the Nintendo Switch 2.

== Gameplay ==
F-Zero GX is a futuristic racing game in which up to thirty competitors race in an intergalactic Grand Prix. It retains the basic gameplay and control of the previous F-Zero game, F-Zero X (1998) on the Nintendo 64. Tracks include enclosed tubes, cylinders, jumps, and rollercoaster-like paths. Some include obstacles such as dirt patches and mines. An emphasis is placed on track memorization and reflexes.

Each machine handles differently, has its own performance abilities affected by its weight, and a grip, boost, and durability score. Before each race, the player can adjust a vehicle's balance between acceleration and top speed. Every machine has an energy meter, a measurement of its health, which is lost through collisions or attacks from opposing racers. Energy is also used to boost, which becomes possible after the first lap. Energy is recovered by driving over pit areas. Dash plates provide a speed boost, while jump plates launch vehicles into the air, enabling them to cut corners.

Corners are navigated using the analog stick and shoulder buttons. By holding both shoulder buttons, vehicles can drift around corners. Afterwards, the physics modeling gives vehicles setup with high acceleration a boost of acceleration. Players can exploit this on a wide straight stretch of a circuit to generate serpentinous movements. This technique, called "snaking", delivers a massive increase in speed, but it is best used on the easier tracks, when racing alone in Time Trial, and with heavy vehicles with a high grip rating and given high acceleration. Nintendo said snaking was an intentional inclusion, but IGN said this may be "damage control".

Screenshot showing the head-up display and racing craft. The game features widescreen and progressive scan support.

In the Grand Prix mode, the player races against twenty-nine opponents through three laps of each track in a cup. Racers receive points for finishing a track depending on their finishing position; the racer with the most points at the end of the cup is the winner. Initially, the player has access to three cups: Ruby, Sapphire and Emerald. Completing all three unlocks the Diamond Cup. Each cup has four difficulty levels: novice, standard, expert, and master. Completing all four cups on the highest difficulty level unlocks tracks from F-Zero AX.

If the player has a "spare machine"—the equivalent of an extra life— the race can be restarted even if their vehicle is destroyed. Players start each cup with more vehicles on lower difficulty levels. Players receive energy for destroying competitors through combat, and receive an additional spare machine for every five contenders they destroy.

In the multiplayer mode, two to four players can compete simultaneously. In the time attack mode, the player attempts to complete a track in the shortest time. Players could enter a password received after a time attack on the F-Zero website to enter the online ranking Ghost data, transparent re-enactments of the player's time attack performances, can be saved on memory cards to race against. Up to five ghosts can be raced against simultaneously. The replay mode allows saved Grand Prix and Time Attack gameplay to be replayed with different camera angles and in-game music. The pilot profile mode has each character's biography, theme music, information on their machine, and a full motion video sequence.

Customize mode is divided between the F-Zero Shop, Garage, and Emblem Editor. The shop is where opponent machines, custom parts for vehicle creation, and miscellaneous items such as story mode chapters and staff ghost data can be purchased with tickets. Tickets are acquired as the player progresses through the Grand Prix, Time Attack, and Story mode. In the Garage section, players can create a machine with three custom parts or print emblems on any vehicle. The parts are divided into body, cockpit, and booster categories, and affect the vehicle's overall durability, maximum speed, cornering, and acceleration. The Emblem Editor lets players create decals.

F-Zero GX is the first F-Zero game to feature a story mode. Players control the pilot Captain Falcon in nine chapters of various racing scenarios, including Falcon's training regiment, a race against a rival through a canyon with falling boulders, a battle against a rival gang, and an escape from a collapsing building through closing blast doors. Each chapter can be completed on a normal, hard, and very hard difficulty setting. Toshihiro Nagoshi, one of the co-producers, said the development team wanted to explain the characters' motivations and flesh out the game world.

== Arcade version ==
F-Zero AX
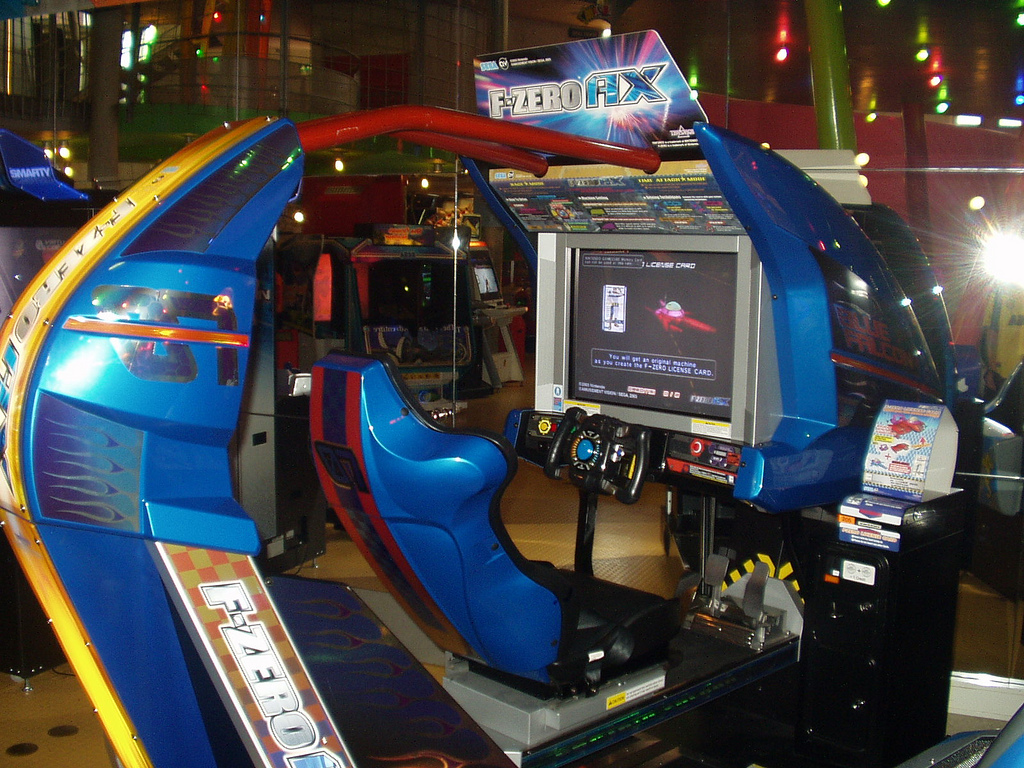
- F-Zero AX deluxe cabinet
- Publisher: Sega
- Platform: Arcade
- Release: JP: 2003; NA: September 2003
- Modes: Single-player, multiplayer
- Arcade system: Triforce

Amusement Vision developed an arcade version, F-Zero AX. It was the second Sega game to use the Triforce arcade system board, which was conceived from a business alliance between Sega, Nintendo and Namco. The hardware allows for connectivity between the GameCube and arcade games.

F-Zero AX's arcade cabinet was manufactured in standard and deluxe versions. The standard version is a regular sit-down model, while the deluxe version is shaped like Captain Falcon's vehicle and has a tilting seat simulating the craft's cockpit. IGN demoed the Cycraft version dubbed "F-Zero Monster Ride" at the 2003 JAMMA arcade show. The Cycraft machine, co-developed between Sega and Simuline, is a cabin suspended in midair controlled by three servomotors for an in-depth motion-based simulation.

AX features 14 playable vehicles with their pilots, consisting of ten newcomers and the four returning characters from the original F-Zero, as well as six race tracks. Each track must be completed before time runs out. Time extensions are awarded for reaching multiple checkpoints on a course however, the player will receive time penalties for falling off-course or depleting their energy meter. Two gameplay modes are available: Race mode, in which the player races against twenty-nine opponents; and Time Attack mode, in which the player attempts to complete a track in the fastest time possible. Connecting multiple cabinets opens up "Versus Play" in the race mode, thus enabling up to four players to compete simultaneously.

=== Data storage devices ===
F-Zero AX cabinets can dispense magnetic stripe cards to keep track of custom machine data, pilot points, and race data. A card was bundled with the Japanese release of F-Zero GX. The card expires after fifty uses, but its data can be transferred to a new card. Once inserted, the game builds a machine with three custom parts which can be upgraded by earning pilot points. Pilot points are acquired as the player progresses through the Race and Time Attack modes. Players earn more points by improving their finishing place, eliminating opponents, and finishing races with a large amount of energy reserved. A magnetic stripe card is needed to enter the F-Zero AX internet ranking system. Similarly to GX, players received a password after completing a time attack race to enter on the F-Zero website ranking system.

GameCube memory cards, on which saved games are kept, can be inserted into the arcade units. A memory card is required for players to win the AX-exclusive machine parts for use in GX, though it also gives players an opportunity to unlock the AX characters, vehicles, and tracks in an alternate way. Players can store up to four machines from GX on a memory card, then use them in AX. If a memory card is used with a magnetic stripe card, players can also enter stored GX machines into the F-Zero AX internet ranking system and transfer custom AX machine parts to GX. AX content can also be acquired by completing GX's tougher challenges, by using a cheat device, or by using cheat codes discovered in 2026. A set of unique parts could be unlocked by attending special events in Japan or by using the cheat codes.

== Development ==
After Sega transitioned from first to third-party development in 2001, they developed a close relationship with Nintendo, their former competitor in the console wars. Toshihiro Nagoshi, president of Sega subsidiary Amusement Vision, developed Super Monkey Ball for the GameCube, which created the opportunity for a collaboration. On February 18, 2002, Nintendo announced the "Triforce" arcade board, developed by Nintendo, Namco, and Sega. The idea originated after discussions between Sega and Namco about the capabilities and cost effectiveness of the GameCube architecture to make arcade games. Sega wanted to support it with software that would "stand out and draw attention to Nintendo's platform". Nagoshi agreed to create a driving game and agreed under the stipulation he could come up with something unique—which was working on the next installment in Nintendo's F-Zero series. Nagoshi contemplated declining due to the pressure of impressing Nintendo and creating the next installment of an esteemed franchise, but his curiosity about what he and his team could create overcame his hesitation.

"With Nintendo, it comes to a question of letting some other companies work on our franchises. We focus more on specific relationships with talented producers; we look for people who will care, spend a lot of time and energy, on a specific franchise. We also want to allow these producers to work on franchises that they are interested in working on."

— Shigeru Miyamoto, Nintendo EAD General Manager, July 7, 2003.

In March 2002, Sega and Nintendo announced they would collaborate to release F-Zero games for Triforce and GameCube. F-Zero GX and AX was the first significant software collaboration between Nintendo and Sega, and the announcement that Nintendo had handled development of one of its franchises to Sega surprised some critics. Nagoshi said the original F-Zero (1990) had "taught me what a game should be" and had influenced racing games he had created, such as Daytona USA (1994). The Nintendo producer Shigeru Miyamoto said Nintendo had many fans among the current generation of game developers, including Nagoshii. He felt the collaboration resulted in a "true evolution" of F-Zero, enhancing the simulation of racing at high speeds and expanding the F-Zero world.

While Amusement Vision was responsible for most of the development, Miyamoto and Takaya Imamura of Nintendo EAD took on the roles of producer and supervisor. Sega handled planning and execution and Nintendo supervised. Nagoshi was initially concerned about differences in opinion, and said: "If Nintendo planned to hold our hands through development, I would have suggested they develop the game themselves. That way we could focus on a project which would reflect our studio's abilities. I figured that would cause a war, but I was told most of the responsibility would be left to us."

F-Zero GX runs on an enhanced version of the engine used in Super Monkey Ball. Nagoshi focused on what he called its self-explanatory "interface" and "rhythm" to give the way the tracks are laid out a rhythmic feel. The soundtrack features rock and techno music composed by Hidenori Shoji and Daiki Kasho. Shojii had composed for Daytona USA 2 and Fighting Vipers 2, while Kasho worked on the Gran Turismo series. Kasho composed the character themes and their lyrics were by Alan Brey. Shoji and Kasho supervised the audio mastering.

Nintendo revealed the first footage of F-Zero GX at the pre-E3 press conference on May 21, 2002. In March 2003, Nintendo announced that GX had been by delayed two months. Via a live video conference call from Japan on July 7, Miyamoto, Nagoshi, and Imamura answered questions about GX and AX. Miyamoto announced the Japanese version was finished and would soon be revealed. Nagoshi said the team had hoped to include a local area network (LAN) multiplayer mode, but had abandoned this to focus on the single-player mode. Imamura said that though he worked directly on previous F-Zero games, on GX and AX he worked more as a producer. He said he could not imagine how they could take the F-Zero franchise beyond GX and AX.

== Release ==
F-Zero GX was published by Nintendo in Japan on July 25, 2003, North America on August 25, Australia on October 24, and Europe on October 31. AX was released alongside it in 2003. In North America, a demo was released via a special edition bonus disc packaged with Mario Kart: Double Dash (2003). F-Zero GX was added to the Nintendo Classics library for the Nintendo Switch 2 on June 5, 2025.

F-Zero GX/AX Original Soundtracks, a two-CD set composed of BGM soundtracks to the video games GX and its arcade counterpart, was released in Japan under the Scitron Digital Content record label on July 22, 2004. The first disc consists of forty-one tracks and the second has forty with a bonus arrangement of "Big Blue" by SuperSweep's Ayako Saso.

== Reception ==
Reception

Aggregate score
Aggregator	Score
Metacritic	89/100

Review scores
Publication	Score
Edge	8/10
Electronic Gaming Monthly	9, 7.5, 7 of 10
Eurogamer	9/10
Famitsu	7, 8, 8, 9 of 10
GamePro	4.5/5
GameSpot	8.6/10
IGN	9.3/10
PALGN	8 1/2
X-Play	4/5

F-Zero GX has an average score of 89/100 on the aggregate website Metacritic. Some video game journalists consider it one of the best racers of its time and the greatest racer on the GameCube.

F-Zero GX was praised for its visuals, arcade-home connectivity, longevity, sharp controls, tough challenge, and fleshed-out single-player modes. The most common criticism was for its difficulty, especially in the story mode. It earned fourth place in IGN's and GameTrailers' toughest games to beat. GameTrailers said F-Zero GX demanded players to master the "rollercoaster-style tracks [which] required hairline precision" to avoid falling off-course. Electronic Gaming Monthly criticized GX's sharp increase in difficulty. GameSpot's Jeff Gerstmann agreed, writing it "will surely turn some people away before they've seen the 20 tracks and unlocked all the story mode chapters". Bryn Williams of GameSpy said that "purists may find it too similar to the N64 version" and criticized the lack of LAN play.

1UP.com stated that the F-Zero series is "finally running on hardware that can do it proper justice". Eurogamer's Kristan Reed pointed out that, graphically, "it's hard to imagine how Amusement Vision could have done a better job". Matt Casamassina of IGN said Amusement Vision had "done a fine job of taking Nintendo's dated franchise and updating it for the new generation ... For some, GX will be the ultimate racer. For others, it will be flat out too difficult." In Japan, F-Zero GX sold 100,981 copies. It qualified for the Player's Choice line in Europe and North America by selling at least 250,000 copies. In 2018, Nagoshi said that F-Zero GX had sold more than 1.5 million copies worldwide.

IGN named F-Zero GX the best GameCube racing game and the best racing game of 2003. GameSpot named it the best GameCube game of August 2003 and best GameCube driving game of 2003. In 2004, it was nominated for "Console Racing Game of the Year" at the 7th Annual Interactive Achievement Awards held by the Academy of Interactive Arts & Sciences. In 2007, Edge named it the 66th-best game. In 2009, Official Nintendo Magazine ranked it the 92nd-best game on Nintendo platforms, saying it was "a treat for hardcore fans".
