= Suzak Inc. =

Japanese video game developer

- Type: Public
- Industry: Video games
- Founded: June 26, 2000
- Defunct: August 17, 2012
- Fate: Bankruptcy
- Headquarters: 〒 153-0062; 1-7-13 Tokyo, Meguro-ku, Mita 1-7-13, Japan
- Key people: Masahiro Yonezawa (President); Jae Jae Yu
- Number of employees: 39
- Website: suzak.co.jp (archived)

Suzak Inc. (株式会社朱雀, Kabushiki-gaisha Suzaku) was a Japanese video game developer based in Tokyo. Suzak worked with Nintendo to create games based on their intellectual property, such as Wario: Master of Disguise and F-Zero Climax. They created numerous games for PlayStation 2, Game Boy Advance, and Nintendo DS.

== History ==
Suzak was founded on June 26, 2000. On August 17, 2012, the company filed for bankruptcy. The approximate amount of debt at the time was 700 million yen.

== Games developed ==
Year	Title	Publisher(s)	Platform(s)	Ref.
2002	Domo-kun no Fushigi Terebi	Nintendo	Game Boy Advance	
2003	F-Zero: GP Legend	Nintendo	Game Boy Advance	
2003	Shin Megami Tensei: Devil Children: Puzzle de Call		Game Boy Advance	
2004	F-Zero: Climax	Nintendo	Game Boy Advance	
2004	Kaiketsu Zorori Mezase! Itazura King	Bandai	PlayStation 2	
2005	Catan		N-Gage	
2005	Shin Bakusou Dekotora Densetsu: Tenkatou Icchoujou Kessen		PlayStation 2	
2006	Kousoku Kidoutai: World Super Police		PlayStation 2	
2006	Rhythmic Star!		PlayStation 2	
2006	Tengai Makyō II: Manji Maru	Hudson Soft	Nintendo DS	
2007	Zekkyō Senshi Sakeburein	Nintendo	Nintendo DS	
2007	Wario: Master of Disguise	Nintendo	Nintendo DS	
2008	Dokapon Journey	Sting; Atlus	Nintendo DS	
2008	Zenkoku Dekotora Matsuri	Jaleco	Wii	
2009	Hard-Hat Domo	Nintendo	Nintendo DSi	
2009	Umihara Kawase Shun ~second edition~ Kanzenba	Genterprise	Nintendo DS	
2009	Wizardry: Inochi no Kusabi	Genterprise	Nintendo DS	

== Sources ==
- https://web.archive.org/web/20090106110359/http://games.ign.com/objects/780/780346.html
- https://web.archive.org/web/20120723142854/http://www.suzak.co.jp/index2.html
- http://www.gamespy.com/company/780/780346.html
- https://web.archive.org/web/20120723142915/http://www.suzak.co.jp/works.html
- http://www.gamespot.com/pages/company/index.php?company=76717
- http://www.gamefaqs.com/features/company/76717.html
- https://www.nintendo.co.jp/ds/software/bwzj/index.html
