= Tetris 99 =

2019 battle royale video game

- Developer: Arika
- Publisher: Nintendo
- Directors: Ryuichi Nakada; Akito Kitamura
- Producers: Ichirou Mihara; Hitoshi Yamagami; Akira Kinashi
- Designers: Akito Kitamura; Makoto Hasebe
- Programmer: Hitoshi Hirashima
- Composer: Teruo Taniguchi
- Series: Tetris
- Platform: Nintendo Switch
- Release: Nintendo eShop: WW: February 13, 2019; Physical release: JP: August 9, 2019; NA: September 6, 2019; EU: September 20, 2019
- Genres: Puzzle, battle royale
- Modes: Single-player, multiplayer

Tetris 99 (Note: Japanese: テトリス99, Hepburn: Tetorisu Naintī Nain) is a 2019 battle royale puzzle video game developed by Arika and published by Nintendo for the Nintendo Switch, and is an online multiplayer adaptation of Tetris. Players move and drop puzzle pieces called tetrominoes onto a playing board, and must clear rows by filling them completely with pieces. Players lose if tetrominoes overflow off the top of the board or their next piece is not able to spawn because it overlaps an existing block on the playfield. Matches contain 99 players, who send additional rows to other players' boards by clearing a row on their own board; whoever is the last man standing without an overflowed board wins the match.

Tetris 99 was released as a free digital download for Nintendo Switch Online subscribers. Paid downloadable content and a physical edition have released subsequently. It received favorable reception from critics, has been nominated for several awards, and has been played by over 2 million players. Arika would later develop similar games to Tetris 99 for other popular video game series, such as Pac-Man 99 and Super Mario Bros. 35. Nintendo also released F-Zero 99, developed by Nintendo Software Technology.

== Gameplay ==
The main gameplay screen of Tetris 99, with the boards of 98 other players seen in the background

Tetris 99 is a multiplayer puzzle game in which 99 players play against each other at the same time, with the aim to be the last player remaining. As with the traditional Tetris formula, players rotate and drop shaped bricks known as tetrominoes onto a board. Players can clear tetrominoes by completing rows across both sides, whereas players will lose if tetrominoes overflow off the top of the board. As with modern Tetris rules, players have the option to store a tetromino piece to swap out at any time. By clearing multiple lines or performing continuous line clears in a row, players can send "garbage" to other players, which will appear on their board unless they can quickly clear lines in response. More garbage can be sent by completing combination moves in succession of making a "tetris" (matching 4 lines at once) or performing a "T-spin" (squeezing the T-shaped tetromino into a position it would otherwise not fall into by rapidly rotating it).

During gameplay, small grids representing the other 98 players are displayed at the sides of the main board. Players can either choose to target individual players, or have the computer automatically target other players based on one of four criteria: random players, those who are targeting the player, those who are close to being defeated, and those who possess badges. Badges are earned by knocking out a player with garbage (or gray lines), which earns them a piece of a badge, along with any other badges or pieces that player had. The more badges a player completes and possesses, the more lines they can send to other players at a time (up to a 100% boost). At the end of a game, players will earn experience that will increase their level.

In May 2019, Nintendo released paid downloadable content (DLC) for the game, named the Big Block DLC. The DLC adds four offline modes in total: Tetris 99: Marathon, the traditional single-player Tetris mode where play continues until a fixed number of lines (150 or 999); CPU Battle, where players battle 98 bot players; Local Arena, where up to eight Nintendo Switch players play in the same arena via local wireless; and Two Player Share Battle, where two players share Joy-Con and play the same game in local co-op.

== Development ==
Tetris 99 was announced during a Nintendo Direct presentation on February 13, 2019, and made available later that day. It is available for free exclusively to players who have subscribed to the Nintendo Switch Online service. Nintendo released a physical version of the game in Japan on August 9, 2019, in North America on September 6, 2019, and in Europe on September 20, 2019. The physical edition includes the Big Block DLC content and a 12-month Nintendo Switch Online voucher.

== Promotional use ==
The game periodically features special "Maximus Cup" events; where players with the top number of wins over a weekend play period would win rewards within the My Nintendo loyalty program. In addition, later events would be used to promote other Nintendo Switch and Nintendo Switch 2 games by offering exclusive themes consisting of new sound effects, background music, sprites and UI elements based on current releases. These would either be exclusively unlocked by participating in their respective events or could be purchased with in-game tickets earned by completing daily challenges. Below is a list of all of these special themes (all dates given are in Pacific Time):

Themed game(s)	Special Theme No.	Maximus Cup duration	Purchasable via tickets
Tetris (Game Boy)	1	2019-05-17 – 2019-05-19	check
Splatoon 2	2	2019-07-12 – 2019-07-16	check
Fire Emblem: Three Houses	3	2019-08-23 – 2019-08-27	check
Super Kirby Clash	4	2019-09-20 – 2019-09-23	check
Luigi's Mansion 3	5	2019-10-25 – 2019-10-29 2020-08-17 – 2020-08-19	check
Pokémon Sword / Pokémon Shield	6	2019-11-07 – 2019-11-11 2020-10-16 – 2020-10-19	check
Ring Fit Adventure	7	2020-04-24 – 2020-04-27 2020-08-20 – 2022-08-22	check
Animal Crossing: New Horizons	8	2020-05-15 – 2020-05-18 2020-08-14 – 2020-08-16	check
Xenoblade Chronicles: Definitive Edition	9	2020-07-03 – 2020-07-06	check
Paper Mario: The Origami King	10	2020-07-31 – 2020-08-04	check
Super Mario All-Stars	11	2020-12-03 – 2020-12-07	check
Kirby Fighters 2	12	2021-01-07 – 2021-01-11	check
Super Mario 3D World + Bowser's Fury	13	2021-03-04 – 2021-03-08 2022-08-05	check
Miitopia	14	2021-06-18 – 2021-06-22 2022-08-06	check
Mario Golf: Super Rush	15	2021-07-09 – 2021-07-12 2022-08-07	check
The Legend of Zelda: Skyward Sword HD	16	2021-08-06 – 2021-08-09 2022-08-08	check
WarioWare: Get It Together!	17	2021-09-17 – 2021-09-20 2022-08-09, 2023-11-27 – 2023-12-11	check
Monster Hunter Rise	18	2021-10-08 – 2021-10-11	check
Metroid Dread	19	2021-10-29 – 2021-11-01 2022-08-10	check
Mario Party Superstars	20	2021-12-09 – 2021-12-13	check
Pokémon Legends: Arceus	21	2022-01-21 – 2022-01-25	check
Kirby and the Forgotten Land	22	2022-04-22 – 2022-04-25	check
Kirby's Dream Buffet	23	2022-12-15 – 2022-12-19	check
Fire Emblem Engage	24	2023-03-24 – 2023-03-27	check
Kirby's Return to Dream Land Deluxe	25	2023-04-21 – 2023-04-24	check
Pikmin 4	26	2023-07-07 – 2023-07-10	check
Xenoblade Chronicles 3	27	2023-09-29 – 2023-10-02	check
Super Mario RPG	28	2023-11-09 – 2023-11-13	check
WarioWare: Move It!	29	2023-11-30 – 2023-12-04	check
Super Mario Bros. Wonder	30	2023-12-14 – 2023-12-18	check
Princess Peach: Showtime!	31	2024-04-05 – 2024-04-08	check
Endless Ocean Luminous	32	2024-05-10 – 2024-05-13	check
F-Zero 99	33	2024-06-28 – 2024-07-01	check
Splatoon 3	34	2024-08-16 – 2024-08-19	check
Tetris (Nintendo Entertainment System)	35	2024-12-06 – 2024-12-10	check
The Legend of Zelda: Echoes of Wisdom	36	2024-12-19 – 2024-12-23	check
Donkey Kong Country Returns HD	37	2025-02-13 – 2025-02-17	check
Xenoblade Chronicles X: Definitive Edition	38	2025-03-14 – 2025-03-17	check
Donkey Kong Bananza	39	2025-08-01 – 2025-08-04	check
Kirby Air Riders	40	2025-12-04 – 2025-12-08	check
Animal Crossing: New Horizons	41	2026-01-08 – 2026-01-12	check
Super Mario Galaxy + Super Mario Galaxy 2	42	2026-04-03 – 2026-04-06	❌
Tomodachi Life: Living the Dream	43	2026-05-01 – 2026-05-04	❌
Yoshi and the Mysterious Book	44	2026-05-29 – 2026-06-01	❌
Star Fox	45	2026-07-10 – 2026-07-13	❌
Splatoon Raiders	46	2026-08-07 – 2026-08-10	❌
Fire Emblem: Fortune's Weave	47	2026-10-02 – 2026-10-05	❌

== Reception ==
Reception

Aggregate scores
Aggregator	Score
Metacritic	83/100
OpenCritic	89% recommend

Review scores
Publication	Score
Game Informer	8.5/10
GameSpot	8/10
IGN	8.5/10
Jeuxvideo.com	17/20
Nintendo Life	9/10

Upon release, Tetris 99 received "generally favorable reviews" according to the review aggregator website Metacritic. Fellow review aggregator OpenCritic assessed that the game received strong approval, being recommended by 89% of critics. According to IGN Tetris 99 is a "wondrous pandemonium in a battle royale bottle" and "the massive player count really ups the intensity." The Daily Telegraph said the game is "fiercer than Fortnite" and "as exciting and cutthroat as any video game deathmatch".

During a financial results briefing, Nintendo president Shuntaro Furukawa reported that Tetris 99 had been played by over 2.8 million accounts as of April 2019. Furukawa also noted that the game has boosted "user engagement" with the Nintendo Switch.

Alexey Pajitnov, the creator of the original Tetris, stated that he, "love[s] the game" and called it, "one of the best games of Tetris of the last year. I really like what was done."

=== Awards ===
Year	Award	Category	Result	Ref.
2019	2019 Golden Joystick Awards	Best Multiplayer Game	Nominated	
2019	2019 Golden Joystick Awards	Nintendo Game of the Year	Nominated	
2019	Titanium Awards	Best Family/Social Game	Nominated	
2019	The Game Awards 2019	Best Multiplayer Game	Nominated	
2020	New York Game Awards	Central Park Children's Zoo Award for Best Kids Game	Nominated	
2020	23rd Annual D.I.C.E. Awards	Online Game of the Year	Nominated	
2020	NAVGTR Awards	Engineering	Nominated	
2020	NAVGTR Awards	Gameplay Design, Franchise	Nominated	
2020	NAVGTR Awards	Game, Puzzle	Nominated	
