= F-Zero: Maximum Velocity =

2001 video game

- North American box art
- Developer: NDcube
- Publisher: Nintendo
- Director: Kazunobu Shimizu (Note: Also referred to as Isshin Shimizu)
- Producers: Takehiro Izushi; Hitoshi Yamagami
- Composers: Masaru Tajima; Mitsuteru Furukawa; Naoto Ishida
- Series: F-Zero
- Platform: Game Boy Advance
- Release: 2001
- Genre: Racing
- Modes: Single-player, multiplayer

F-Zero: Maximum Velocity (Note: Known in Japan as F-Zero for Game Boy Advance) is a 2001 racing game developed by NDcube and published by Nintendo as a launch title for the Game Boy Advance. It was the first F-Zero game released on a handheld game console.

Maximum Velocity takes place 25 years after F-Zero, in another F-Zero Grand Prix. The past generations of F-Zero had "piloted their way to fame", so it is the second F-Zero game without Captain Falcon, Samurai Goroh, Pico, or Dr. Stewart after BS F-Zero Grand Prix 2. Players control fast hovering crafts and use their speed-boosting abilities to navigate through the courses as quickly as possible.

== Gameplay ==
Every race consists of five laps around a race track. Players lose the race if their machine explodes from taking too much damage, land outside of the track, get ejected from the race due to falling to 20th place, complete a lap with a rank outside of the rank limit of that lap, or forfeit. In the single player Grand Prix mode, all of these conditions require the player to possess and use an extra machine to try again.

For each lap completed, the player is rewarded with a speed boost that can be used once; one of the "SSS" marks will be shaded green to indicate that it can be used. A boost will dramatically increase a player's speed, but will decrease their ability to turn. A boost used before a jump will cause the player to jump further, which could make it possible to use a shortcut with the right vehicle. Boost time and speed varies according to the machine, and is usually tuned for proper balance. For example, one machine has a boost time of twelve seconds, yet has the slowest boost speed of the entire game. Players can also take advantage of the varying deceleration of each vehicle. Some vehicles, such as the Jet Vermilion, take longer than others to decelerate from top boost speed to normal speed, once the boost has been used up. Players can also take advantage of this effect on boost pads.

The Grand Prix is the main single player component of Maximum Velocity. It consists of four series named after chess pieces: "Pawn", "Knight", "Bishop" and "Queen". The latter of these can be unlocked by winning the others on "Expert" mode. They have five races in four difficulty settings. "Master" mode is unlocked by winning expert mode in each series, and the player unlocks a new machine after completing it. The player must be in the top three at the end of the last lap in order to continue to the next race. If the player is unable to continue, they will lose a machine and will have to try the race again. If the player runs out of machines, the game ends, and the series will have to be restarted from the beginning.

Championship is another single player component. It is basically the same as a "Time Attack" mode, except the player can only race on one, special course: the Synobazz Championship Circuit. This special course is not selectable in any other modes.

=== Multiplayer ===
Maximum Velocity can be played in two multiplayer modes using the Game Boy Advance link cable, with one cartridge, or one cartridge per player. Two to four players can play in both modes. In single cart, only one player needs to have a cartridge. All players drive a generic craft, and the game can only be played on one level, Silence. This level, along with Fire Field, are the only areas to return from previous games. Aptly, Silence in Maximum Velocity has no background music, unlike in most other F-Zero games. In multi cart, each player needs to have a cartridge to play. This has many advantages over single cart: All players can use any machine in this game that has been unlocked by another player and can also select any course. After the race is finished, all of the players' ranking data are mixed and shared ("Mixed ranking" is stored in each cart).

== Development ==
F-Zero: Maximum Velocity was one of the first games developed by NDcube. Like the original F-Zero for SNES, Maximum Velocity implements a pseudo-3D visual technique based on the scaling and rotation effects of bitmap graphics. This technique consists of a double layer, one of which gives the illusion of depth.

== Release ==
iQue released it to the Chinese market in August 2007.

Maximum Velocity is one of ten Game Boy Advance games released on December 16, 2011, to the Nintendo 3DS Ambassador Program, a program to give free downloadable games to early adopters who bought a Nintendo 3DS before its price drop. It was also released on the Wii U Virtual Console on April 3, 2014, in Japan and April 17 in North America and Europe.

The game was re-released via the Nintendo Classics service on March 29, 2024.

== Reception ==
Reception

Aggregate score
Aggregator	Score
Metacritic	86/100

Review scores
Publication	Score
AllGame	4/5
Edge	7/10
Electronic Gaming Monthly	7/10, 7.5/10, 9/10
EP Daily	8/10
Eurogamer	9/10
Famitsu	7/10, 8/10, 9/10, 7/10
Game Informer	9/10
GameSpot	8.1/10
GameSpy	86%
IGN	9/10
Next Generation	3/5
Nintendo Life	8/10
Nintendo Power	4/5
Pocket Gamer	4/5

The game received "generally favorable reviews" according to the review aggregation website Metacritic. NextGen, however, called it "A classic SNES racer that ports well, although the look is definitely dated." In Japan, Famitsu gave it a score of 31 out of 40. Uncle Dust of GamePro said that the game was "every bit as good, if not better, than the amazing SNES version—it's a must-buy in the launch lineup." (Note: GamePro gave the game 4.5/5 for graphics, two 4/5 scores for sound and control, and 5/5 for fun factor.)

The game went on to sell 334,145 units in Japan and 273,229 units in the U.S. as of 2005. The game has total sales of over 1 million units worldwide.
