= Nintendo Switch Online =

Suite of online services for the Nintendo Switch & Nintendo Switch 2

- Developer: Nintendo
- Type: Online service
- Launched: September 18, 2018; 8 years ago
- Platforms: Nintendo Switch; Nintendo Switch 2
- Status: Online
- Members: 34 million (as of September 2025)
- Website: nintendo.com/switch/online

Nintendo Switch Online (NSO) is an online subscription service operated by Nintendo for its video game consoles, the Nintendo Switch and Nintendo Switch 2. The service is Nintendo's third-generation online service after Nintendo Wi-Fi Connection and the Nintendo Network. The subscription service officially launched on September 18, 2018; an expanded tier of the service, Nintendo Switch Online + Expansion Pack, was released on October 25, 2021.

Nintendo Switch Online features include online multiplayer, cloud saving, voice chat via a smartphone app or GameChat, access to special profile pictures, as well as other promotions and offers. The service also includes access to a library of emulated retro games called Nintendo Classics. Nintendo Switch Online + Expansion Pack includes access to additional retro systems' libraries (up to GameCube as of June 2025) and downloadable content for Animal Crossing: New Horizons, Mario Kart 8 Deluxe and Splatoon 2. The Nintendo Switch 2 Edition upgrade packs for The Legend of Zelda: Breath of the Wild and The Legend of Zelda: Tears of the Kingdom were added as additional benefits for Expansion Pack members in June 2025.

The base service on the original Nintendo Switch received mixed reviews; criticism at launch was directed at the requirement of using a smartphone app for voice chat, software library, limited selection of cloud save titles, and technical issues, although its price was praised. The Expansion Pack add-on also received divided responses, with controversy directed at its higher price.

== History ==
The Nintendo Switch was announced in October 2016 and released on March 3, 2017. Nintendo stated in its pre-release announcements that the system would eventually require the purchase of a paid "online service" but that they would be available to all users at no charge until the service launched. Features announced included a companion smartphone app, as well as access to a free Nintendo Entertainment System game per month. The service was initially planned for late 2017. By June 2017, Nintendo pushed back the service's release until late December 2018, but did establish the pricing plans for the service, with an average annual price of US$20, depending on the region. From July 21, 2017, Nintendo offered an interim period featuring online multiplayer free of charge and the launch of the Nintendo Switch Online smartphone app.

Then-Nintendo of America president Reggie Fils-Aimé explained that the delays were to ensure that the service was "world-class", and had enough of its announced functionality available on-launch to justify its cost. Nintendo aimed for a lower price point in comparison to PlayStation Plus and Xbox Live Gold, as the service does not include the same range of features as these subscription services provide. Then-Nintendo president Tatsumi Kimishima stated that the price point was a subject of importance in designing the Switch's online services, and that regardless of what competitors were doing, "it's a matter of getting our content to the consumer at a price point that would make them happy, and then we're willing to look at what else we can do going forward."

The Nintendo Switch Online service was launched on September 18, 2018. A Nintendo Direct five days before the release detailed the full set of features that would be part of the Online service, including a larger and persistent library of NES games with 20 available on launch, and more to be added on an ongoing basis, as well as cloud save support. The initial launch covered 43 markets, with more markets expected to follow later.

In September 2018, the same month as the Nintendo Switch Online service had its full launch, Nintendo Switch consoles imported to mainland China started experiencing connectivity issues due to the Nintendo Switch Online service using Google's servers, which are blocked in China. The Nintendo Switch would eventually officially launch in China on December 10, 2019, with Tencent providing free network services powered by WeChat, in lieu of the Nintendo Switch Online service. These network services were discontinued on May 15, 2026, at 22:00 PM (UTC+08:00).

Subsequently, the Nintendo Switch Online service officially launched in South Korea and Hong Kong on April 23, 2019, in Israel on August 20, 2019, in Taiwan on September 9, 2025, in Singapore, Malaysia, and Thailand on November 18, 2025, and in the Philippines on November 10, 2026. The service was officially suspended in Russia on May 31, 2023, due to payment processors discontinuing business in the market for more than a year following the 2022 invasion in Ukraine.

On September 5, 2019, Super NES games were added to the service under a separate app. On December 1, 2020, the 11.0.0 software update for the Nintendo Switch system software was released, which added a Nintendo Switch Online app to the console's home screen.

Nintendo introduced a new subscription tier known as Nintendo Switch Online + Expansion Pack on October 26, 2021; this tier primarily adds Nintendo 64 and Sega Genesis titles to the classic games service. It also added Animal Crossing: New Horizons – Happy Home Paradise as the first of several pieces of downloadable content that users have free access to for the duration of the subscription. This tier was priced at US$50 per year on average or US$80 for the family subscription option (including the base price of $20 from the original service). In February 2023, Nintendo added Game Boy, Game Boy Color and Game Boy Advance titles to the service. The standard subscription gave access to the Game Boy and Game Boy Color titles, while Game Boy Advance titles required the Expansion Pack tier. In November 2023, Nintendo launched a new version of the Nintendo 64 - Nintendo Switch Online in Japan for games that received a CERO Z rating, dubbed NINTENDO 64 Nintendo Switch Online +18. A similar version was released for users outside Japan on June 18, 2024, called Nintendo 64 – Nintendo Switch Online: MATURE 17+.

During a financial meeting in November 2024, Nintendo President Shuntaro Furukawa stated that the Nintendo Switch Online service will come to the Nintendo Switch 2 as well.

=== Usage ===
By December 31, 2018, approximately three months after its launch, the service had gained more than eight million subscribers. Nintendo reported in late-April 2019 that the service had 9.8 million subscribers. The service reached over 10 million subscribers by July 2019, and over 15 million by January 2020. The service had reached over 26 million members by September 2020. By September 2021, the service had reached 32 million subscribers.

In May 2022, Nintendo President Shuntaro Furukawa claimed in an interview that subscribers of the paid service had "gradually" increased, adding that a large percentage of the new members were in the United States.

== Features ==
=== Online multiplayer ===
Nintendo Switch Online is required to access online multiplayer on the majority of titles. Some free-to-play multiplayer games, such as Fortnite Battle Royale and Warframe, and games published in China (due to the Chinese version of Nintendo Switch lacking the Nintendo Switch Online service), are exempt from this requirement, and can be played online freely without a subscription.

=== Cloud saves ===
Cloud storage allows save data for supported games to be synchronized online, so it can be recovered if the user must move their Nintendo Account to a different Switch console or if they use multiple consoles. Users will lose access to their cloud saves should they allow their subscription to lapse, though there is a grace period of six months to renew the subscription and recover them before they are purged.

The feature is not supported for some first and third-party games, including those with certain forms of online functionality such as item trading and competitive rankings. Nintendo cites concerns surrounding the possibility of abuse that could "unfairly affect" gameplay as the reason for those games not allowing for cloud saves.

=== Companion app ===
The Nintendo Switch App (formerly called the Nintendo Switch Online mobile app) is a console companion application developed and published by Nintendo for use alongside the Nintendo Switch Online service. Released on July 21, 2017 for use on iOS and Android devices. The app features voice chat and "game-specific services" for games such as Splatoon 2, Mario Kart 8 Deluxe, Arms, Mario Tennis Aces, Nintendo Entertainment System for Nintendo Switch Online, Super Smash Bros. Ultimate, and Animal Crossing: New Horizons. Following a major update in May 2025, the app currently supports functions that does not require a Nintendo Switch Online subscription, such as on the Nintendo Switch 2, users are able to export screenshots and videos from games onto the app.

=== Communication ===
Users can voice chat through the Nintendo Switch App on smartphones. Voice chat functionality is not available natively through the Switch console; Reggie Fils-Aimé justified the decision by explaining that "Nintendo's approach is to do things differently. We have a much different suite of experiences than our competitors offer, and we do that in a different way. This creates a sort of yin and yang for our consumers. They're excited about cloud saves and legacy content but wish we might deliver voice chat a different way, for example." During a later interview, Kouichi Kawamoto revealed that the developers wanted to include voice chat as a feature of the system itself, but "were unable to implement it without affecting game performance due to the Switch system's processing capability limitations", and instead decided to offer it via a smart device. This was later implemented on the Switch's successor, the Switch 2 through a built in application called GameChat, allowing video calls and screen sharing through the console itself alongside voice chat without requiring an external smartphone.

=== Nintendo Classics ===
Since the Wii era, Nintendo typically offered retro games from their older consoles through the brand Virtual Console, using first-party emulators to run the games on their newer consoles. However, starting with the Nintendo Switch family, Nintendo would not use the Virtual Console brand. Instead, retro games have been released under the brand "Nintendo Classics" on both the Switch and Switch 2. Subscribers to Nintendo Switch Online can access apps to play retro games for antecedent video game systems, with the emulation software for the service mostly handled by NERD. Games with multiplayer modes support both local and online play. During its first year, the Online service distributed Nintendo Entertainment System (NES) games, and later added Super Nintendo Entertainment System (SNES) titles in September 2019. Nintendo has expanded both libraries over time. Starting in October 2021, subscribers can purchase an expansion to play Nintendo 64 and Sega Genesis games; unlike the other systems, the emulation software for these consoles was principally done by iQue and M2, respectively. In February 2023, games for the Game Boy/Game Boy Color were added to the base Nintendo Switch Online subscription, while games for the Game Boy Advance were made available for those who purchase the Expansion Pack. Starting in June 2025, games for the GameCube were also made available for those with the Expansion Pack exclusively on Nintendo Switch 2. In certain cases, some of these games have been reworked to support multiplayer gameplay for up to four players locally and online. Virtual Boy games were added in February 2026, though they require a separate accessory or a cardboard kit that the Switch or Switch 2 fits into to provide the stereoscopic vision.

=== Offers and promotions ===
Switch Online subscribers are also granted access to special offers and promotions from Nintendo; on launch, those who purchased a 12-month subscription or family plan received special in-game items for Splatoon 2, and Nintendo opened exclusive pre-orders for special wireless controllers based on the NES controller, specifically intended for use with the aforementioned NES app. Similarly, a special wireless SNES-based controller designed to work with the Switch was made available to purchase exclusively to Online subscribers shortly after the service added support for SNES titles. Ahead of the October 2021 expansion pack to support Nintendo 64 and Sega Genesis games, Nintendo announced the availability of two Switch controllers available to Online subscribers based on the Nintendo 64 and the three-button Genesis controller form factors, while a controller based on the six-button Mega Drive controller will be available to Japan subscribers. Controllers based on the Famicom and Super Famicom were also released for their respective companion apps in Japan. With the announcement of GameCube games coming to the service, a controller based on the GameCube controller was also revealed.

Coinciding with the anticipated release of Super Mario Maker 2, a price-reduction promotion was announced during the game's Nintendo Direct that was available exclusively to Nintendo Switch Online members. The promotion introduced "Nintendo Switch Game Vouchers", which allows purchasers to download two qualifying Nintendo Switch games for a set price of $99.99 MSRP, compared to a $120 sum of buying both games separately.

Nintendo has also offered free original games for those with an Online subscription. Tetris 99 was released as a free-to-play title for subscribers in February 2019, though has subsequently offered paid downloadable content and retail versions of the game for non-subscribers. Super Mario Bros. 35 was released on October 1, 2020, for a limited time to celebrate the anniversary of the Super Mario franchise, and was discontinued on March 31, 2021. Pac-Man 99 was released on April 7, 2021, alongside paid downloadable content, and was discontinued on October 8, 2023. F-Zero 99 was released on September 14, 2023, and was scheduled to have free updates through October 2023, however it has received new content through October 2024.

Upon the introduction of the Expansion Pack in 2021, free access to select downloadable content for retail games also became available for subscribers of the higher tier. The first of these was Animal Crossing: New Horizons's "Happy Home Paradise" DLC. Mario Kart 8 Deluxe's "Booster Course Pass" and Splatoon 2's "Octo Expansion" DLC would be added the following year. The Nintendo Switch 2 Editions for The Legend of Zelda: Breath of the Wild and The Legend of Zelda: Tears of the Kingdom, featuring improved frame rates and resolution as well as access to the Zelda Notes feature via the mobile app, were announced as additional benefits for Expansion Pack members in April 2025.

=== Missions and rewards ===
Missions and rewards were launched in March 2022. These missions, to be offered on a rotating basis, give the user opportunities to earn Nintendo platinum points by completing certain activities with the Switch software or in various games. The points can then be redeemed to purchase digital items to be used within the Nintendo Switch app, as well as towards physical items at the Nintendo store.

On June 9, 2026, Nintendo launched the DK Challenge, a mission system rewarding players for completing objectives in various Donkey Kong series games available through the Nintendo Classics service, as well as in Donkey Kong Bananza. Upon completing various objectives, players were rewarded with "challenge cards" correlating with the completed mission. The set of challenges is available from June 9, 2026 to September 1, 2026.

=== Game Trials ===
Game Trials are a feature that allows members to try out a game for one week. The game would be the same as if a person were to buy the game regularly. Games that are on Game Trials usually also go on sale on the eShop. If subscribers bought the game, any progress made on the trial will transfer to the game.

=== Playtest Program ===
Nintendo Switch Online: Playtest Program
- Publisher: Nintendo
- Platforms: Nintendo Switch; Nintendo Switch 2
- Release: First playtest Oct 23 - Nov 5, 2024; Second playtest Jul 29 - Aug 10, 2025
- Mode: Multiplayer

On October 9, 2024, Nintendo announced a program titled Nintendo Switch Online: Playtest Program, which allowed select users who successfully applied the following day to test an upcoming feature for Nintendo Switch Online. The playtest was only open to Nintendo Switch Online + Expansion Pack members whose Nintendo Account region was set to Japan, the United States, the United Kingdom, France, Italy, Germany, and Spain and whose age is 18 or over. The playtest ran from October 23, 2024, to November 5, 2024. A second run of the playtest ran from July 29, 2025, to August 10, 2025. This version was open to Canada, Brazil, and Mexico in addition to the first playtest regions.

Reports on leaks of the first playtest revealed it was a multiplayer creative sandbox game that allowed players to "discover new lands, enemies, and resources that will become essential", with the goal being to "fully develop a massive, expansive planet by utilizing creativity and farmed resources". Comparisons were made to Minecraft. No leaks were reported on for the second playtest, though it was confirmed to be the "same service" as the 2024 test.

=== Nintendo Music ===
Nintendo Music is a music streaming service app featuring various Nintendo video game music soundtracks that was released for Android and iOS on October 31, 2024. Whilst the app is free to download, it requires Nintendo Switch Online to access the app's content, but all subscribers can use the service at no additional charge. The app functions similarly to other services such as Spotify as it can create curated playlists based on Nintendo soundtracks and can download music for offline listening. The app also features a spoiler feature that can hide music and can extend certain songs by 15–60 minutes.

== Reception ==
Reviews for the service have been mostly mixed. Its affordable price compared to other online services has been generally praised, but its smartphone app (which is required for voice chat on Nintendo Switch), content library, the initially small selection of cloud save-supported games (and lack of support for first party games such as Splatoon 2, 1-2-Switch, and Pokémon: Let's Go, Pikachu! and Let's Go, Eevee!) have been criticized. Additionally, various titles published by Nintendo after the introduction of the paid Nintendo Switch Online subscription service have drawn criticism for various network-related technical reasons, such as a significantly lower tick rate compared to games on the Nintendo Network and Nintendo Wi-Fi Connection, use of delay-based netcode type instead of rollback and use of Peer-to-peer connections instead of dedicated servers.

During the Nintendo Direct on September 23, 2021, the addition of Nintendo 64 and Sega Genesis games for Nintendo Switch Online, exclusive to the Expansion Pack, was revealed. During the Animal Crossing: New Horizons Direct on October 15, 2021, the price of the Expansion Pack was revealed, drawing widespread criticism. The same day, Nintendo uploaded a trailer to YouTube detailing the Expansion Pack, which was received negatively, with about 120,000 dislikes as of November 1, 2021, becoming the most disliked video on the channel. The Nintendo 64 games emulated via the Expansion Pack were found to have several performance issues, including input lag and frame rate issues. The fixed remapping of controls designed for the six-button Nintendo 64 controller to the four-button Switch Joy-Con also affected games like Sin & Punishment. Multiplayer games like Mario Kart 64 also appeared to use netcode that Nintendo had previously used in prior Virtual Console releases which forced the game to pause for other players until all players were synchronized. The games also did not support a virtual equivalent of the Controller Pak memory expansion, preventing players from utilizing ghost data in Mario Kart 64 or the native method of saving in WinBack. Informal tests found that the Nintendo Switch Online version of selected Nintendo 64 games performed worse than compared to the same games available on the Wii U's Virtual Console. On the February 8, 2023 Nintendo Direct, Nintendo announced the addition of Game Boy Advance games to the Expansion Pack and Game Boy and Game Boy Color games to all users of the service. The additions have been well received, but the lack of notable games in its content library has been criticized.

== See also ==
- Nintendo Classics
- PlayStation Network
- Xbox network
