= F-Zero X =

1998 video game

- North American Nintendo 64 box art
- Developer: Nintendo EAD
- Publisher: Nintendo
- Director: Tadashi Sugiyama
- Producer: Shigeru Miyamoto
- Artist: Takaya Imamura
- Composers: Taro Bando; Hajime Wakai
- Series: F-Zero
- Platforms: Nintendo 64, iQue Player
- Release: Nintendo 64: JP: July 14, 1998; NA: October 27, 1998; EU: November 6, 1998; iQue Player: CHN: February 25, 2004
- Genre: Racing
- Modes: Single-player, multiplayer

F-Zero X (Note: Japanese: エフゼロ エックス, Hepburn: Efu-zero Ekkusu) is a 1998 racing game developed and published by Nintendo for the Nintendo 64. It is the sequel to the original F-Zero (1990), and the first F-Zero game with 3D graphics. It has a steep learning curve and its gameplay experience is similar to that of the original. The F-Zero X Expansion Kit, an expansion pack for the 64DD featuring 12 more tracks and track and vehicle editors, was released in Japan in 2000.

F-Zero X introduced the ability to attack other racers, a Death Race mode, and a random track generator called the "X Cup". In the Death Race, the player's objective is to rapidly annihilate or pass the 29 other racers, and the X Cup generates a different set of tracks each time played. Critics generally praised F-Zero X for its fast gameplay, abundance of courses and vehicles, track design, and maintaining a high framerate, although it has been widely criticized for its lack of graphical detail. F-Zero X was ported in 2004 to the iQue Player and had re-releases through the Virtual Console for Wii in 2007, later on Wii U, and through the Nintendo Classics service, featuring online multiplayer, in 2022.

== Gameplay ==
Graphical detail is sacrificed to maintain a stable 60 frames per second (FPS).

F-Zero X is a fast-paced futuristic racing video game where 30 competitors race on high-altitude circuits inside plasma-powered hovercars in an intergalactic Grand Prix. Taking place after the original tournament was discontinued for several years due to the extreme danger of the sport, F-Zero X begins after the Grand Prix is brought back with the rules and regulations revised under the same name as the video game. The tracks include hills, loops, tunnels, corkscrews, and pipes. Players can drift into turns without losing momentum by using the control stick and trigger button. The game introduces 26 vehicles, and reprises the 4 from the original F-Zero game. Each has its own performance abilities affected by its size and weight, and a grip, boost, and durability trait graded on an A to E (best to worst) scale. Before a race, players are able to adjust a vehicle's balance between maximum acceleration and maximum top speed.

Each machine's energy meter measures the machine's health and is decreased, for example, when the machine hits another racer or the side of the track. This is also a boost meter for manually boosting, usually starting with the second lap of a race. Energy can be replenished by driving over recharge strips, located at various points around the track. The game introduces the ability to attack other racers with either a side or spin attack. Dash plates in various locations give a speed boost without using any energy. Courses may have obstacles that reduce speed and traps that launch vehicles into the air, reducing its energy. If the player has a "spare machine"—the equivalent of an extra life—then falls off a track or runs out of energy, the race can be restarted. Players get an additional spare machine for every 5 contenders eliminated.

=== Race modes ===
F-Zero X has 5 different gameplay modes: GP (Grand Prix) Race, Practice, Time Attack, Death Race, and VS Battle. In GP Race, the player races against 29 opponents through 3 laps of each track in a cup. Players get a certain number of points for finishing a track depending on where they placed, and the winner of the cup is the character who receives the most total points. Each cup has 4 selectable difficulty levels: Novice, Standard, Expert, and Master. The higher the difficulty level selected, the tougher the opponents, and less spare machines the player starts with. Furthermore, the 3 cups initially available are ordered by increasing difficulty (Jack, Queen, and King respectively) and 6 tracks each. Eventually, the player can unlock the Joker Cup with its set of 6 tracks, followed by the X Cup. The X Cup is a set of 6 tracks that are randomly generated on each playthrough. The randomized track elements lack loops and can vary widely in intricacy.

Practice mode demonstrates any track with opponents. Time Attack lets the player choose a track and complete a 3-lap race in the shortest time possible. Transparent re-enactments of Time Attack performances, allow racing against ghost racers, recorded by the player or game developer. Up to 3 player-contributed ghosts can be raced against simultaneously, but only 1 can be saved per track. Death Race has the player annihilating the 29 other racers as speedily as possible on a specialized course. There is no selectable difficulty level, or set number of laps, but the boost is immediately available. Vs. Battle is the multiplayer mode where 2 to 4 players compete in a 3-lap race, and slots not in use by players can be operated by the artificial intelligence. A slot machine for those out of the race early will appear if the option is enabled. Players can adversely affect the energy levels of those still competing by matching symbols.

== Development and release ==
[I]t's not possible to measure how fast your car can go in [F-Zero X], but it's possibly about 1,000 kilometers per hour — possibly the fastest racing game ever for a home system.

— Producer Shigeru Miyamoto, 1997

In mid-1996, during Mario Kart 64 development, Shigeru Miyamoto said he planned a sequel to F-Zero for the Nintendo 64. Initially titled "F-Zero 64", Famitsu magazine revealed the project in mid-1997. Tadashi Sugiyama and Shigeru Miyamoto served as director and producer, respectively. Taro Bando and Hajime Wakai served as composers. Several key Wave Race 64 programmers including the lead programmer made up the in-house development team. Developed by Nintendo EAD, it is the sequel to the original F-Zero (1990), and is the first F-Zero installment with 3D graphics. It debuted at the Nintendo Space World event on November 20, 1997, publicly playable for the first time. IGN reported this version was 60% complete and consistently ran at 60 frames per second. That framerate required developers to minimize background detail, texture detail, and polygon count on vehicles which reduce as they pass. They noted that "[tracks] hide most of the limited backgrounds with their girth and undulating nature which block out almost everything else." Fogging effects are used to hide background shortcomings such as where the sky and ground meet.

The character voices, including the announcer, Mr. Zero, were provided by Jim Wornell and Kayomi McDonald. Wornell based Mr. Zero's voice on that of the announcer in Ridge Racer. The soundtrack includes remixes from its predecessor. The ROM cartridge size necessitated data-saving optimizations, including a half-sized monaural soundtrack and real-time stereo ambient effects. Some of its music is included in two soundtrack CDs. The F-Zero X Original Soundtrack was released on September 18, 1998, with 29 musical tracks. The F-Zero X Guitar Arrange Edition was released on January 27, 1999, with ten guitar arrangements.

F-Zero X was released in Japan on July 14, 1998, but its North American release suffered a three-month delay due to Nintendo's policy of evenly spacing the release of first-party games. It was released in North America on October 27, in Europe on November 6, and in China for the iQue Player on February 25, 2004. It was re-released on the Wii and Wii U Virtual Console in 2007 and around 2016, respectively. This was Europe's 100th Wii Virtual Console game. A March 2022 re-release for the Nintendo Classics service has a 2 to 4-person online multiplayer mode.

=== Expansion Kit ===
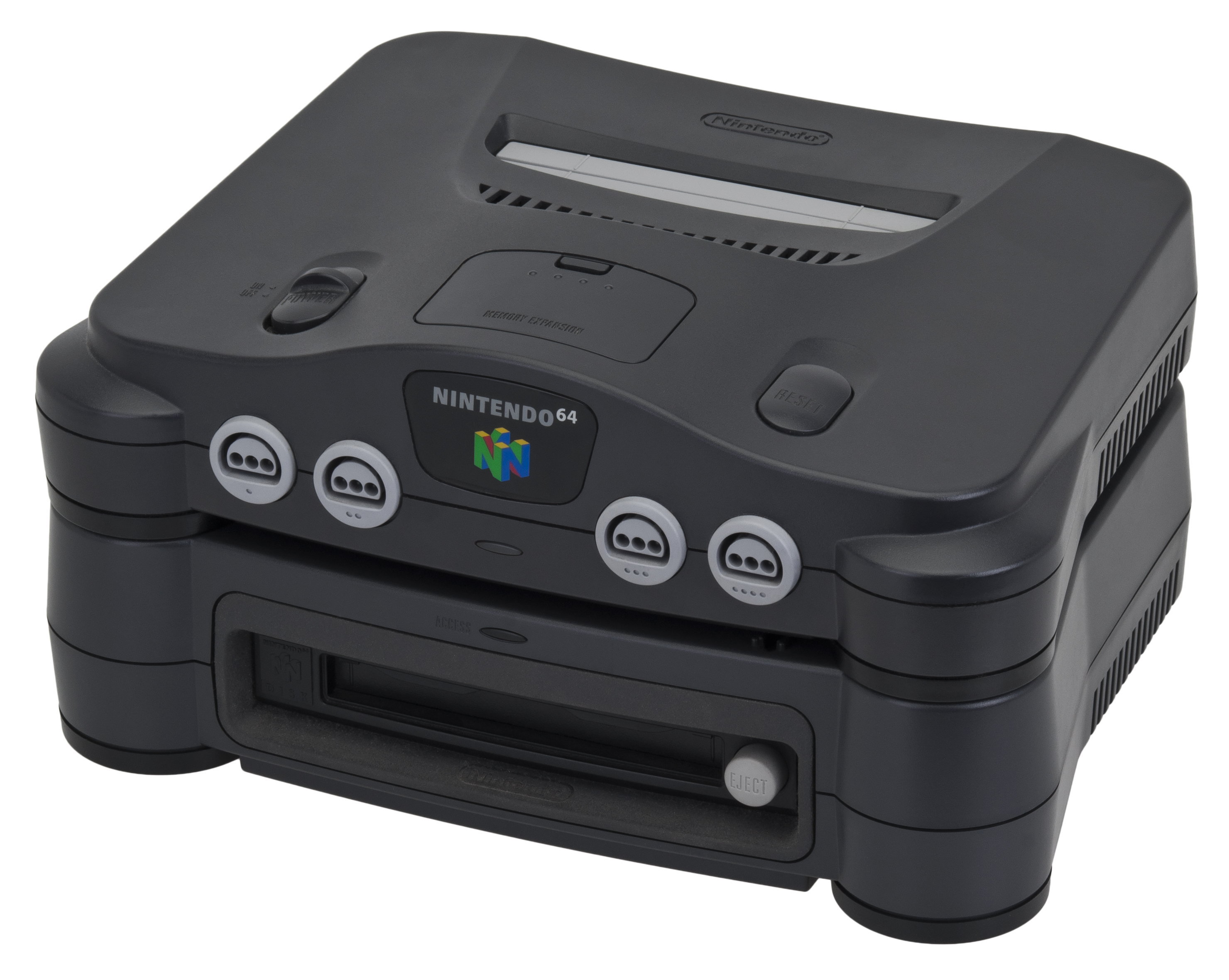
The Nintendo 64 with 64DD attached

The 64DD is a peripheral for the Nintendo 64, released only in Japan, and designed in part to provision cartridge games with expansions on inexpensive 64 megabyte floppy disks. The F-Zero X Expansion Kit is the 64DD's only expansion disk, released on April 21, 2000, in Japan. It adds 12 new tracks spread across two cups, a machine creator, a course editor, and new stereophonic soundtracks. In addition to these two new cups, players can create a custom "Edit Cup". The disk can save up to 100 tracks and up to 3 ghost data per course. IGN singled out the course editor as the Expansion Kit's strongest feature because the designers used a similar tool in-house for the original circuits. The machine creator's variety of options on pre-existing parts can be used to balance the creations' settings and performance abilities, and name the machine. The course editor allows the player to design racing circuits with detailed tracks. Using a cursor, the player can determine the basic layout, and draw curves and hills. The player can add half pipes, cylinders, and numerous road surfaces, such as slip zones. The player can test the creation at any time and run practice laps.

The Expansion Kit disk requires the cartridge, which was programmed with "64DD hooks" to detect the 64DD and expansion disk. This offers the possibility of many disk-based expansion pack features such as track editors or course updates, but no more were made, and this one was not utilized outside Japan due to the 64DD's commercial failure.

== Reception ==
Reception

Aggregate scores
Aggregator	Score
GameRankings	87.61%
Metacritic	85/100

Review scores
Publication	Score
AllGame	4/5
Edge	8/10
Electronic Gaming Monthly	9/10
GamePro	4.5/5
GameSpot	7.5/10
IGN	9.1/10
N64 Magazine	91% (JP); 91% (UK)
Next Generation	5/5
Nintendo Life	8.7/10
The Electric Playground	8.5/10

Award
Publication	Award
Electronic Gaming Monthly	Game of the Month

Critical reception of F-Zero X was overall positive. It has an aggregate average of 87.61% based on 15 reviews at GameRankings, and a metascore of 85 at Metacritic. Critics generally praised its fast gameplay, abundance of courses and vehicles, keeping a high framerate with up to thirty racers on screen at the same time, and track design. However, the lack of graphical detail has been widely criticized. Peer Schneider of IGN described the gameplay as "god-like", "hair-splitting" speed and said it rivaled its predecessor Wave Race 64 with its "perfectly fine-tuned controls and a fresh approach to racing". F-Zero X received the Game of the Month award for November 1998 from Electronic Gaming Monthly. An editor stated that "the graphics may be simple, but they're smooth and the action is fast". Next Generation stated: "From the rocking guitar tunes (courtesy of the same composer who created the original's music) to the insanely addictive Grand Prix races, the game is a blast."

Allgame described the graphical detail as "certainly not up to Nintendo's usual standards". GameSpot criticized the low polygon count on the vehicles "particularly uninspiring" and saying that the "track detail is also very limited, giving the track a spartan feel to it". Although the optimizations are strict, critics exalted the steady rate of 60 frames per second, which some thought made up for the lack of graphical detail with little room for improvement. The Electric Playground found the framerate to give "the game a major boost in the feel department [making it] seem like your vehicle is bursting through the sound barrier". According to GameSpot, F-Zero X became the first racing game to run at 60 frames per second with up to 30 vehicles on screen at the same time, but in order to keep the frame rate, polygon counts on the vehicles, textures and track detail are sacrificed.

EGM considered the music "really good with some excellent remixes of the old F-Zero tunes", and CVG called the music dreadful. The Electric Playground said it goes hand-in-hand to the simulation of speed, but that "I wouldn't in a million years buy music like this to listen to". GameSpot's retrospective review gave it 6.5/10, calling it "the black sheep of the series" when compared with the other F-Zero games in "visual style and technical flair". IGN described it as an exceptional update to the original game that "only suffers under its generic look". Peer Schneider believed that unlike the original, it "is not about showing off graphics or sound capabilities—it's all about gameplay". In 2009, Official Nintendo Magazine named it the 39th-greatest Nintendo game.

Nintendo sold 383,642 copies in North America and 97,684 copies in Japan. In its first week of sale in Japan, 56,457 copies were sold, but only about one fifth of that in the following week reportedly due to the Nintendo 64 having had a small dedicated fanbase there. F-Zero X was named as a finalist by the Academy of Interactive Arts & Sciences for "Console Racing Game of the Year" during the 2nd Annual Interactive Achievement Awards.
