= Nintendo Technology Development Division =

Nintendo's hardware development division

Nintendo Technology Development

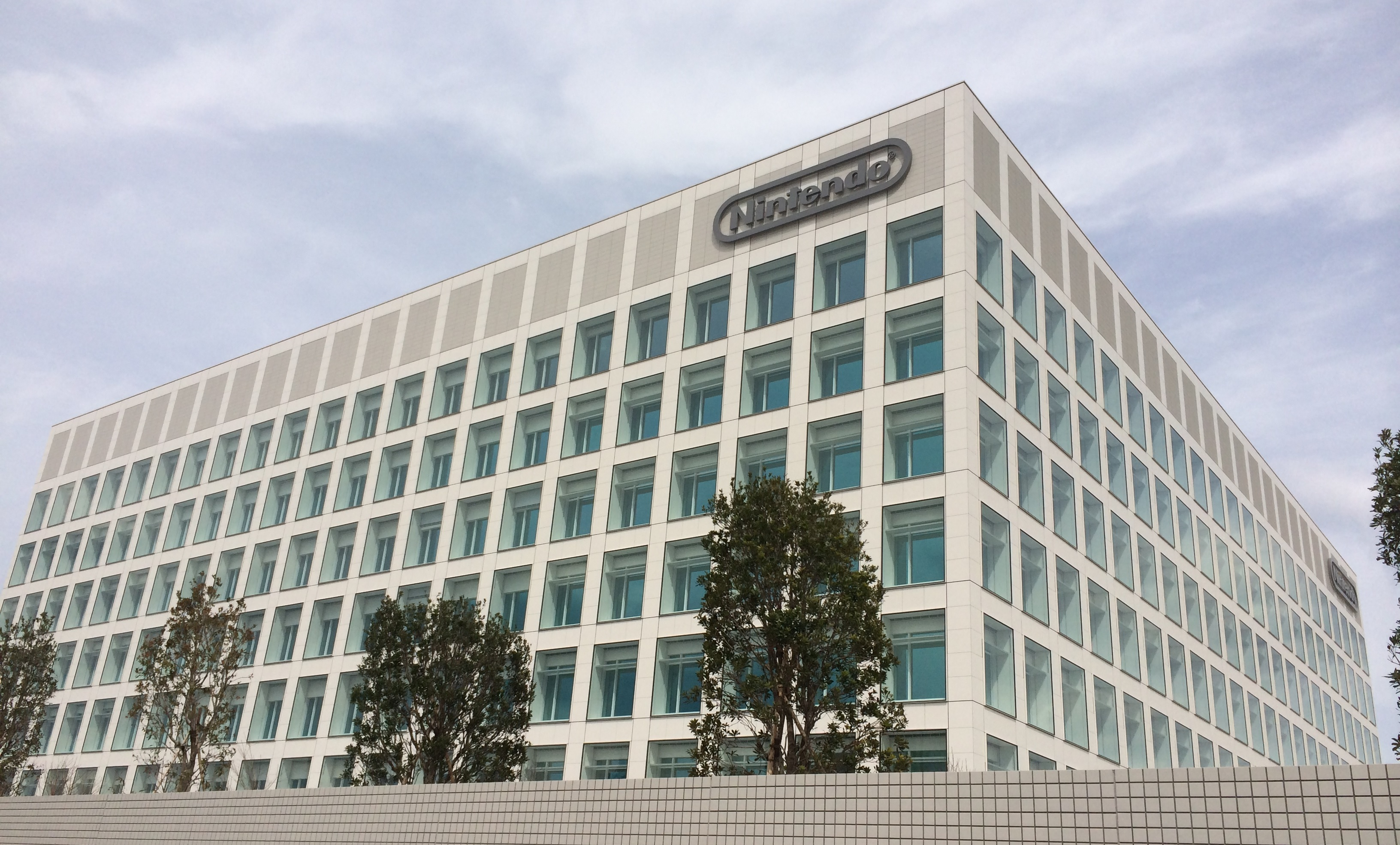
- Exterior of the Nintendo Development Center in Kyoto, Japan
- Native name: 任天堂技術開発本部
- Romanized name: Nintendō Gijutsu Kaihatsu Honbu
- Formerly: Nintendo Platform Technology Development Division
- Type: Division
- Industry: Video games
- Predecessors: Nintendo IRD; Nintendo SDD
- Founded: September 16, 2015; 11 years ago
- Headquarters: Kyoto, Japan
- Key people: Senior General Manager; Ko Shiota; General Manager; Tetsuya Sasaki; Deputy General Managers; Kiyoshi Mizuki; Takeshi Shimada; Toru Yamashita
- Parent: Nintendo

Nintendo Technology Development Division, (Note: Japanese: 任天堂技術開発本部, Hepburn: Nintendō Gijutsu Kaihatsu Honbu) commonly abbreviated as Nintendo TDD, formerly named as Nintendo Platform Technology Development (Nintendo PTD), is the hardware development division within the Japanese video game company Nintendo. The division was created in September 2015 after the merger of Nintendo's Integrated Research & Development and System Development divisions.

== History ==
The Nintendo Technology Development division was created on September 16, 2015, as part of a company-wide organizational restructure that took place under Nintendo's then newly appointed president, Tatsumi Kimishima. The division was created after the merger of two Nintendo's divisions, the Integrated Research & Development (IRD), which specialized in hardware development, and System Development (SDD), which specialized in operating system development and its development environment and network services.

The new division assumed both of its predecessors' roles. Ko Shiota, formerly Deputy General Manager of the IRD division, serves as the General Manager, while Takeshi Shimada, formerly Deputy General Manager of the Software Environment Development Department of the SDD division, serves the same role.

The division was responsible for the development of the company's hybrid game console, the Nintendo Switch.

On April 27, 2017, following the retirement of general manager and long-time Nintendo hardware developer Genyo Takeda, Ko Shiota was appointed as his successor.

On April 13, 2018, Nintendo Entertainment Planning & Development general manager Shinya Takahashi revealed that Nintendo was working on a new hardware video game system. On January 16, 2025 the new console was revealed to be called the Nintendo Switch 2, releasing on June 5, 2025.

By 2023, the division's name was shortened to Nintendo Technology Development.

== Products developed ==
List of products developed by the Nintendo Technology Development division
Year	Name	Platform(s)	Ref.
2016	Pokémon Go Plus	Hardware	
2016	NES Classic Edition	Hardware	
2017	Nintendo Switch (Note: Includes Joy-Con)	Hardware	
2017	Nintendo Switch Pro Controller	Nintendo Switch	
2017	New Nintendo 2DS XL (Note: Includes New Nintendo 2DS XL stylus)	Hardware	
2017	Super NES Classic Edition	Hardware	
2017	Joy-Con AA Battery Pack	Nintendo Switch	
2018	Nintendo Labo (Note: Co-developed with Nintendo EPD)	Nintendo Switch	
2018	Poké Ball Plus	Hardware	
2019	Nintendo Switch Lite	Hardware	
2019	Ring-Con (Note: Developed for Ring Fit Adventure)	Hardware	
2019	Leg-Strap	Nintendo Switch	
2019	Nintendo Switch Stylus	Nintendo Switch	
2021	Nintendo Switch OLED Model	Hardware	
2023	Pokémon GO Plus +	Hardware	
2024	Alarmo	Hardware	
2025	Nintendo Switch 2 (Note: Includes Joy-Con 2)	Hardware	
2025	Nintendo Switch 2 Pro Controller	Nintendo Switch 2	
2025	Nintendo Switch 2 Camera	Nintendo Switch 2	
2026	Virtual Boy	Nintendo Switch 2	
