= Alarmo =

Digital alarm clock by Nintendo

Nintendo Sound Clock: Alarmo
- Graphic of the clock front, displaying a theme based on The Legend of Zelda: Breath of the Wild
- Developer: Nintendo TDD; Nintendo EPD
- Manufacturer: Nintendo
- Released: Nintendo stores and Nintendo Switch Online release; WW: October 9, 2024; AU: November 13, 2024; Wide release; WW: March 2025; MY: March 10, 2025; SG: March 10, 2025; TH: March 10, 2025; AU: March 13, 2025
- Introductory price: US$99.99; A$159.00; ¥12,980; £89.99; €99.99; RM516.00; S$159.00; ฿4,590
- Storage: 4 GB eMMC
- Display: 2.8-inch LCD 320 × 240 pixels
- Input: Confirm button & dial, back and notification buttons
- Connectivity: 2.4 GHz Wi-Fi, 24GHz mmWave Sensor
- Power: USB-C input (requires at least 7.5W of power); Non-removable CR2032 battery (clock memory)
- Current firmware: 4.0.0, as of May 19, 2026; 4 months ago
- Model Number: CLO-001
- Website: www.nintendo.com/us/store/products/nintendo-sound-clock-alarmo-121311

The Nintendo Sound Clock: Alarmo (Note: Japanese: ニンテンドーサウンドクロック アラーモ, Hepburn: Nintendō Saundo Kurokku Arāmo) is a digital alarm clock developed and produced by Nintendo. It was released exclusively at Nintendo stores and online for Nintendo Switch Online subscribers on October 10, 2024. The device widely released in stores in 2025.

== Features ==
The device consists of a 2.8″ LCD screen to display the time and other metrics, as well as a large light-up dial which can be used to navigate menus. As a "smart" alarm clock it has a 2.4 GHz Wi-Fi connectivity for firmware and content download. Unlike traditional alarm clocks, Alarmo uses a 24 GHz mmWave presence sensor to detect motion during sleep and waking up. The longer the user stays in bed without moving, the louder and more intense the sound of the alarm will become. Alarmo will play game sounds as the user starts to move around in bed, and will play a fanfare once they are out of bed completely. Additionally, the user can also view sleep records from the device and play ambient music at night while falling asleep.

=== Themes ===
Alarmo can be set to various game themes based on various Nintendo Switch titles, which will alter the display of the clock as well as the music and sounds that play. At launch, the clock featured five themes based on Nintendo Switch titles, with each theme containing 7 alarms. Additionally, the clock displays a render of a character from a chosen theme beneath the current time which moves to the left or right of the display depending on detected movements. Further themes have been added over time and can be installed wirelessly with a connected Nintendo account. As of June 10, 2026, 11 themes are available on the device.

Theme	Distribution date	Ref.
Super Mario Odyssey	October 9, 2024	
The Legend of Zelda: Breath of the Wild	October 9, 2024	
Splatoon 3	October 9, 2024	
Pikmin 4	October 9, 2024	
Ring Fit Adventure	October 9, 2024	
Mario Kart 8 Deluxe	December 11, 2024	
Super Mario Bros.	March 10, 2025	
Animal Crossing: New Horizons	May 22, 2025	
Kirby and the Forgotten Land	October 9, 2025	
Super Mario Bros. Wonder	March 26, 2026	
Donkey Kong Bananza	June 10, 2026	

== Development ==
Nintendo first announced their intentions to create a sleep-tracking device during a financial briefing in 2014, which was intended to mark their entry into the "quality of life" market. The device, which would have used sensors to track a user's sleeping habits similarly to Alarmo, was being developed in partnership with health company ResMed but had been put on hold indefinitely in 2016.

Alarmo was developed in house by Nintendo's motion sensor research team. As the device's sensors could detect motion without the use of a camera, it was thought that the technology would be appropriate for use in a bedroom. Earlier prototypes of Alarmo lacked any design elements or sounds from other Nintendo properties. One such prototype used an LED dot-matrix display instead of a screen, however, the development team believed that it would be harder to use.

== Release ==
The Alarmo was announced by Nintendo on October 9, 2024, and on the same day, it was released exclusively at Nintendo's official stores. It also became available to purchase online for Nintendo Switch Online subscribers. A wide release of the device was set for 2025. In Australia and New Zealand, a wide release was set for March 2025, and Nintendo Switch Online members could register for a chance to be able to pre-purchase the device early on November 13, 2024.

On October 10, 2024, Nintendo announced that, due to a large number of orders in Japan, they would no longer take new online orders in that region, and that the purchase method would be switching to a lottery-based system. The same day, the Alarmo was sold out at the Nintendo stores in New York City, Tokyo, Osaka, and Kyoto. One day later, Nintendo announced that the ability for Nintendo Switch Online members in Japan to register for a chance to purchase the device online, using the aforementioned lottery system, had begun.

2.0.0 Update

Nintendo released a major update for the Alarmo on October 9, 2024, the same date the device launched, bringing the version number to 2.0.0. It added new features, including Moderate Mode, and Movement records.

3.0.0 Update

Nintendo released a major update for the Alarmo on March 23, 2025, bringing the version number to 3.0.0. Several new features were introduced, such as setting different alarms for individual days, sleepy sounds now able to be adjusted to last in one minute increments from 1-60, scene previews, and checking the MAC address while offline, as well as general improvements like improved scanning and software stability.

4.0.0 Update

Nintendo released a major update for the Alarmo on May 19, 2026, bringing the version number to 4.0.0. The update revamped the alarm selection screen, making it easier to select an alarm. It also added a favorites list, which plays only scenes you favorite when selected. It also had general system stability improvements.

== Reception ==
Early reactions to Alarmo found the alarm clock to be a surprising and unusual product for Nintendo to reveal, especially surrounding speculation about the announcement of the then-unannounced Nintendo Switch 2. Critics noted the expensive price point of Alarmo when compared to a traditional clock, as well as some limitations of the device including a lack of support for some bed sizes and multiple people or pets in one bed.

Nintendo Life awarded the device a 7/10, describing it as "a fun little device that's easy to use and will absolutely appeal to Nintendo fans both young and old if you value fun and whimsy over accuracy." They found the lack of an included AC adapter to be an inconvenience, noting that an adapter felt necessary for an alarm clock. They described the setup process as "very easy and very Nintendo, meaning there's a sliver of fun to be had in what is otherwise a straightforward affair". However, they recommended that if the Alarmo was being purchased for a young child, an adult should likely set up the device beforehand, stating that "there's nothing particularly difficult here, but you do need to understand what type of bed is in use (single, double, king, etc) along with where the Alarmo will be placed in relation to the bed itself". They praised the sound quality, saying, "[...] the volume isn't going to compete with the likes of an Alexa or a Bose speaker, but it does the job considering how close you're likely to be when sleeping. You can easily turn the volume up or down with the dial from the main screen, and the quality remains crisp and clear even at maximum." The Verge praised the design of the clock but criticized the motion-tracking technology's limited functionality and the sleep sounds only lasting 10 minutes, saying, "It's first and foremost a $100 Nintendo-branded clock. It looks and sounds the part, which is to say, it's incredibly charming and nostalgic. But if you're looking for something to help you wake up better than a run-of-the-mill alarm or track your sleep more efficiently than an app on your phone, this isn't it. Turns out, even adorable Pikmin and Inklings can't change my mind about alarm clocks."

CNET's Scott Stein gave it a mostly positive review, calling it "a novelty clock, a fun musical gift for the room of a kid or a Nintendo superfan ... It's absolutely charming and fine, but it's not a drop-dead amazing thing either."
