= Pokémon: Let's Go, Pikachu! and Let's Go, Eevee! =

2018 video games

Pokémon: Let's Go, Pikachu!; Pokémon: Let's Go, Eevee!
- Left: Icon of Let's Go, Pikachu!, depicting the Pokémon Pikachu; Right: Icon of Let's Go, Eevee!, depicting the Pokémon Eevee
- Developer: Game Freak
- Publishers: JP: The Pokémon Company; WW: Nintendo
- Director: Junichi Masuda
- Producers: Shigeru Ohmori; Hitoshi Yamagami; Akira Kinashi; Mikiko Ohashi; Takanori Sowa; Shin Uwai
- Designer: Masafumi Saito
- Artist: Takao Unno
- Writers: Hitomi Sato; Ryota Muranaka
- Composer: Shota Kageyama
- Series: Pokémon
- Platform: Nintendo Switch
- Release: 16 November 2018
- Genre: Role-playing
- Modes: Single-player, multiplayer

Pokémon: Let's Go, Pikachu! (Note: Japanese: ポケットモンスター Let's Go! ピカチュウ, Hepburn: Poketto Monsutā Let's GO! Pikachū) and Pokémon: Let's Go, Eevee! (Note: Japanese: ポケットモンスター Let's Go! イーブイ, Hepburn: Poketto Monsutā Let's GO! Ībui) are 2018 role-playing video games developed by Game Freak and published by the Pokémon Company and Nintendo for the Nintendo Switch. The games are remakes of the 1998 Game Boy title Pokémon Yellow. Let's Go, Pikachu! and Let's Go, Eevee! are part of the seventh generation of the Pokémon video game series and are the first main series installments to be released for a home game console. They feature connectivity with the mobile game Pokémon Go and support an optional controller, the Poké Ball Plus.

Pokémon: Let's Go, Pikachu! and Let's Go, Eevee! were first announced at a Japanese press conference in May 2018, with the intention for the games to cater to old fans as well as bring in newcomers to the series, resulting in a simpler gameplay that did away with elements like random wild battles and complex mechanics like breeding. They were also meant to appeal to a younger audience; for this reason, the games incorporate elements from the anime, similar to Pokémon Yellow. The games were released worldwide on 16 November 2018 and received generally favorable reviews from critics, with praise directed at the accessibility and charm, while criticism was directed toward the motion controls. The games have combined worldwide sales of over 15 million as of December 2022, making them one of the best-selling games for the system.

== Gameplay ==
A screenshot from the Nintendo Treehouse Live stream at E3 2018 depicting the player character moving through tall grass with visible Pokémon walking around the overworld

Pokémon: Let's Go, Pikachu! and Let's Go, Eevee! are set in the Kanto Region and include the original 151 Pokémon in addition to their respective Mega Evolved forms from Pokémon X, Y, Omega Ruby, and Alpha Sapphire and their Alolan Forms from Pokémon Sun and Moon. The game also features the Mythical Pokémon Meltan and Melmetal, which can be transferred from Pokémon GO.

Let's Go, Pikachu! and Let's Go, Eevee! feature common elements of the main series, such as battling non-player character Pokémon Trainers and Gym Leaders with caught Pokémon creatures. However, when facing wild Pokémon, instead of battling them with the traditional battle system like in past games, the catching of Pokémon uses a system that is reminiscent of the mobile spin-off game Pokémon Go. By using the motion controls of the Joy-Con controller or Poké Ball Plus peripheral, players can throw berries to pacify a Pokémon or Poké Balls to attempt to capture it. The action can also be performed with a button press when the Joy-Con controllers are docked to the console or in handheld mode, but this still requires using motion controls to aim. If a player uses motion controls, the catching of Pokémon is based on the player's timing rather than accuracy. Although it is possible to miss a throw, the ball is almost guaranteed to make contact with the Pokémon. One notable difference in Let's Go, Pikachu! and Let's Go, Eevee! is that wild Pokémon are visible from the overworld, rather than as random encounters in grass or in caves like in previous main series Pokémon role-playing games. To start an encounter with a wild Pokémon, the player must simply approach the Pokémon in the environment.

The games' control scheme is designed to only require one Joy-Con per player, and the games support cooperative multiplayer. If another player shakes a second Joy-Con, they can join the current player and are able to participate in battles with Pokémon Trainers and wild Pokémon encounters, allowing them to aid in the catching of wild Pokémon. When playing multiplayer, Trainer battles become battles of two Pokémon against one, and in wild encounters, there is the possibility for each player to throw a Poké Ball at the same time, doubling the chances of capturing the Pokémon.

Depending on the version, players start with either a Pikachu (voiced by Ikue Ōtani) or an Eevee (voiced by Aoi Yūki), which sits on the player character's shoulder in the overworld. This mechanic is similar to the "walking Pokémon" mechanic first introduced in Pokémon Yellow, in which Pikachu follows behind the player character throughout the game. The player's partner Pokémon wiggles its tail when they are near a hidden item, and it can be dressed up for further customization. Similarly to Pokémon HeartGold and SoulSilver, players may also choose a Pokémon to follow them, and some larger Pokémon can also be ridden, a mechanic first seen in Pokémon X and Y and later expanded on in Sun and Moon.

Since Pokémon X and Y, experience points are rewarded to Pokémon by not only defeating opponent Pokémon but also catching wild Pokémon. However, in Let's Go, Pikachu! and Let's Go, Eevee!, experience points rewarded by catching wild Pokémon are affected by various multiplier bonuses depending on the timing of the throw and the technique used to throw the Poké Ball, such as performing an overarm or underarm throw. The games also introduce new items called "candies", which are used to power up a Pokémon's statistics, such as hit points (HP), Attack, Defense, Special Attack, Special Defense, and Speed. Different types of candies are awarded to players who transfer their Pokémon to Professor Oak via an in-game storage box. "Combat Power" (CP) also returns from Pokémon Go.

The evolution mechanic from previous games returns in Let's Go, Pikachu! and Let's Go, Eevee! However, as with Pokémon Yellow, the player's starting Pikachu or Eevee cannot evolve; only other Pokémon that the player has caught, including ones of the same species as the partner Pokémon.

Some features, like Pokémon breeding and HMs, are absent from the games.

=== Connectivity ===
Players can trade Pokémon and battle other players both locally and online, with online features being simplified in comparison with previous games. Some features—including the Global Trade System, Wonder Trade, and Battle Spot—are absent from Let's Go, Pikachu! and Let's Go, Eevee!. In order to connect with others to trade or battle online, players must use a code composed of three Pokémon glyphs, selected from a total of eight. When two players enter the same code, they are connected to trade Pokémon with or battle each other. A subscription to the Nintendo Switch Online service is required to use online functionality.

Although Let's Go, Pikachu! and Let's Go, Eevee! feature integration with Pokémon Go, this is optional. Players can transfer the original first generation Pokémon and their respective Alolan Forms from Pokémon Go to Let's Go, Pikachu! or Let's Go, Eevee!. They then appear at the Go Park—an in-game location where the player can explore and interact with or catch Pokémon that are walking around. Pokémon with higher CP or levels are harder to catch, in that the catch attempt has a higher chance of failing. Users are also able to exchange gifts between Pokémon Go and Let's Go, Pikachu! or Let's Go, Eevee!.

The games also feature connectivity with the Pokémon Home online cloud storage app, allowing for management of Pokémon between the two games as well as transferring supported species into Pokémon Sword and Shield, Pokémon Brilliant Diamond and Shining Pearl, Pokémon Legends: Arceus, Pokémon Scarlet and Violet, and Pokémon Legends: Z-A, as well as usage within Pokémon Champions, though transferring them into later installments in the series or using them in Champions renders them unable to return to Let's Go, Pikachu! or Let's Go, Eevee!.

=== Poké Ball Plus ===
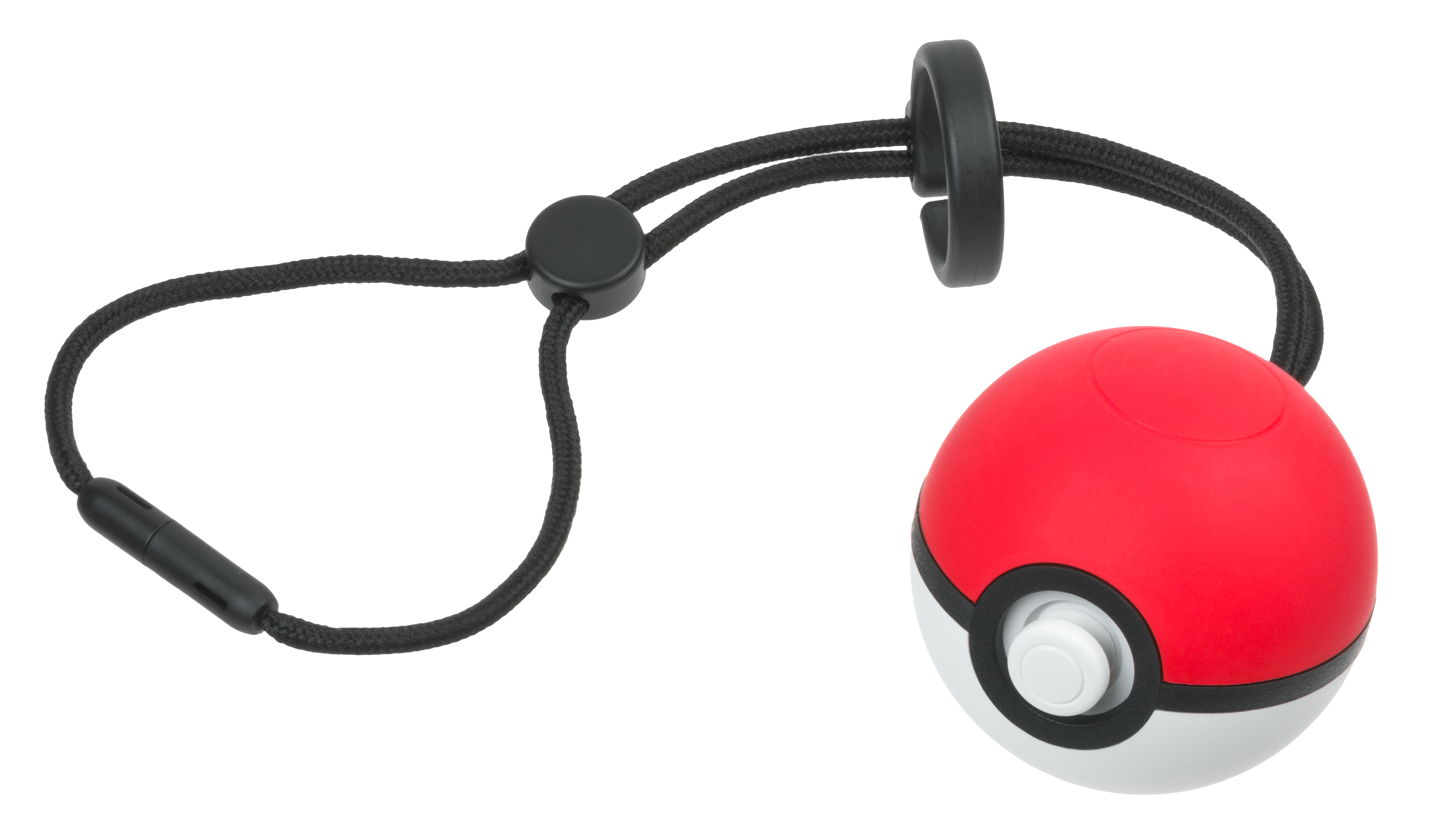
The Poké Ball Plus controller

The games support the Poké Ball Plus, an optional controller shaped like a Poké Ball which features an analog stick, motion control support, HD Rumble feedback, and lighting effects. The analog stick doubles as a capture button in case the player does not wish to use the motion controls. Pokémon can also be transferred to it, in a similar way to the Pokéwalker. During Nintendo's E3 2018 Nintendo Direct presentation on 12 June 2018, it was revealed that the Poké Ball Plus would come with a Mew that can be transferred to the games.

== Plot ==
The setting and story remain largely the same as Pokémon Yellow, complete with the inclusion of anime-exclusive characters.

The eight Gym Leaders and the members of the Elite Four return, as well as the antagonist faction Team Rocket, including Jessie, James and Meowth from the anime series. Unlike the anime series, Meowth cannot speak human language and is given his own Meowth cry. Players need all eight Gym Badges to get into the Pokémon League in the Indigo Plateau and challenge the Elite Four and the Pokémon League Champion.

== Development ==
Pokémon: Let's Go, Pikachu! and Let's Go, Eevee! were unveiled during a press conference in Japan on 30 May 2018. They are primarily aimed toward a younger audience and those who are new to the Pokémon franchise. At the time of announcement game director Junichi Masuda mentioned that the games had been in development for around two years. Masuda also stated that he considered the games to be remakes of Pokémon Yellow, explaining that Yellow "resonated" best with younger players because it incorporated elements from the Pokémon anime television series. According to Masuda, he decided to make Eevee the mascot of the other game due to its popularity and abundance of fan art.

== Release ==
The games were released internationally on 16 November 2018. Bundles of the games with the Poké Ball Plus controller were announced, as well as a Nintendo Switch console bundle, including the games, brown and yellow colored Joy-Con, and a dock with artwork of Eevee and Pikachu. On 21 September 2018, Amazon began offering pre-orders for the Let's Go, Pikachu! and Let's Go, Eevee! Switch bundle.

== Reception ==
Reception

Aggregate scores
Aggregator	Score
Metacritic	79/100 (Let's Go, Pikachu!); 80/100 (Let's Go, Eevee!)
OpenCritic	80% recommend

Review scores
Publication	Score
Electronic Gaming Monthly	8.5/10
Eurogamer	8/10
Famitsu	37/40
GamePro	85/100
GameSpot	8/10
GamesRadar+	4.5/5
IGN	8.3/10
Nintendo Life	8/10
USgamer	4/5
The Daily Telegraph	4/5

Pokémon: Let's Go, Pikachu! and Let's Go, Eevee! received "generally favorable reviews" from critics, according to review aggregator website Metacritic. Fellow review aggregator OpenCritic assessed that the games received strong approval, being recommended by 80% of critics. Critics applauded the gameplay, nostalgia, accessibility to new players, and charm of the games, while criticising its motion controls.

IGN's Miranda Sanchez praised the game's catching mechanic which drew inspiration from the gameplay of Pokémon Go. She mentioned that she could "prioritize catching the Pokémon I actually wanted" and avoiding undesired ones thanks to the games' new overworld view of the Pokémon.

The implementation of the motion controls has been criticized by some sources for reducing accessibility to some players with fine-motor or physical disabilities.

=== Sales ===
In Japan, Let's Go, Pikachu! and Let's Go, Eevee! topped the software sales chart and sold 661,240 physical retail units in their opening weekend, and were responsible for almost quadrupling Nintendo Switch hardware sales for the week. They remained at the top of the Japanese charts in their third week, bringing its physical retail sales to 1,012,247 units in Japan by 9 December 2018. By 16 December 2018, the games had sold 1,121,020 physical retail units in Japan. As of 6 January 2019, the games have sold 1,399,595 physical retail units in Japan.

The NPD reported the launch sales of Let's Go, Pikachu! and Let's Go, Eevee! in North America as being positive and described it as "the most important launch" of the year. On streaming site Twitch, the games were the most-viewed titles on launch day with 125,457 viewers, above Fortnite. Within ten days of release, the games sold over 1.5 million units in the United States, as of 26 November 2018. As of 18 December 2018, the games had sold 2 million units in the US. They had the second highest launch month ever in dollar sales for the franchise in the US, behind only Pokémon Stadium.

In the United Kingdom, Let's Go, Pikachu! and Let's Go, Eevee! launched with 116,000 physical retail sales in their opening weekend, becoming the top-selling games of the week, despite competition from new releases such as Spyro Reignited Trilogy, Fallout 76 and Hitman 2. They also had a positive impact on Switch hardware sales, which in turn boosted sales of other Switch games including several Mario games, The Legend of Zelda: Breath of the Wild and Just Dance 2019. Individually, Let's Go, Pikachu! debuted at third place in the UK's all-format sales charts, and Let's Go, Eevee! placed sixth on the same chart. UK sales were down 60% on the sales of Pokémon Sun and Moon, the preceding games in the franchise, due to the Switch having a smaller install base than the Nintendo 3DS and stock problems. The games sold over 338,270 physical retail units in 2018, making them the year's eleventh best-selling retail games in the UK.

On 22 November 2018, The Pokémon Company announced that the games had sold over 3 million units worldwide in their first week on sale, making them the fastest-selling Nintendo Switch titles. As of 30 September 2023, total worldwide sales have reached 15.07 million copies.

=== Awards ===
Year	Award	Category	Result	Ref.
2018	Game Critics Awards	Best RPG	Nominated	
2018	Game Critics Awards	Best Family/Social Game	Nominated	
2018	Australian Games Awards	Family/Kids Title of the Year	Nominated	
2018	Australian Games Awards	RPG of the Year	Nominated	
2019	New York Game Awards	Central Park Children's Zoo Award for Best Kids Game	Nominated	
2019	National Academy of Video Game Trade Reviewers Awards	Game, Classic Revival	Nominated	
2019	15th British Academy Games Awards	Family	Nominated	
2019	Famitsu Awards	Excellence Prize	Won	
2019	Italian Video Game Awards	People's Choice	Nominated	
2019	Golden Joystick Awards	Nintendo Game of the Year	Nominated	

== See also ==
- Pokémon FireRed and LeafGreen
- Pokémon Yellow
