= Poké Ball Plus =

Video game controller

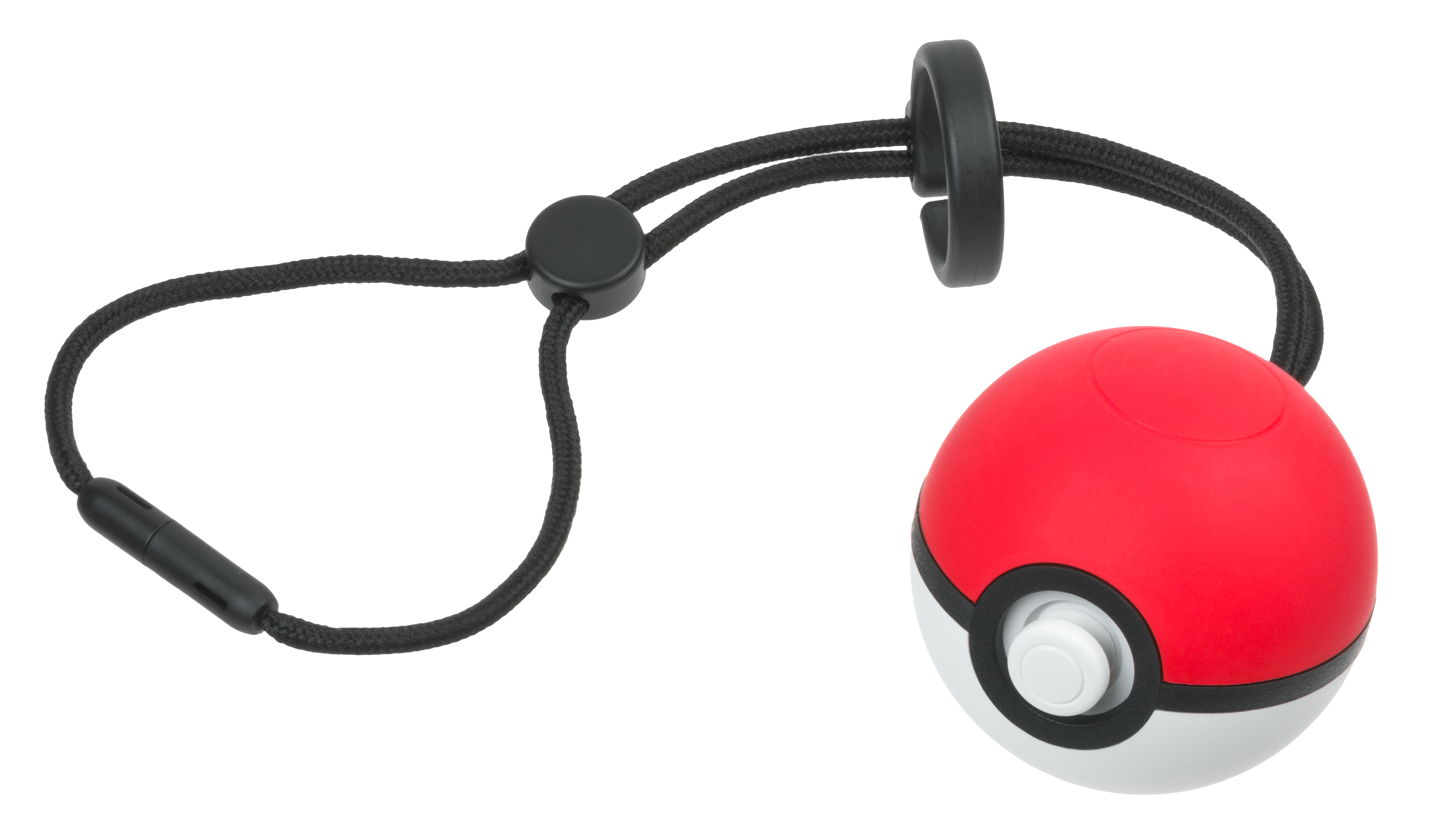
- Developer: Nintendo Platform Technology Development
- Manufacturer: Nintendo
- Product family: Nintendo Switch; Nintendo Switch 2
- Type: Game controllers
- Generation: Eighth
- Released: WW: November 16, 2018
- Lifespan: 2018–present
- Power: Internal 220mAh rechargeable battery (non-removable)
- Weight: 65g
- Website: media.nintendo.com/pokeballplus/

The Poké Ball Plus is a video game controller for the Nintendo Switch and Nintendo Switch 2. It was developed and manufactured by Nintendo and released on November 16, 2018. It is based on the Poké Ball, a fictional device integral to the Pokémon media franchise. The controller is compatible with the video games Pokémon GO, Pokémon: Let's Go, Pikachu!, Pokémon: Let's Go, Eevee!, and Pokémon Sword and Shield. It substitutes the ball's button for an analog stick that can be pressed inwards to function as the A button, while a hidden button atop the ball acts as the B button. It also contains motion sensors to simulate throwing the ball, HD Rumble feedback, and LEDs and speakers to mimic a Pokémon being caught. It has further functionality as a Pokémon GO Plus, allowing players to catch Pokémon without using their phone directly. The mythical Pokémon Mew is included digitally with every Poké Ball Plus. The controller received positive reviews from critics, who highly recommended it to fans of the franchise due to its high quality, despite its lack of functionality elsewhere.

== Features ==
Each controller contains an accelerometer, gyro sensor, HD Rumble, speakers, and LEDs. They can function in a similar manner to a Joy-Con while being used with the Nintendo Switch games.

While it can be used as a full one-handed controller in Let's Go, its compatibility with Sword and Shield is more limited, with the player able to use it to register Mew, which can also be done in the former. The controller, however, is only able to dispense one Mew per controller. It is also able to load Pokémon into it and take them for a walk to earn bonus item rewards.

== Release ==
The Poké Ball Plus was initially priced at $50 USD, and bundled with copies of Let's Go for $100 USD. It later dropped to a price of $40 USD for a limited time.

== Reception ==
Damien McFerran of Nintendo Life rated the Poké Ball Plus 7/10 stars, calling it part of Nintendo's unique legacy to link players and software in new and lucrative ways, citing the DK Bongos as another example. Calling it one of the most perfect realizations of any Pokémon-based device, he said that it made players really feel like a trainer. However, he criticized its lack of precision compared to the Switch's Joy-Con controls, saying that even a single Joy-Con was more precise, and said it was only truly useful if players were also using it for Pokémon GO.

Sam Loveridge of GamesRadar+ rated the controller 4.5/5 stars, calling it a "must-buy" for fans, and saying that it was everything his "inner child" imagined it would be. He praised its matte finish, calling it a "tactile joy". Allegra Frank of Polygon called the controller "charming", but "not as fun as it looks", calling its inputs "awkward" and "limited", and remarking on its small size. She nevertheless called the idea "rad", and the controller's design "very, very pretty".
