= Nintendo System Development =

Defunct R&D division of Nintendo

Nintendo System Development Division
- Native name: 任天堂企画開発本部
- Romanized name: Nintendō Kikaku Kaihatsu Honbu
- Formerly: Nintendo Network Business & Development; Nintendo Network Service Development; Nintendo Special Planning & Development
- Type: Division
- Industry: Video games
- Founded: 1997; 29 years ago (as Nintendo Special Planning & Development)
- Defunct: September 16, 2015
- Fate: Merged with Nintendo Integrated Research & Development and folded into Nintendo Technology Development Division
- Successor: Nintendo Platform Technology Development
- Headquarters: Kyoto, Japan
- Key people: Masaru Shimomura (General Manager)
- Products: Nintendo Network services Various video game titles and peripherals
- Number of employees: ≈30
- Parent: Nintendo
- Divisions: Network Development & Operations; Software Environment Development

Nintendo System Development Division, (Note: Japanese: 任天堂企画開発本部, Hepburn: Nintendō Shisutemu Kaihatsu Honbu) commonly abbreviated as Nintendo SDD and formerly known as Nintendo Network Business & Development (NBD), Nintendo Network Service Development (NSD), and Nintendo Special Planning & Development (SPD), was a division of Nintendo. It was located in the Nintendo Research Institute in Kyoto, Japan, until it moved to the Nintendo Development Center, also in Kyoto. The division consisted of a single development team that focused on software and peripheral development. SDD was composed of two development departments with different duties: the Network Development & Operations Department, which handled Nintendo Network service programming, in cooperation with Nintendo Network Service Database, and the Software Environment Development Department, which developed Software Development Kits (SDKs), among other technologies.

On September 16, 2015, SDD merged with Nintendo Integrated Research & Development (IRD), becoming Nintendo Platform Technology Development.

== History ==
The Nintendo Special Planning & Development team originated from former Nintendo R&D2 staff, and was mainly responsible for ports and in-house development for low profile hardware, such as the Pokémon Mini and the Super Famicom Satellaview service. Most of the software developed by this group has remained domestic having hardly ever seen release outside Japan. The original general manager, Satoshi Yamato, produced all of the software which included in-house software for the Game Boy Advance, and the e-Reader. The group also created mechanical devices and peripherals like the Pokéwalker and Pokémotion. The last general manager, Masaru Shimomura described the Mechanical Design Group as a small creative unit that has a hardware and a software team working jointly together to create innovative products.

In 2008, Nintendo SPD was renamed to Nintendo Network Service Development, creating the Network Planning Group alongside it. In 2011, the Nintendo NSD development team was consolidated into a division and was renamed to Nintendo Network Business & Development, appointing Masaru Shimomura as manager. Following the change, the Nintendo Network Business Department was created. The department contained two different groups: the former Mechanical Design Group, which was responsible for developing software titles and peripherals, as well the Network Software Development Group, which was responsible for developing Nintendo Network services. In 2012, the Software Environment Development Department was created, which developed Software Development Kits (SDKs), among experimental technologies.

In 2013, the division was renamed to Nintendo System Development Division. Nintendo consolidated the Nintendo Network Business Department into a department named Network Development & Operations Department which was responsible for handling Nintendo Network service programming in cooperation with Nintendo Network Service Database. With the change, the Mechanical Design Group was dissolved.

On September 16, 2015, SDD merged with Nintendo Integrated Research & Development (IRD), becoming the Nintendo Platform Technology Development.

== Network Operations & Development Department ==
Deputy Manager: Kiyoshi Mizuki

The Network Operations & Development Department was responsible for developing Nintendo Network services, in cooperation with the Nintendo Network Service Database. The department had the Network Software Development Group.

List of software and online infrastructures developed by Nintendo SDD Network Operations & Development Department
Title	Type(s)	Platform(s)	Year	Producer(s)	Director(s)
Wii Shop Channel	Online distribution	Wii	2006	Masaru Shimomura	Kiyoshi Mizuki
Nintendo Channel	Online distribution	Wii	2006	Masaru Shimomura	Kiyoshi Mizuki
Nintendo DSi Shop	Online distribution	Nintendo DSi	2008	Masaru Shimomura	
Nintendo Zone	Network interface	Nintendo DS; Nintendo DSi	2009	Masaru Shimomura	
Friend List	Friends list	Nintendo 3DS	2011	Masaru Shimomura	Kiyoshi Mizuki
StreetPass	Network interface	Nintendo 3DS	2011	Masaru Shimomura	
Nintendo eShop	Online distribution	Nintendo 3DS	2011	Masaru Shimomura	Kazuto Nakaya
Nintendo Video	Video player	Nintendo 3DS	2011	Masaru Shimomura	
Nintendo Zone	Network interface	Nintendo 3DS	2011	Masaru Shimomura	Fumihiko Tamiya
Swapnote Nintendo Letter Box ^{PAL}	Messaging	Nintendo 3DS	2011	Kiyoshi Mizuki; Masaru Shimomura	Daiji Imai
WaraWara Plaza (Note: Co-developed by Nintendo Entertainment Analysis & Development (EAD) and Nintendo Software Planning & Development (SPD).)	Operating system (Miiverse)	Wii U	2012	Kiyoshi Mizuki; Katsuya Eguchi (Nintendo EAD); Kouichi Kawamoto (Nintendo SPD)	Hisashi Nogami (Nintendo EAD)
Miiverse (Note: Co-developed by Hatena, Nintendo Network Service Database (NSD) and Denyusha.)	Social network	Wii U	2012	Kiyoshi Mizuki; Junya Kondo (Hatena); Yusuke Beppu (Nintendo NSD)	Hideto Yuzawa; Yoshiomi Kurisu (Hatena)
Nintendo Network ID		Wii U	2012		
Wii U Chat (Note: Co-developed by Nintendo European Research & Development (NERD), Nintendo Technology Development (NTD) and Vidyo.)	Online chat	Wii U	2012		Fumihiko Tamiya
Nintendo eShop	Online distribution	Wii U	2012	Kiyoshi Mizuki	Kazuto Nakaya
Miiverse	Social network	Web browser	2013	Kiyoshi Mizuki; Junya Kondo (Hatena); Yusuke Beppu (Nintendo NSD)	Hideto Yuzawa; Yoshiomi Kurisu (Hatena)
StreetPass Relay	Network interface	Nintendo 3DS	2013	Kiyoshi Mizuki	Masatoshi Yamazaki
Miiverse	Social network	Nintendo 3DS	2013	Kiyoshi Mizuki; Junya Kondo (Hatena); Yusuke Beppu (Nintendo NSD)	Hideto Yuzawa; Yoshiomi Kurisu (Hatena)

== Software Environment Development Department ==
Deputy Manager/Producer: Takeshi Shimada

The Software Environment Development Department was responsible for developing online communication infrastructures and middleware tools. The department had the Application Group.

List of online infrastructures developed by Nintendo SDD Software Environment Development Department
Title	Genre(s)	Platform(s)	Year	Producer(s)	Director(s)
WiiConnect24		Wii	2006		
Wii system software		Wii	2006		
Nintendo DSi Browser		Nintendo DSi	2009		
Download Play		Nintendo 3DS	2011		
Nintendo eShop		Nintendo 3DS	2011		
Mario Kart 7		Nintendo 3DS	2011		
Kid Icarus: Uprising		Nintendo 3DS	2012		
Nintendo Land		Wii U	2012		
StreetPass Relay		Nintendo 3DS	2013		
Tomodachi Life		Nintendo 3DS	2013		
Mario Kart 8		Wii U	2014		

=== Mechanical Design Group ===
The Mechanical Design Group was responsible for developing software titles and peripherals for Nintendo video game consoles, until it was dissolved in 2013.

Title	Year	Platform(s)	Director	Producer
Satellaview	1995	Hardware	Masaru Shimomura	Satoshi Yamato
BS Super Mario USA Power Challenge	1996	Satellaview	Toshiaki Suzuki	Satoshi Yamato
BS Marvelous Time Athletics	1996	Satellaview	Eiji Aonuma	Satoshi Yamato
BS Marvelous Camp Arnold	1996	Satellaview	Yoshinori Tsuchiyama	Satoshi Yamato
Nintendo Power (cartridge)	1996	SNES; GB		
BS F-Zero Grand Prix	1997	Satellaview	Toshiaki Suzuki	Satoshi Yamato
Excitebike: Super Mario Cup Battle	1997	Satellaview	Yoshinori Tsuchiyama	Satoshi Yamato
Pokémon Pikachu	1998	Hardware		
Pokémon Pikachu 2 GS	1999	Hardware		
Pocket Hello Kitty	1999	Hardware		
Mobile Adapter GB	2001	Hardware	Masaru Shimomura	Satoshi Yamato
Pokémon Party Mini	2001	Pokémon Mini	Shinya Kawada	Satoshi Yamato
Pokémon Pinball Mini	2001	Pokémon Mini	Yoshikazu Mori	Satoshi Yamato
Sakura Momoko no Ukiuki Carnival	2002	GBA	Toru Osawa	Satoshi Yamato
Pokémon Race Mini	2002	Pokémon Mini	Shinya Kawada	Satoshi Yamato
Pokémon Shock Tetris	2002	Pokémon Mini	Shinya Kawada	Satoshi Yamato
Pokémotion	2003	Hardware	Shinya Kawada	Satoshi Yamato
Mario Party-e	2002	e-Reader	Toru Osawa	Satoshi Yamato
Game Boy Advance Wireless Adapter	2004	GBA		
Slide Adventure MAGKID	2007	NDS	Kazunobu Shimizu	Shinya Kawada
Personal Trainer: Walking	2008	NDS	Naoya Morimura	Shinya Kawada
Cooking Guide: Can't Decide What to Eat?	2008	NDS	Hirotaka Watanabe	Yoshinori Tsuchiyama
Pokéwalker	2009	Hardware	Masaru Shimomura	Junichi Masuda; Hitoshi Yamagami

Discography Credits
