= Motion controller =

Video game controller that tracks motions

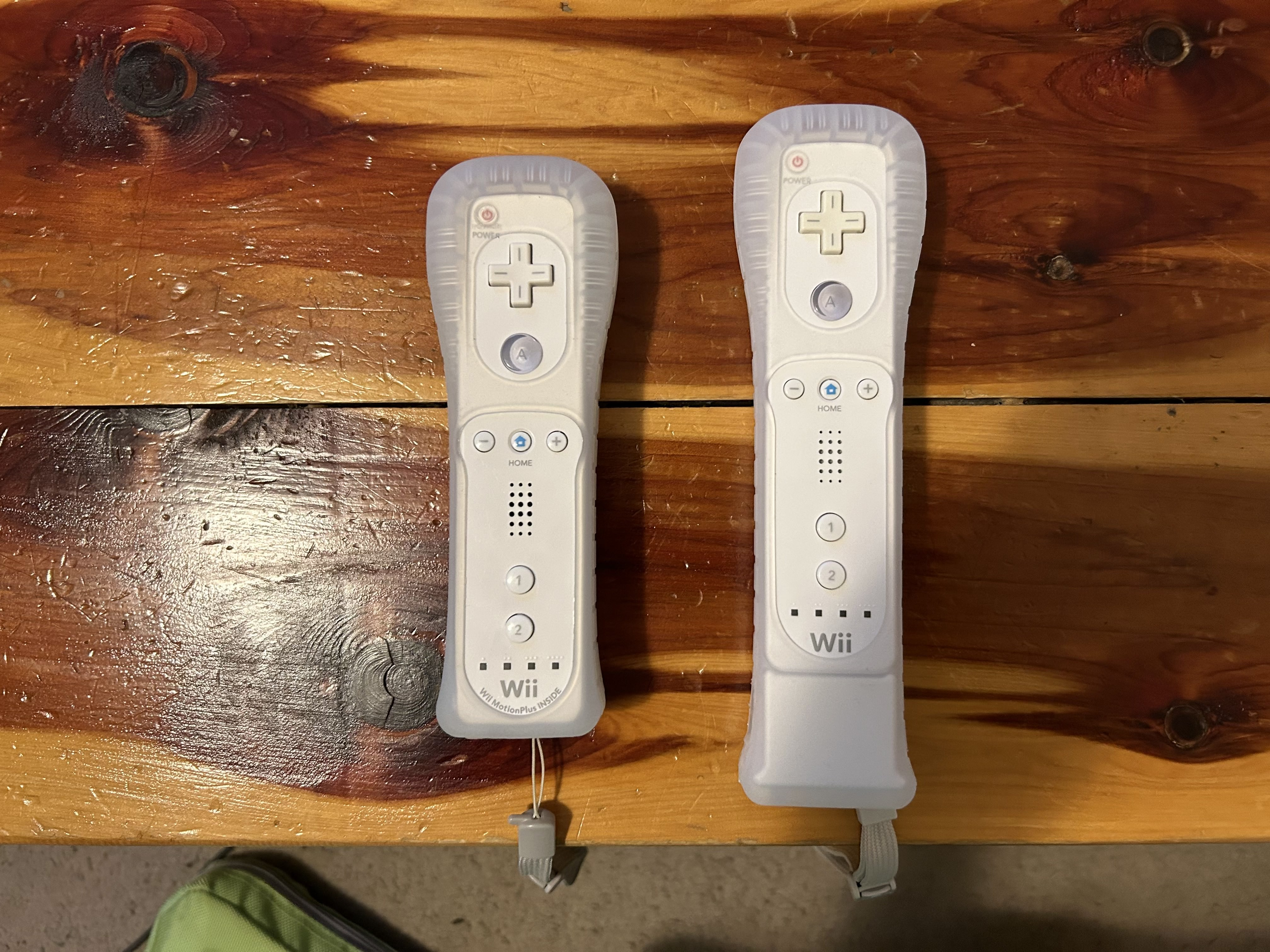
The Wii Remote Plus and Wii Remote with Motion Plus accessory

In computing, a motion controller is a type of input device that uses accelerometers, gyroscopes, cameras, or other sensors to track motion.

Motion controllers see use as game controllers, for virtual reality and other simulation purposes, and as pointing devices for smart TVs and Personal computers.

Many of the technologies needed for motion controllers are often used together in smartphones to provide a variety of functions, including for mobile applications to use them as motion controllers.

== Technologies ==
Motion controllers have used a variety of different sensors in different combinations to detect and measure movements, sometimes as separate inputs and sometimes together to provide a more precise or more reliable input. In modern devices most of the sensors are specialized integrated circuits. The following items are examples of current and historical methods of tracking motion.

=== Inertial Motion Sensors ===
Inertial Measurement Units (IMUs) are used to detect the rate of change in rotation using gyroscopes and change in speed using accelerometers. These are often found together on the same integrated circuit and can be used together to provide six degrees of freedom (6DOF) tracking.

=== Cameras ===
Image sensors are used in conjunction with computer vision and are placed in locations such as on handheld or worn devices or in the environment to detect the relative locations of other devices and the environment, or to detect the movements of any or all parts of a user's body. They may be used in combination with paired light emitters that are tracked directly when seen by the camera, or indirectly through reflections of infrared light.

=== Magnetometer ===
A magnetic field sensor in a device may be used to detect the direction of the earth's magnetic field, or the direction to a nearby base station.

=== Mechanical ===
Mechanical sensing methods using potentiometers, Hall-effect sensors, and incremental encoders have historically seen use as the basis for motion tracking but they have since mostly been replaced for that purpose by MEMS and other types of integrated circuit technologies. These sensors are used to track mechanical connections between a control element and a static object such as an arcade cabinet.

Weighing scales using load cells have been used to detect balance changes and other body movements through changes in weight distribution and momentary fluctuation in measured weight.

Unrelated to their use in motion tracking, mechanical sensors continue to see much use in joysticks and other controls that are found on motion controllers and other input devices.

=== Other ===
Ultrasonic triangulation and mercury switches were seen in optional peripherals for home video game consoles in the 1980s.

== History ==
Early uses of motion controllers included the Sega AM2 arcade game Hang-On, which was controlled using a video game arcade cabinet resembling a motorbike, which the player moved with their body. This began the "Taikan" trend, the use of motion-controlled hydraulic arcade cabinets in many arcade games of the late 1980s, two decades before motion controls became popular on video game consoles.

The Sega VR headset was an early unreleased VR device with built-in motion tracking, first announced in 1991. Its sensors tracked the player's movement and head position. Microsoft's first controller with tilt detection was the Sidewinder Freestyle Pro for PC. Released in 1998, it could map the tilting of the controller to two analog axes, essentially replicating an analog joystick. Another early example is the 2000 light gun shooter arcade game Police 911, which used motion tracking technology to detect the player's movements, which are reflected by the player character within the game. The Atari Mindlink was an early proposed motion controller for the Atari 2600, which measured the movement of the user's eyebrows with a fitted headband.

The Sega Activator was based on the Light Harp invented by Assaf Gurner. It was released as an optional accessory for the Mega Drive (Genesis) in 1993 and could read the player's physical movements using full-body motion tracking. It was a commercial failure due to its "unwieldiness and inaccuracy".

Motion controllers became more widely distributed with the seventh generation of video game consoles. The Nintendo Wii console's Wii Remote controller used an image sensor so it could be used as a pointing device along with an accelerometer to track straight-line motions and the direction of gravity. The Nunchuk accessory for use in a second hand also featured an accelerometer. A later line of accessories and refreshed controllers labeled with the Motion Plus feature added gyroscopic sensors to track all three axes of rotation independent of whether the controller had line of sight to the sensors bar.

The PlayStation 3 launched with the Sixaxis controller included, which featured three-axis accelerometer motion tracking and a one axis gyroscope while not including the haptic feedback (vibration) seen in other modern consoles citing interference concerns. Both features were included in the later DualShock 3 controller refresh.

Several wand-based devices with accelerometer and gyroscopic sensors followed, including the ASUS Eee Stick, Sony PlayStation Move (adding computer vision via the PlayStation Eye to aid in position tracking), and HP Swing. Other systems used different mechanisms for input, such as Microsoft's Kinect, which combined infrared structured light and computer vision, and the Razer Hydra, which used a magnetometer.

Nintendo and Sony would adopt motion tracking using gyroscopes and accelerometers as a standard hardware feature in successive generations starting with their handheld consoles the 3DS and the PS Vita, both of which had the required three-axis accelerometers and gyroscopes. In the eighth generation of video game consoles Nintendo and Sony included those sensors as a standard feature of their two handed game controllers, the Wii U GamePad and the DualShock 4. The consoles also had support for some devices in the previous generation of motion controllers depending on individual games.

Valve's Steam Controller was designed solely for use with PC's and required its Steam software. Its 6DOF sensors were made available for use by games published on Steam, and options available to users allowed the use of its gyroscope as a pointer control. Its motion tracking features would later be adapted for the Steam Deck.

A wave of virtual reality headsets released in the 2010s adopted forms of 6DOF motion controllers; the HTC Vive was bundled with wand-like controllers, while controllers known as Oculus Touch were released initially as an optional accessory for Oculus Rift in December 2016, and became part of its standard equipment in July 2017. Both controllers are tracked using infrared emitters placed in the play space. Oculus later switched to an "inside-out" tracking system for Oculus Quest and Rift S, where the controllers are tracked by cameras in the headset itself.

The Nintendo Switch hybrid home/portable console and its included Joy-Con controllers feature 6DOF sensors in each controller in the pair as well as in the main body of the console. The optional Nintendo Switch Pro Controller and Poké Ball Plus controllers also feature 6DOF sensors.

In the ninth generation the Sony PlayStation 5 continues to provide similar motion tracking for the included DualSense controllers, while supporting the use of older generations of motion controllers when playing backwards compatible games.

By the mid-2020s, computer-vision pose estimation toolkits such as Google's MediaPipe enabled full-body motion tracking through an ordinary webcam in a web browser, removing the need for dedicated sensors.

== Notable controllers ==
- Microsoft SideWinder Freestyle Pro (Windows)
- EyeToy (PlayStation 2)
- Xbox Live Vision (Xbox 360)
- Wii Remote (Wii and Wii U)
- Sixaxis (PlayStation 3)
- DualShock 3, 4 and DualSense (PlayStation 3, PlayStation 4 and PlayStation 5)
- PlayStation Move (PlayStation 3, PlayStation 4 and PlayStation 5)
- Wii U GamePad (Wii U)
- Kinect (Xbox 360, Xbox One, Windows)
- Razer Hydra
- Xavix
- Joy-Con and Nintendo Switch Pro Controller (Nintendo Switch)
- Steam Controller
- Steam Deck
- Nex Playground

== See also ==
- 3D motion controller
- Flick Stick
- Gesture recognition
- Motion capture
