= Slide Adventure MAGKID =

2007 video game

- Developers: Nintendo NSD; Agenda
- Publisher: Nintendo
- Platform: Nintendo DS
- Release: JP: August 2, 2007
- Genre: Action
- Modes: Single player, Multiplayer

Slide Adventure MAGKID (スライドアドベンチャー マグキッド) is a 2007 video game published by Nintendo for the Nintendo DS video game console and released exclusively in Japan. The title was developed by Nintendo NSD (Network Service Development, Nintendo Co.) with programming assistance by Agenda.

Nintendo developed the tilt sliding technology hardware accessory, with Agenda providing software programming and JOE DOWN STUDIO providing audio. Longtime Nintendo creator Kazunobu Shimizu created the MagKid character and the game's concept.

== Slide Controller ==
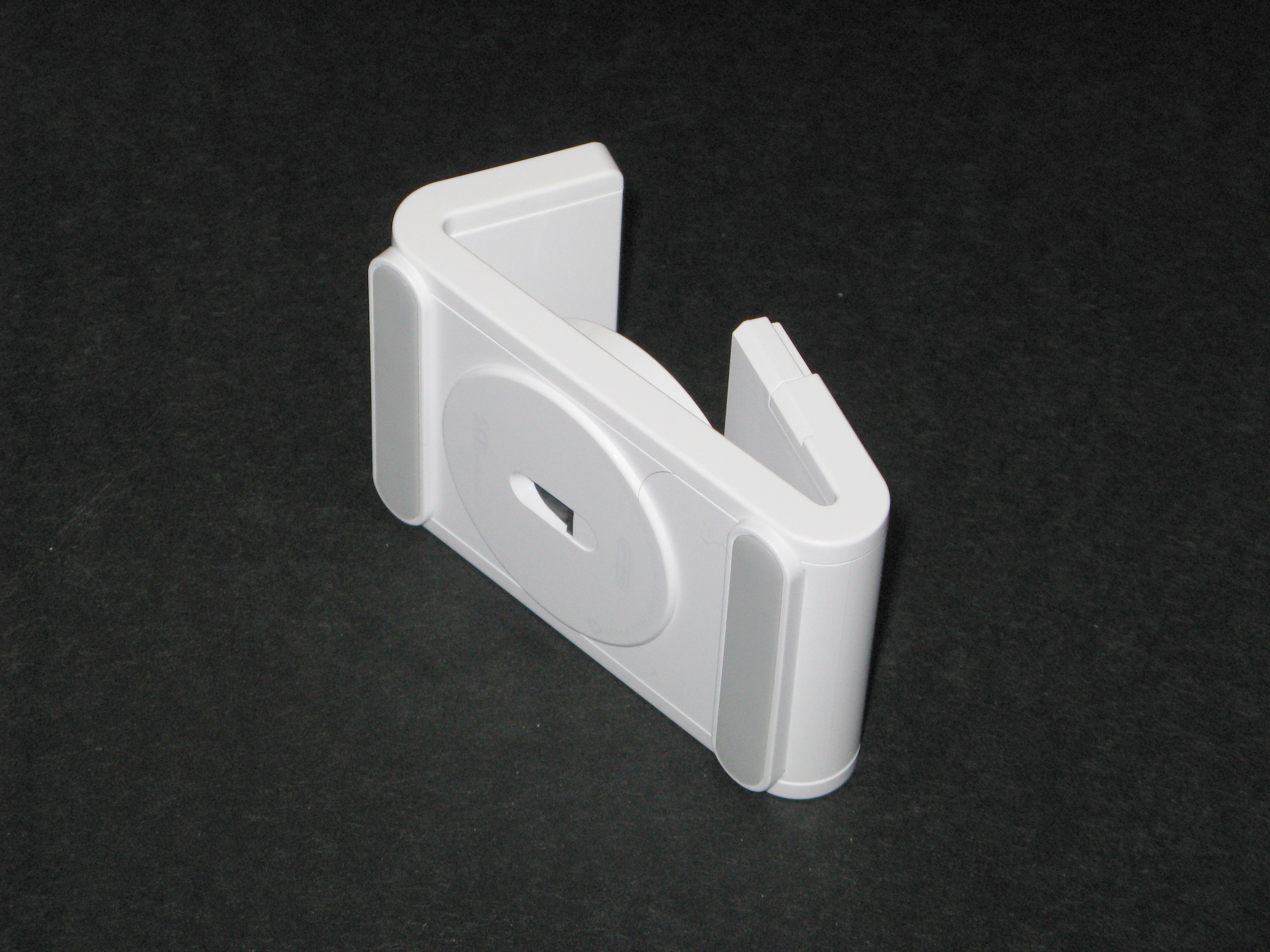
The "Slide Controller" connects to the underside of a Nintendo DS, making the entire device act as an optical mouse.

The Slide Controller bundled with the game is attached to Slot 2 of the DS, which makes use of the technology of a computer's optical mouse; the pak emits red light from a LED light located at the bottom of the controller. In gameplay, the player moves the Nintendo DS system and the Slide Controller to move MagKid across the screen.
