= Hatena (company) =

Japanese Internet services company

Hatena Co., Ltd.

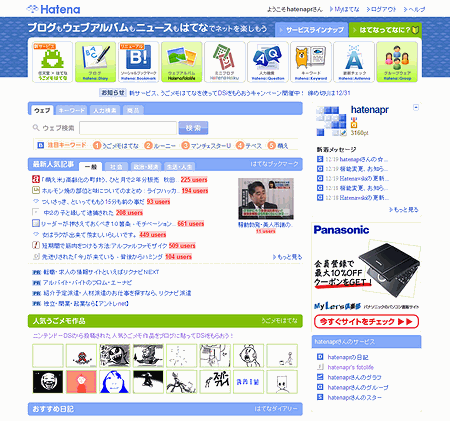
- Hatena top page Dec 2008
- Native name: 株式会社はてな
- Type: Kabushiki gaisha
- Industry: Web services
- Founded: Kyoto, Japan (July 19, 2001)
- Founder: Junya Kondo
- Headquarters: Kyoto, Japan
- Area served: Worldwide, mainly Japan
- Number of employees: 71
- Website: hatena.ne.jp

Hatena Co., Ltd. (株式会社はてな, Kabushiki-gaisha hatena) is an internet services company in Japan. It operates various services including the most popular social bookmarking service in Japan, Hatena Bookmark. Hatena is the collective name of the company's services. It was founded by Junya Kondo in Kyoto on July 19, 2001. The company moved its headquarters to Shibuya, Tokyo on April 10, 2004. The headquarters were moved back to Kyoto in April, 2008.

== Hatena Diary and Hatena Blog ==
Hatena Diary was Hatena's blog hosting service. On January 16, 2003, it was released as a beta version. On March 13, 2003, it was taken out of beta. Hatena Diary was a multi-lingual service which supported UTF-8 character encoding. Hatena Diary has a free version and a premium version. The chief characteristic of Hatena Diary was its keyword system. It was replaced on July 26, 2019 by Hatena Blog.

=== Hatena Notation ===
Hatena Notation, also known as Hatena Markup, is a markup language that can be used to produce content without the use of (X)HTML. There is also a Perl module available to parse Hatena markup.

=== ID Trackback ===
ID Trackback is a trackback not for a specific blog entry but for the specific user. If a user links to another Hatena Diary in their own Hatena Diary, a trackback is added automatically. ID Trackback is used to inform other users about what a user mentions on their Hatena Diary, and is designed to accelerate interaction between users of the service.

== Hatena Fotolife ==
Hatena Fotolife, started in 2004, is Hatena's in-house image hosting service. Typically, when an image is posted on one of Hatena's other services, it would also be uploaded to a fotolife gallery under the name of the user who posted it. The website could also be uploaded to directly. Hatena Fotolife is only available in Japanese.

== Hatena Keyword ==
Hatena Keywords is Hatena's dictionary service and automatically links to common Hatena services which mention the keyword. If a user meets the requirements and becomes a "Hatena Citizen", they may create and modify Hatena keywords.

== Hatena Bookmark ==
Hatena Bookmark is a social bookmarking service. It is often colloquially referred to as Hatebu (Japanese: はてブ). The user can save a specific URL as a bookmark and tag it. They are able to interact with the other users through the tags, and can leave comments of up to 100 double-byte characters in length.

Hatena Bookmark counts the number of users per specific URL, and so it is possible to see what bookmarks are popular among Hatena users. An "Add to Hatena Bookmark" button is integrated into a lot of famous news sites, such as asahi.com, CNET Japan, ZDNet Japan, Nikkei ITpro, and ITmedia.

== Hatena Imacoco ==
Hatena Imacoco was a tool for sharing one's location on Hatena's services, with it commonly being used on the Japanese version of Hatena Haiku. It took the form of a little button one could press with footprints on it, as well as being a website of its own. Once used, it would post a small embedded map with the user's current geographical location marked on it, as well as their local surroundings.

== Hatena in English ==
In mid-2007, Hatena was made available in the English language. The services available on the English hatena.com site are:

- Hatena Haiku (a micro-blog service similar to Twitter or Jaiku. English service ended in January 2015. Japanese service also ended in March 2019). There was also a site named "Hatena Haiku 2" with a layout likely designed for use with mobile devices. However, this site would never leave beta and was eventually discontinued at an unknown time.
- Hatena World (a 3D interactive world similar to Second Life. Ended on June 18, 2010).
- Hatena Star (a blog post rating service, as well as a service for seeing the stars you've received on other services).
- Hatena Message (a messaging service).
- Flipnote Hatena (a flipbook hosting service, similar to YouTube and DeviantArt, for Flipnote Studio users. Ended on May 31, 2013).
- Hatena Monolith (a service that lets users scan barcodes and post them to their collections or Twitter. Ended on July 1, 2014).
- Miiverse (with Nintendo Network Business & Development. Ended on November 7, 2017).
- SplatNet 2 (a Splatoon 2 companion service for the Nintendo Switch Online app).
- Functions for the Super Smash Bros. Ultimate videogame.
- SplatNet 3 (successor to SplatNet 2 for Splatoon 3).
