= Joy-Con =

Nintendo Switch game controller

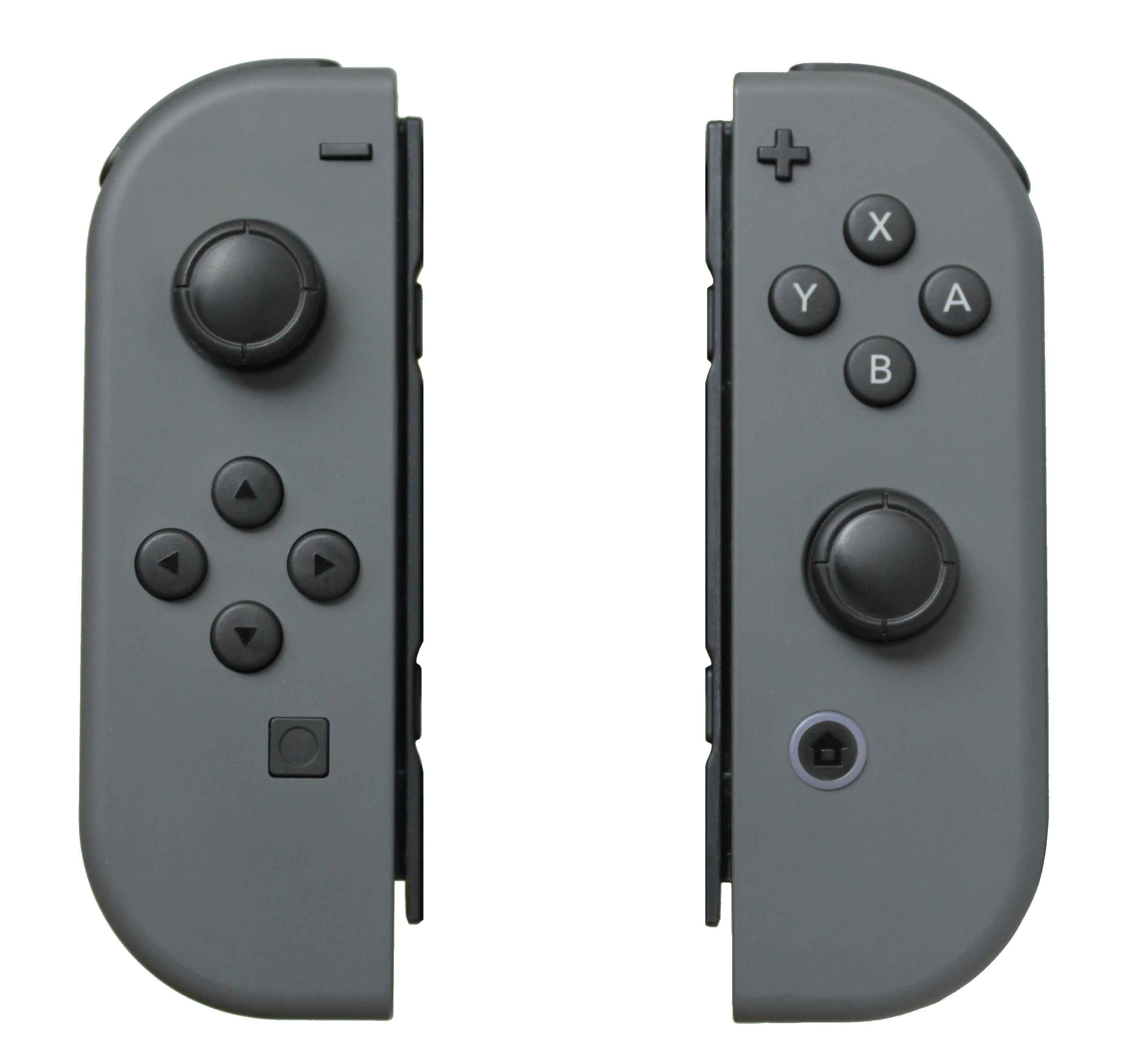
- A set of detached Grey Joy-Con used with the original Nintendo Switch
- Developer: Nintendo PTD
- Manufacturer: Nintendo
- Type: Motion controllers
- Generation: Eighth/Ninth
- Released: March 3, 2017
- Lifespan: 2017–present
- Input: Analog stick; Accelerometer; Gyroscope; Digital buttons: Joy-Con L: directional buttons, −, Capture, L, ZL, SL, SR, Left Stick (clickable); Joy-Con R: A, B, X, Y, +, HOME, R, ZR, SL, SR, Right Stick (clickable)
- Power: Internal 3.7 V, 525 mAh, 1.9 Wh lithium-ion polymer battery (non-removable)
- Weight: Joy-Con L: 48 g (1.7 oz); Joy-Con R: 51 g (1.8 oz)
- Predecessor: Wii Remote; Wii U GamePad
- Successor: Joy-Con 2
- Website: www.nintendo.com/switch

Joy-Con (Note: Japanese: ジョイコン, Hepburn: Joikon; Nintendo branded the controllers in Japan in its English name.) (Note: Officially, "Joy-Con" is both the singular and plural name.) are the primary game controllers for the Nintendo Switch, a hybrid video game console developed by Nintendo. A set of Joy-Con consists of two individual units, each containing an analog stick and an array of buttons. They can be used while attached to the main Nintendo Switch console unit, or detached and used wirelessly, by themselves or with a Joy-Con Grip. When detached, the pair can be used by a single player, or each Joy-Con can serve as an individual controller rotated on its side.

A successor, the Joy-Con 2, serve as the primary controllers for the Nintendo Switch 2. Being very similar, they have the addition of the GameChat button, and instead of sliding on as the originals do, they use magnets to snap into place. They are longer and have larger inside triggers than the original Joy-Cons.

== Design ==
Illustration of left and right Joy-Con controllers, in neon blue (L) and neon red (R)

Joy-Con are distributed in pairs, designated as "Joy-Con L" and "Joy-Con R" (Note: Officially stylized as Joy-Con (L) and Joy-Con (R) with parentheses) respectively. They each measure 35.9 by 102 by 13.9 millimetres (1.41 in × 4.02 in × 0.55 in), and the Joy-Con L and R weigh 49 grams (1.7 oz) and 52.1 grams (1.84 oz), respectively. When measured from the top of the analog stick to the tip of the ZL/ZR trigger it has an extreme depth of 28.4 millimetres (1.12 in).

Joy-Con can be attached to the sides of the Switch console via rails, detached and used wirelessly either as a pair divided between two different players. Alternatively, it can connect to a mobile device via Bluetooth. Up to 8 Joy-Cons can connect to a single Switch console at a time. The Joy-Con can be optionally attached to a "Joy-Con Grip" accessory, with or without charging capabilities, that convert the controllers to a more traditional gamepad-like form factor.

When detached from the console, both Joy-Con units operate autonomously of each other, and communicate with the console via Bluetooth. Wrist strap attachments are provided, which are similarly installed by sliding them onto the controllers' rails. The strap attachments have a rounded shape and raised shoulder buttons to improve the ergonomics of the Joy-Con when used individually.

Joy-Con contain non-removable 3.7 V, 525 mAh (1.9 Wh) lithium-ion polymer batteries; they are charged when attached to a Switch console that itself is charging. A separate "charging grip" accessory allows the controllers to be charged in a gamepad configuration via USB-C. Nintendo released a Joy-Con AA battery pack attachment on June 16, 2017, which slide onto the Joy-Con similarly to the wrist strap attachments.

=== Colors and variations ===
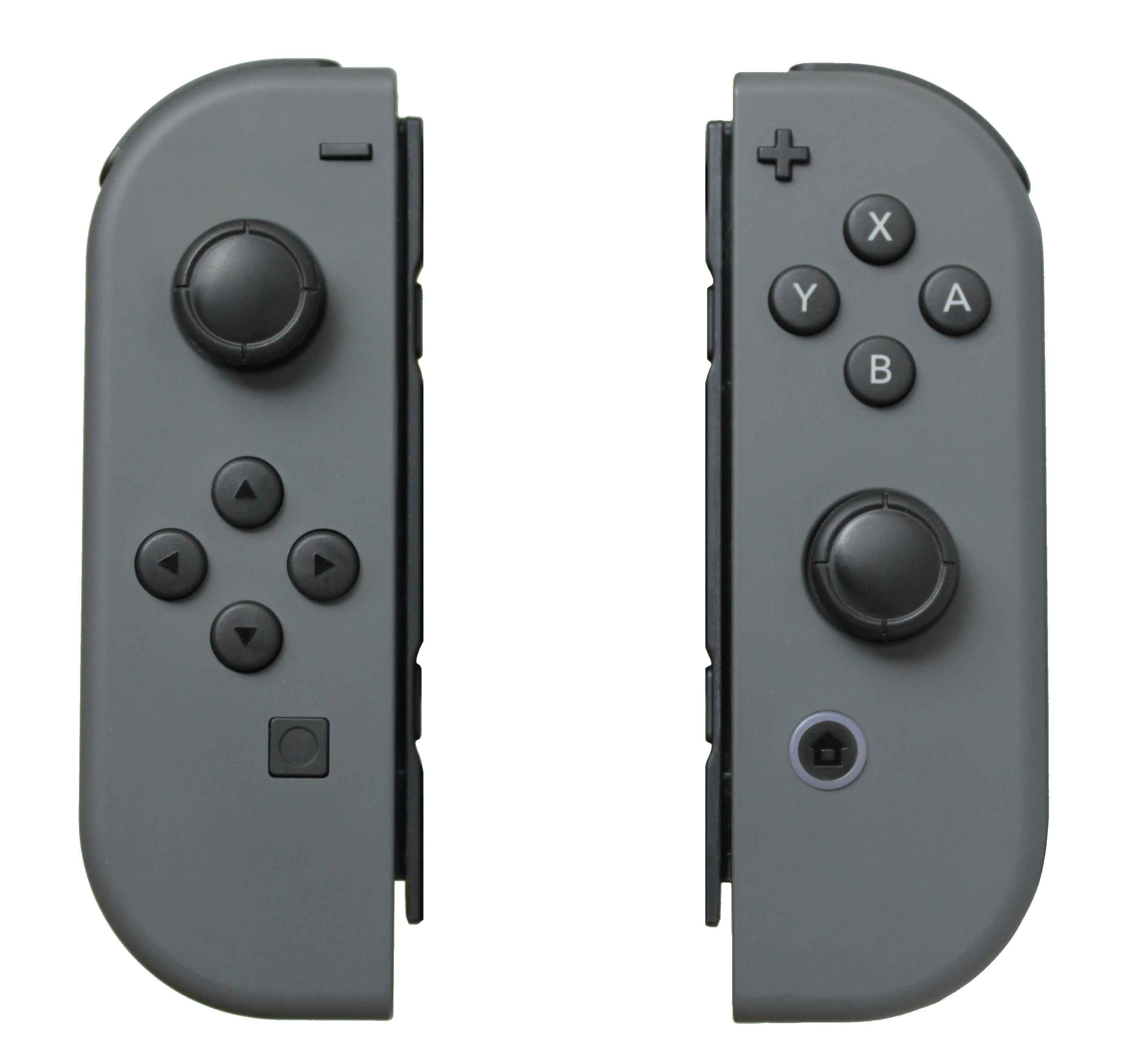
Gray

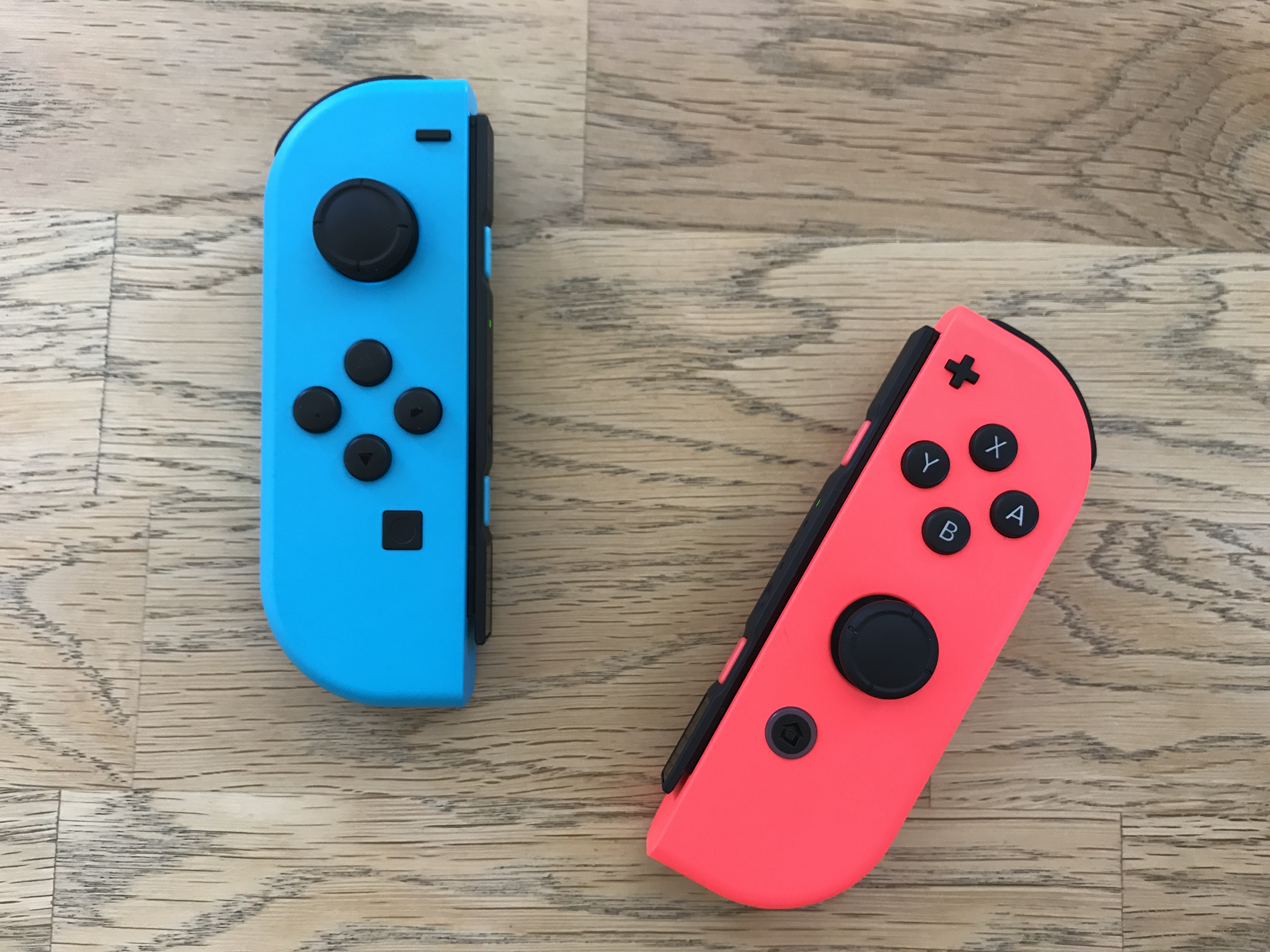
Neon Blue and Neon Red

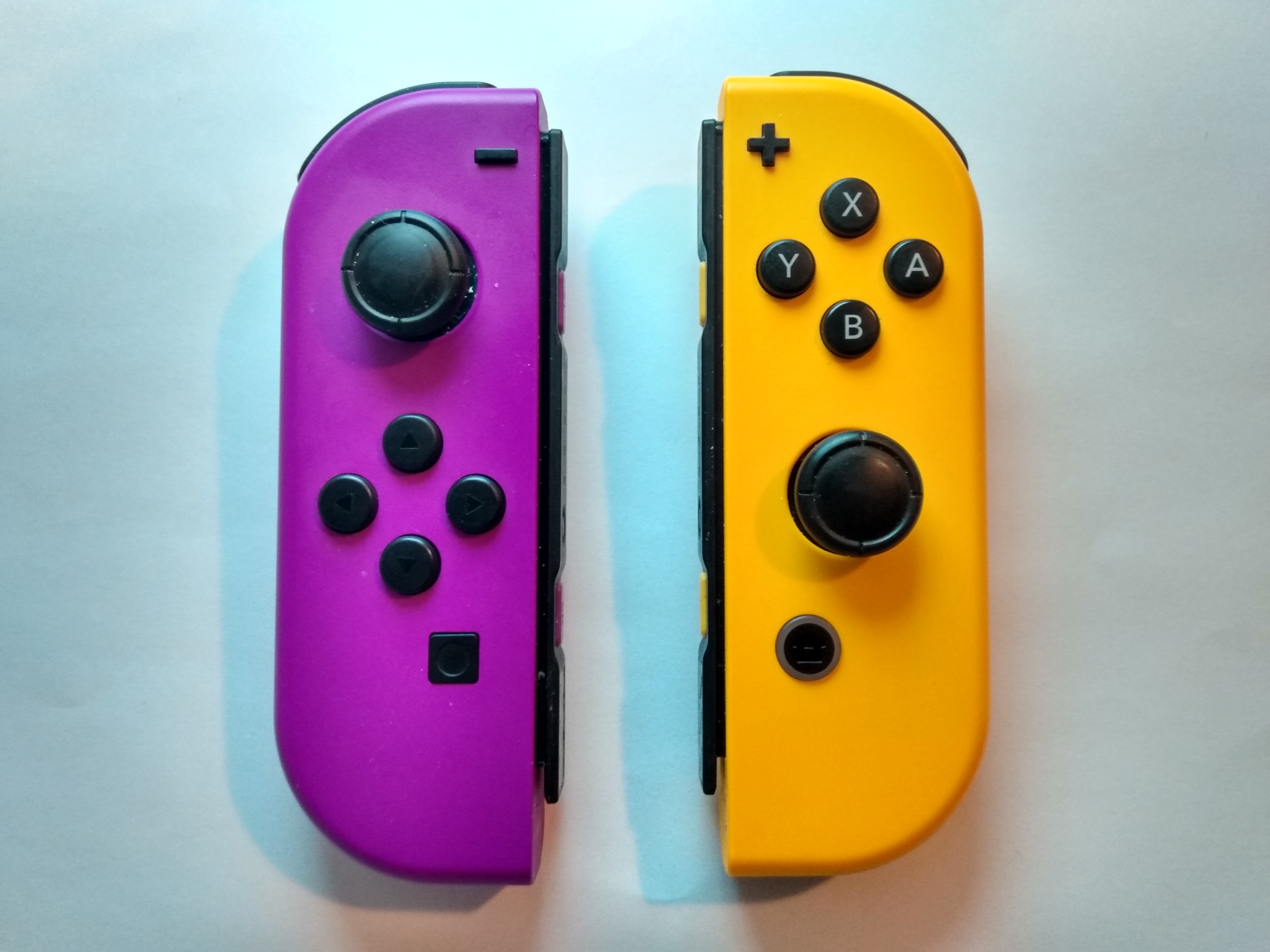
Neon Purple and Neon Orange

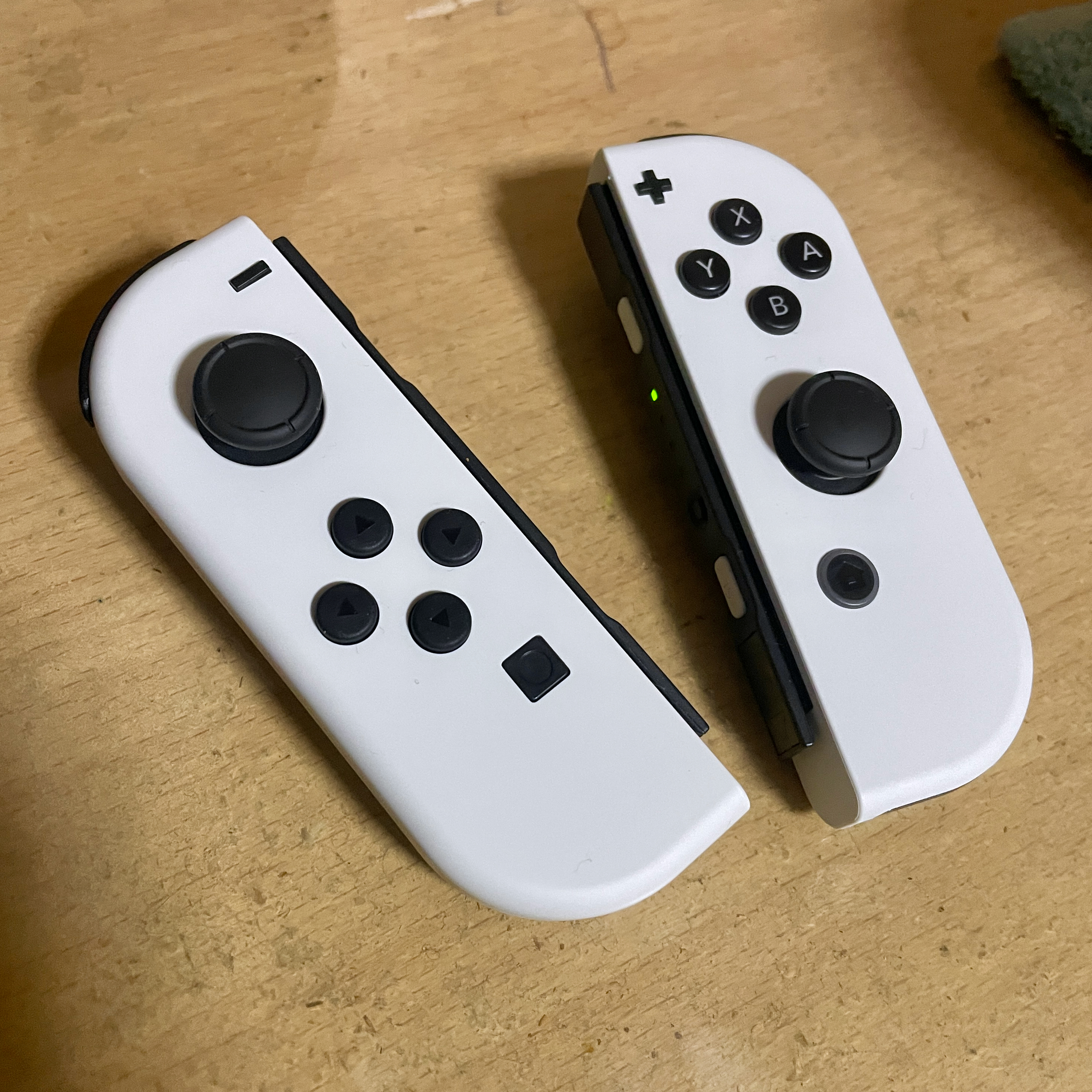
White

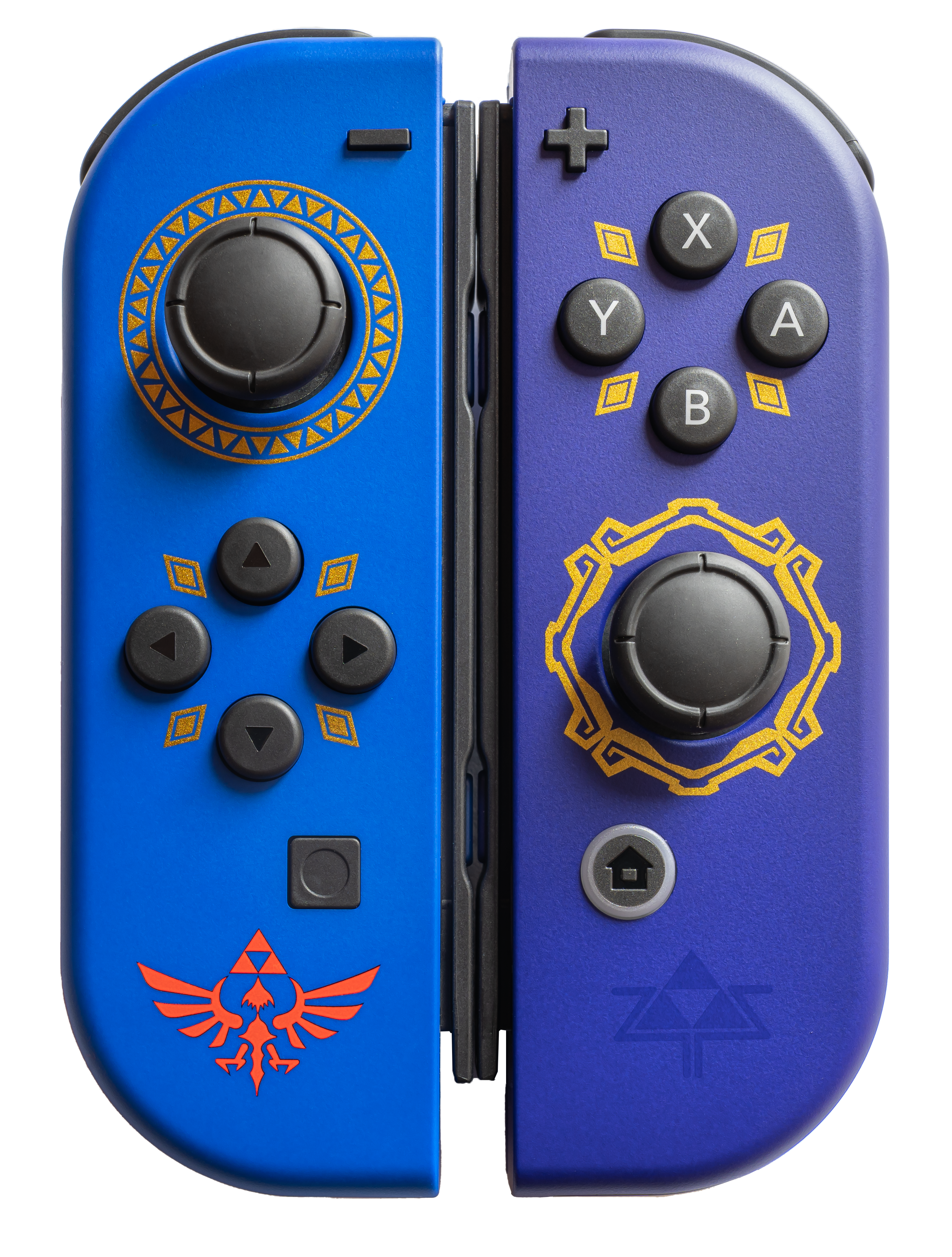
The Legend of Zelda: Skyward Sword HD–themed

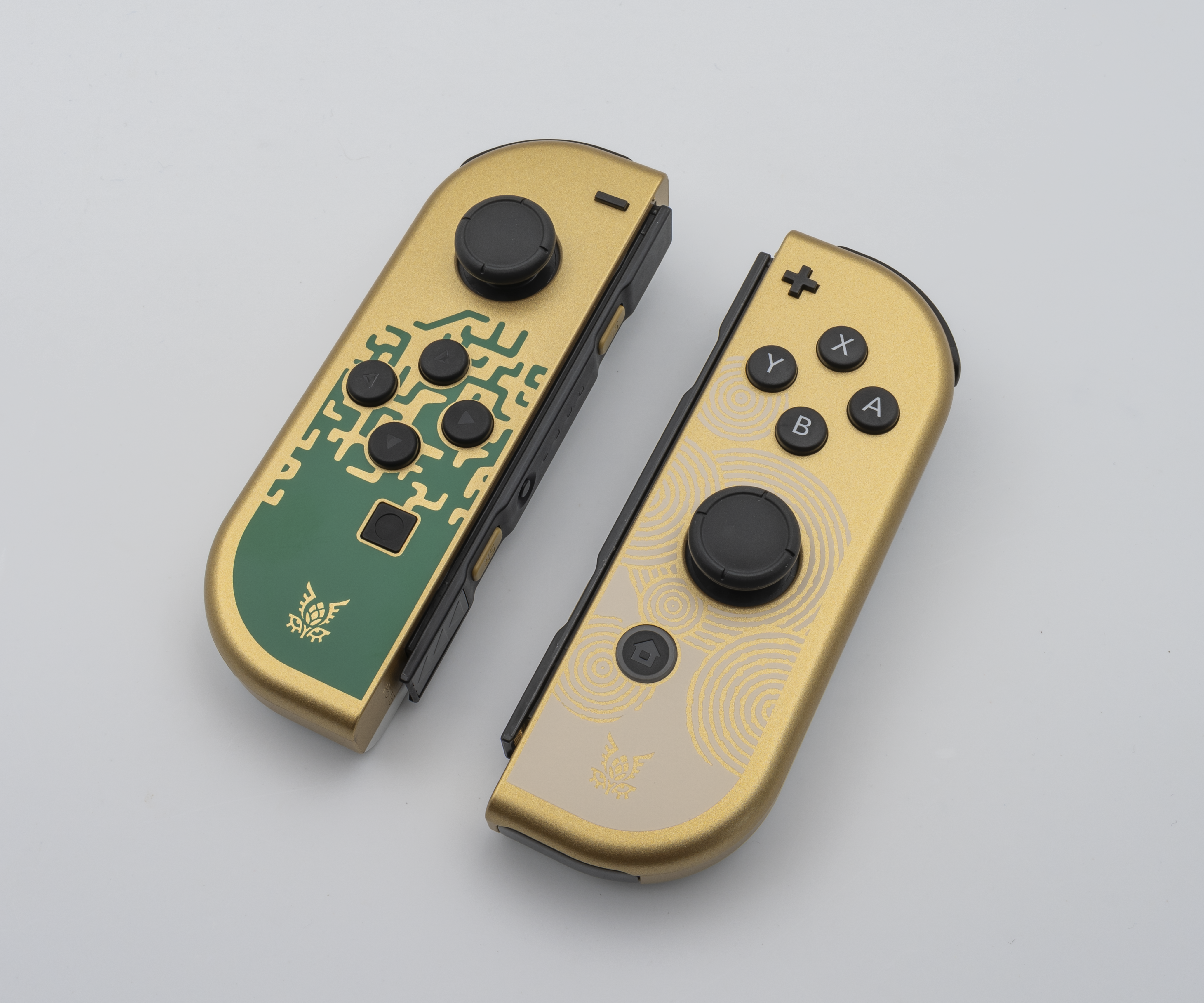
The Legend of Zelda: Tears of the Kingdom–themed

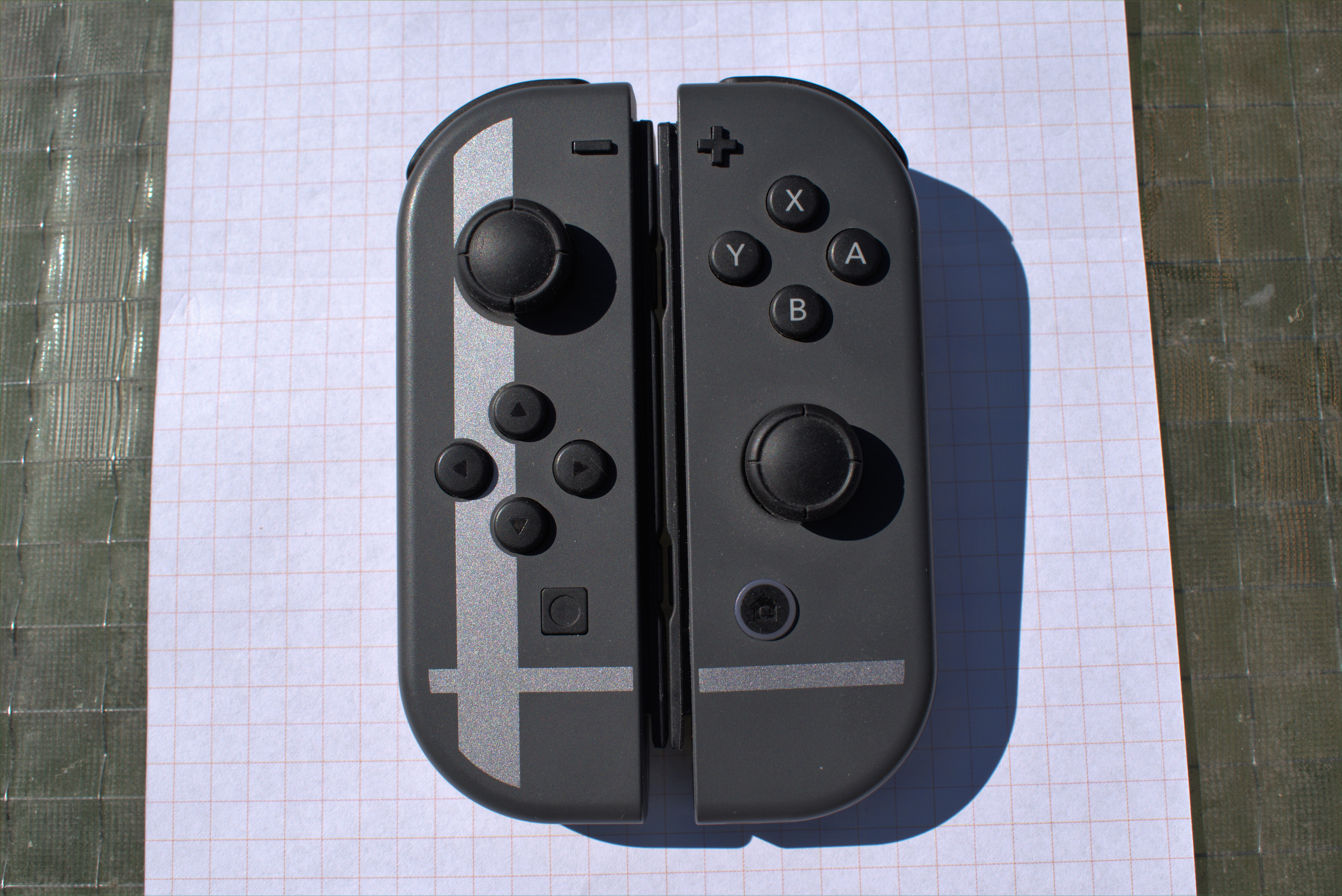
Super Smash Bros. Ultimate-themed

Joy-Con can be obtained in various colors, either with the purchase of the Switch console or individually, both separately or as a pair. At launch on March 3, 2017, Joy-Con were available in slate gray, neon red R and neon blue L colors. Black Joy-Con are also issued with Switch development kits. On April 12, 2017, Nintendo unveiled neon yellow Joy-Con, which released alongside Arms on June 16, 2017 as well as neon green and neon pink Joy-Con which launched alongside Splatoon 2 on July 21, 2017. A pair of red Joy-Con were released as part of the Super Mario Odyssey bundle, except in Japan and Europe (My Nintendo Store only) where they are available standalone, which was released on October 27, 2017. An exclusive Nintendo Labo Joy-Con design, light brown in color, was released in 2018. It was exclusively available to winners of the Nintendo Labo Creators Contest.

In July 2018, Hori, a video game peripheral company, released a dark blue left Joy-Con featuring a classic D-pad in lieu of directional buttons. The controller lacked features such as HD rumble, SL and SR buttons, gyroscope, and wireless connectivity standard to Nintendo-produced Joy-Con, forcing its users to be restricted to handheld mode. This was notably the first officially licensed Joy-Con to be released by a third-party company. Two more officially licensed D-pad variants featuring The Legend of Zelda: Breath of the Wild and Super Mario Odyssey themes were later released by Hori in September 2018. Joy-Con colors based on Eevee and Pikachu's color schemes were released alongside Pokémon: Let's Go, Pikachu! and Let's Go, Eevee! on November 16, 2018, as part of the Switch bundle for the games, and Hori released a fourth D-pad Joy-Con variant featuring a Pikachu theme on the same day. Gray Joy-Con variants featuring a silver Super Smash Bros. series cross logo became available for pre-order alongside Super Smash Bros. Ultimate on November 2, 2018, and were later released on December 7, 2018, as part of the Super Smash Bros. Ultimate Switch bundle.

On July 17, 2019, Nintendo announced that the neon purple and neon orange Joy-Con would be released on October 4, 2019, as well as the blue and neon yellow Joy-Con. Ultramarine blue Joy-Con launched alongside Dragon Quest XI S in Japan only on September 27, 2019, as part of the Dragon Quest XI S Loto Edition Switch bundle. Pink and mulberry Tsum Tsum Joy-Con launched alongside Disney Tsum Tsum Festival in Japan only on October 10, 2019, as part of the Disney Tsum Tsum Festival Switch bundle. Gray Joy-Con variants with a thunderbolt symbol on the left and a Pikachu silhouette on the right were released only in Japan on November 29, 2019, as part of the Thunderbolt Project Switch bundle.

Medium aquamarine and sky blue Joy-Con became available for pre-order alongside Animal Crossing: New Horizons on March 13, 2020, and were later released on March 20, 2020, as part of the Animal Crossing: New Horizons Switch bundle. Sunglow yellow and French blue Joy-Con were released as part of two Fortnite bundles; the sunglow yellow Joy-Con L and French blue Joy-Con R were released on October 6, 2020, in Europe and November 6, 2020, in Australia and New Zealand as part of the Fortnite special edition Switch bundle, and the French blue Joy-Con L and sunglow yellow Joy-Con R were released as part of the Fortnite – Fleet Force bundle on June 4, 2021.

Red Mario Joy-Con launched on January 12, 2021, as part of the Mario Red & Blue Edition-themed Switch bundle. Gray Joy-Con variants featuring silver and gold Monster Hunter Rise artwork were released on March 26, 2021, as part of the Monster Hunter Rise Switch bundle. A blue Joy-Con pair themed after the Master Sword and Hylian Shield from The Legend of Zelda: Skyward Sword HD was released alongside the game on July 16, 2021. White Joy-Con were released on October 8, 2021, as part of the white Nintendo Switch – OLED Model bundle. Blue and neon yellow Joy-Con variants with artwork themed after Splatoon 3 became available to pre-order alongside Splatoon 3 on August 26, 2022, and were later released on September 9, 2022, as part of the Splatoon 3 Switch – OLED Model bundle. Dark red and purple Joy-Con variants with artwork themed after Pokémon Scarlet and Violet were available to pre-order alongside Pokémon Scarlet and Violet on November 4, 2022, and were later released on November 18, 2022, as part of the Pokémon Scarlet and Violet Switch – OLED Model bundle.

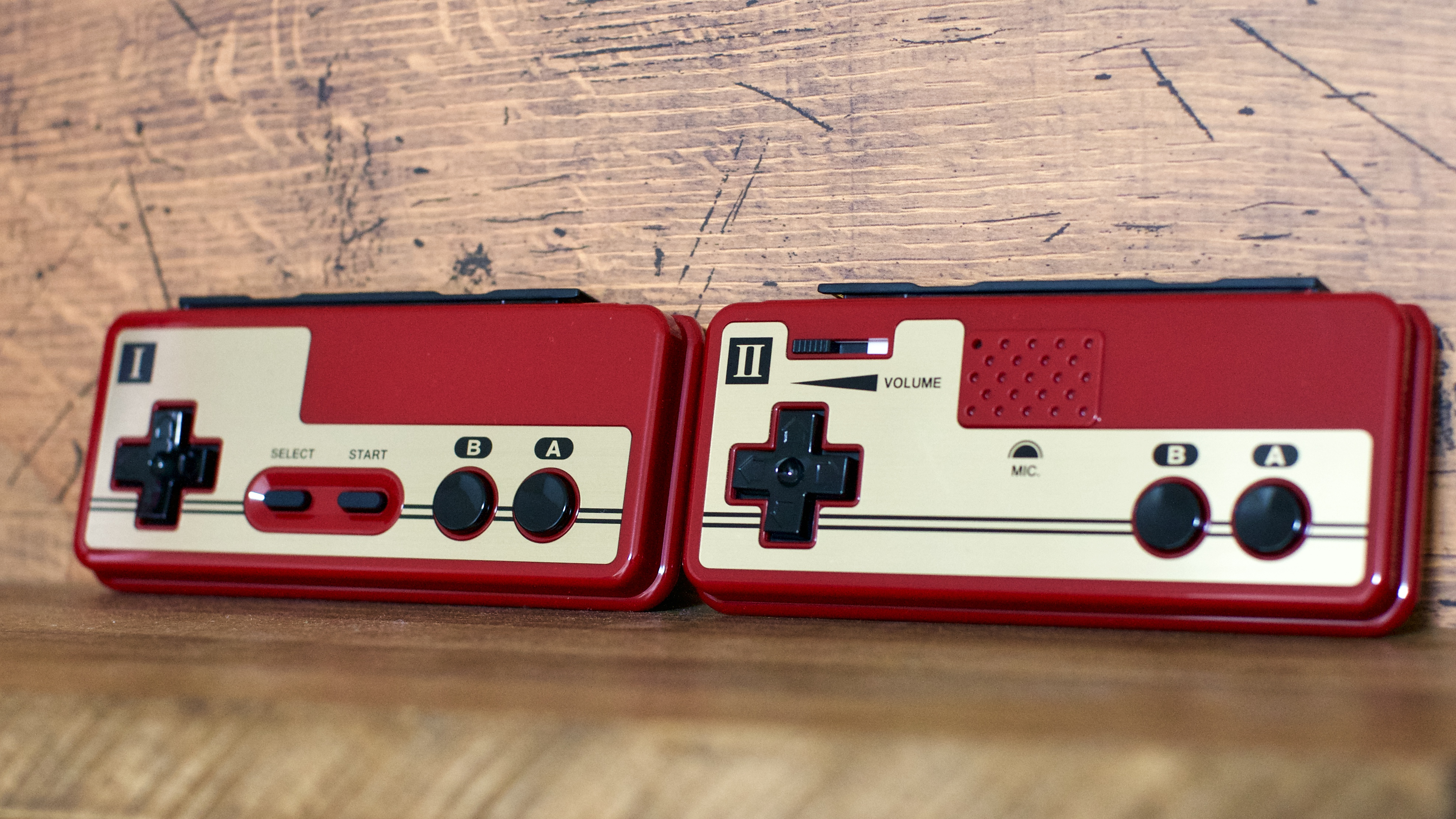
Joy-Con based on the Family Computer controllers, released in Japan for Nintendo Switch Online subscribers

In December 2018, Nintendo released two Joy-Con variants with designs resembling original Nintendo Entertainment System (NES) controllers, and Family Computer (Famicom) controllers in Japan, available exclusively to users with an active Nintendo Switch Online subscription. The Famicom variants are only available to Nintendo Switch Online members in Japan, Hong Kong, and Taiwan. These variants were specifically designed to be used with the Nintendo Classics library of NES titles available through the Nintendo Switch Online service, but can also be used with select Nintendo Switch titles. Both are notable for heavily deviating from the normal Joy-Con design, instead being taller and more rectangular in shape, having fewer buttons than standard Joy-Con, and, in the case of the Famicom variants, featuring a working microphone in the right controller.

List of official Standard Joy-Con colors
Name	Color	L	R
Gray		Yes	Yes
Neon Blue		Yes	Yes
Neon Red		Yes	Yes
Neon Yellow		Yes	Yes
Neon Green (Note: Initially released as a special edition color for Splatoon 2. Later released as standard color in all regions.)		Yes	Yes
Neon Pink		Yes	Yes
Red (Note: Initially released as a special edition color for Super Mario Odyssey. Later released as standard color in Japan and Europe via the My Nintendo Store only.)		Yes	Yes
Blue		Yes	Yes (Note: Only available in Japanese My Nintendo Store)
Neon Purple		Yes	Yes
Neon Orange		Yes	Yes
White (Note: Only available with the Nintendo Switch (OLED model))		Yes	Yes
Pastel Pink		Yes	Yes
Pastel Yellow		Yes	Yes
Pastel Purple		Yes	Yes
Pastel Green		Yes	Yes

List of official special edition Joy-Con colors
Name	Color	L	R
Labo Creators Contest	Fawn	Yes	Yes
Pokémon: Let's Go, Pikachu! Pokémon: Let's Go, Eevee!	Yellow	No	Yes
Pokémon: Let's Go, Pikachu! Pokémon: Let's Go, Eevee!	Bronze	Yes	No
Super Smash Bros. Ultimate	Silver	Yes	Yes
Monster Hunter Rise	Silver	Yes	Yes
Thunderbolt Project	Silver	Yes	Yes
Dragon Quest XI S	Ultramarine blue	Yes	Yes
Disney Tsum Tsum	Mulberry	Yes	No
Disney Tsum Tsum	Pink	No	Yes
Animal Crossing: New Horizons	Medium aquamarine	Yes	No
Animal Crossing: New Horizons	Sky blue	No	Yes
Super Mario	Red	Yes	Yes
Fortnite	Sunglow	Yes	No
Fortnite	French blue	No	Yes
Fortnite – Fleet Force Bundle	Sunglow	No	Yes
Fortnite – Fleet Force Bundle	French blue	Yes	No
The Legend of Zelda: Skyward Sword HD	Bright navy blue	Yes	No
The Legend of Zelda: Skyward Sword HD	Violet-blue	No	Yes
Splatoon 3	Bright Blue	Yes (Note: Only available with the Splatoon-themed Nintendo Switch (OLED model))	No
Splatoon 3	Bright Yellow	No	Yes
Pokémon Scarlet Pokémon Violet	Scarlet	Yes (Note: Only available with the Pokémon Scarlet and Violet themed Nintendo Switch (OLED model))	No
Pokémon Scarlet Pokémon Violet	Violet	No	Yes
The Legend of Zelda: Tears of the Kingdom	Gold	Yes (Note: Only available with the Tears of the Kingdom-themed Nintendo Switch (OLED model))	Yes

Notes

Not all colors or L/R variants are available in all regions.

== Features ==
The feature set of the Joy-Con was partially inspired by feedback from players using the Wii Remote, according to Nintendo's Shinya Takahashi. After releasing games that heavily used the Wii Remote with the Wii, such as Wii Sports (2006), Wii Play (2006), Wii Fit (2007), and Wii Party (2010), players had asked for different design features, such as having a smaller form factor, or being able to be strapped to a part of the body. Nintendo envisioned what benefits towards innovative design and gameplay could come from a smaller form factor, which led to the idea of a console that could be portable, controlled through these smaller controllers. This became the fundamental principle of the Switch, and directly into the Joy-Con design.

Each controller contains a clickable analog stick, four face buttons, two top buttons, two side buttons accessible when detached (which become shoulder buttons when held horizontally) and designated as SL and SR, a + or - button, a SYNC button, and player indicator LEDs. Joy-Con L contains directional buttons, a - button, top buttons designated as L and ZL, and a capture button, which enables the player to upload screenshots to social media. In an update released on October 18, 2017, the capture button is also able to record up to 30 seconds of gameplay when held down for a second. Joy-Con R contains A, B, X, and Y buttons, a + button, top buttons designated as R and ZR, and a HOME button.

Each Joy-Con contains an accelerometer and gyroscope, which can be used for motion tracking. Games can support using the Joy-Con for pointing controls similar to the Wii Remote while detached without the need of a sensor bar. Joy-Con R contains an infrared depth tracking sensor, which can read objects and motions held in front of it; as an example of its functionality, Nintendo stated that the sensor could distinguish between the hand shapes of rock paper scissors. Joy-Con R also contains a near-field communication reader for use with Amiibo.

The Joy-Con contains a haptic feedback engine known as "HD Rumble", which was developed in partnership with Immersion Corporation. Nintendo stated that the system could generate fine tactile feedback, such as the sensation of individual ice cubes and water in a glass.

It was discovered shortly after public release that Joy-Con can connect to and be used with other Bluetooth-enabled personal computers and mobile devices. Official Joy-Con support was also added to iPhones and iPads as part of the iOS 16 and iPadOS 16 updates on September 12 and October 24, 2022, respectively.

In July of 2026, Nintendo would receive new versions of the Joy-Cons, with replaceable batteries. This change was made because of both the EU Right to Repair Directive and the EU Batteries Regulation. It is not a easily swappable battery, requiring the device to be taken apart.

== Joy-Con 2 ==
Joy-Con 2
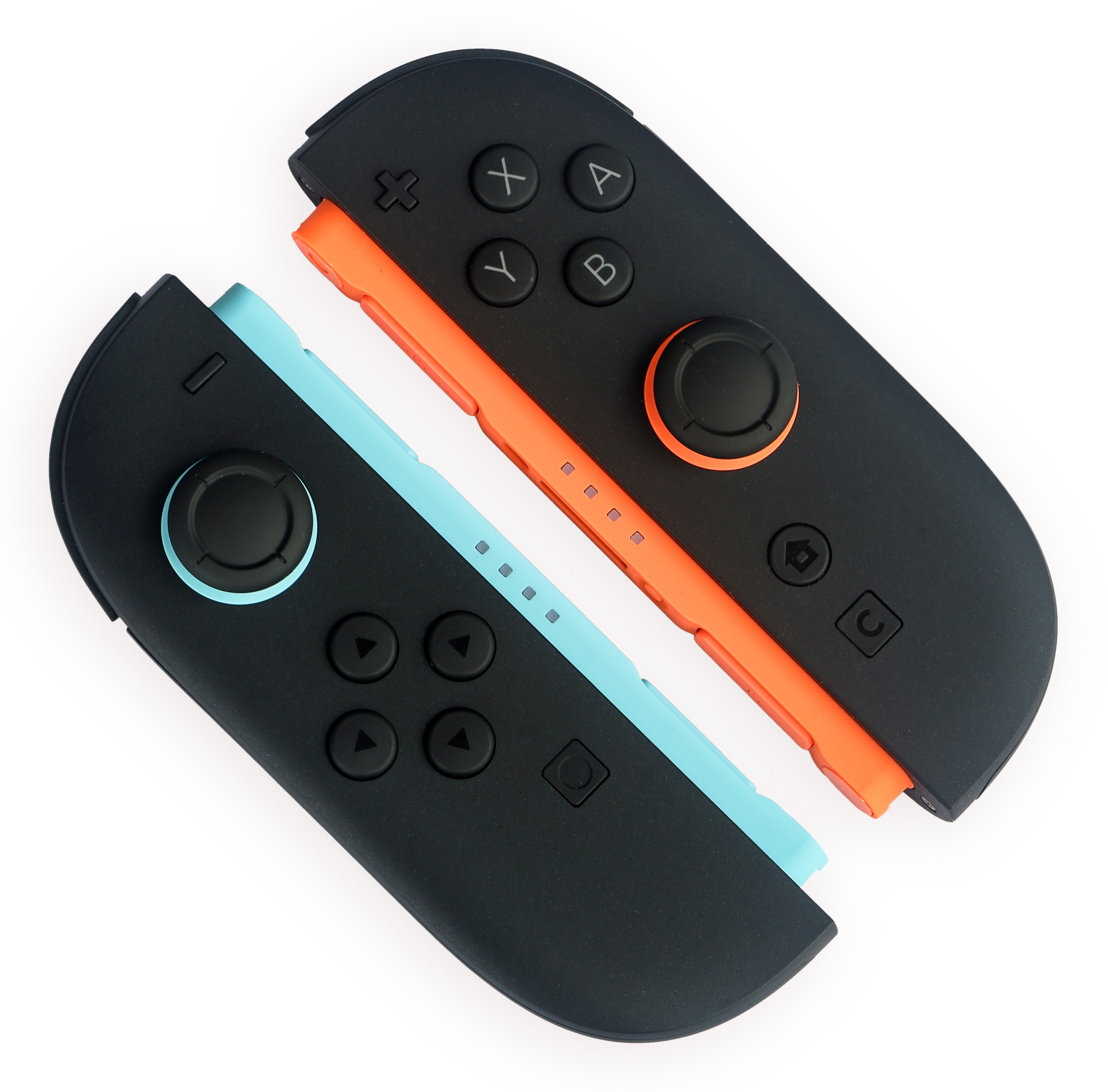
- A set of detached Light Blue and Light Red Joy-Con 2
- Developer: Nintendo TDD
- Manufacturer: Nintendo
- Type: Motion controllers
- Released: June 5, 2025
- Input: Analog stick; Accelerometer; Gyroscope; Optical mouse; Digital buttons: Joy-Con L: directional buttons, −, Capture, L, ZL, SL, SR, Left Stick (clickable); Joy-Con R: A, B, X, Y, +, HOME, C, R, ZR, SL, SR, Right Stick (clickable)
- Weight: Joy-Con L: 65 g (2.3 oz); Joy-Con R: 68 g (2.4 oz)
- Predecessor: Joy-Con

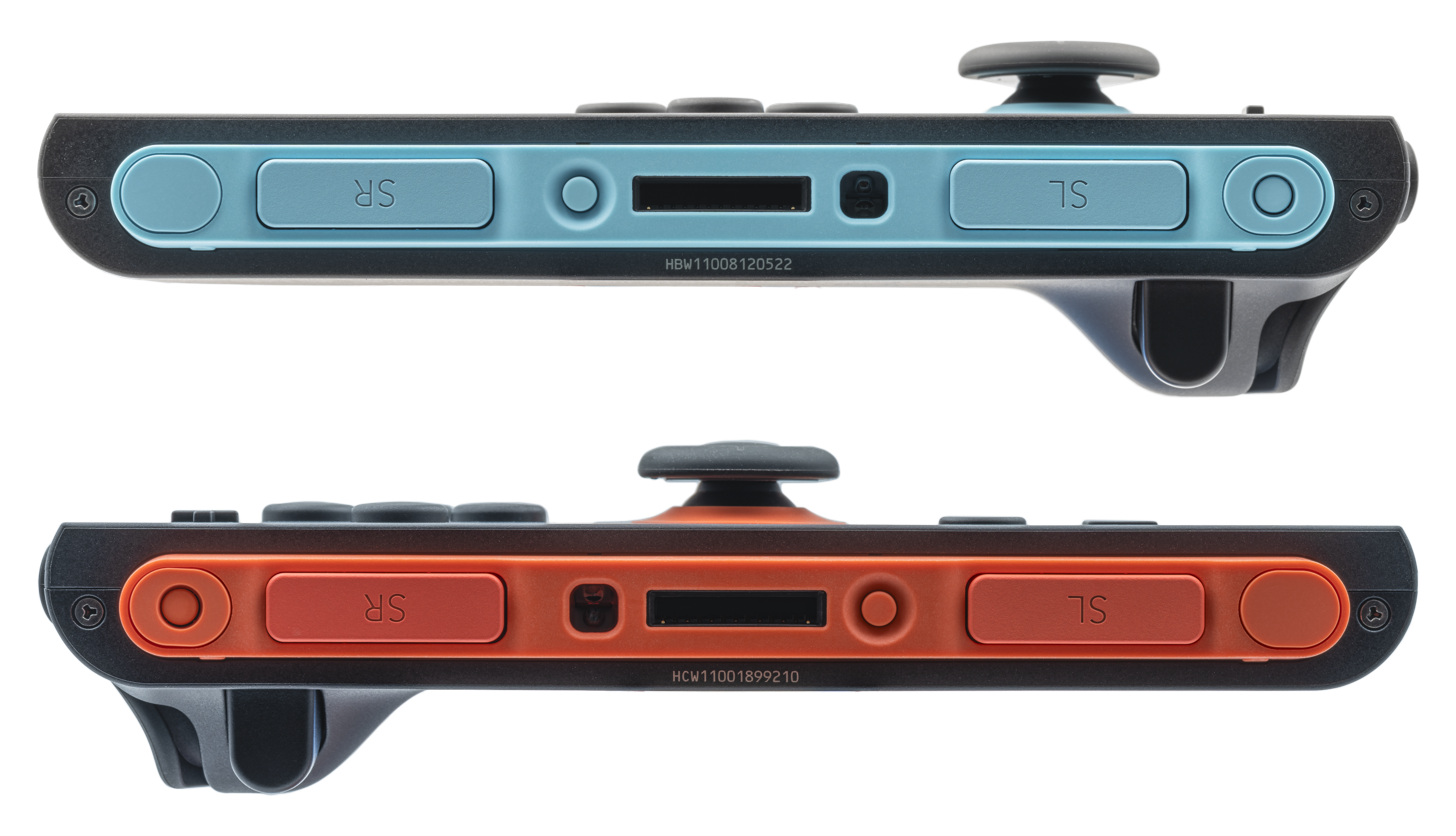
Side view of the Joy-Con 2 controllers

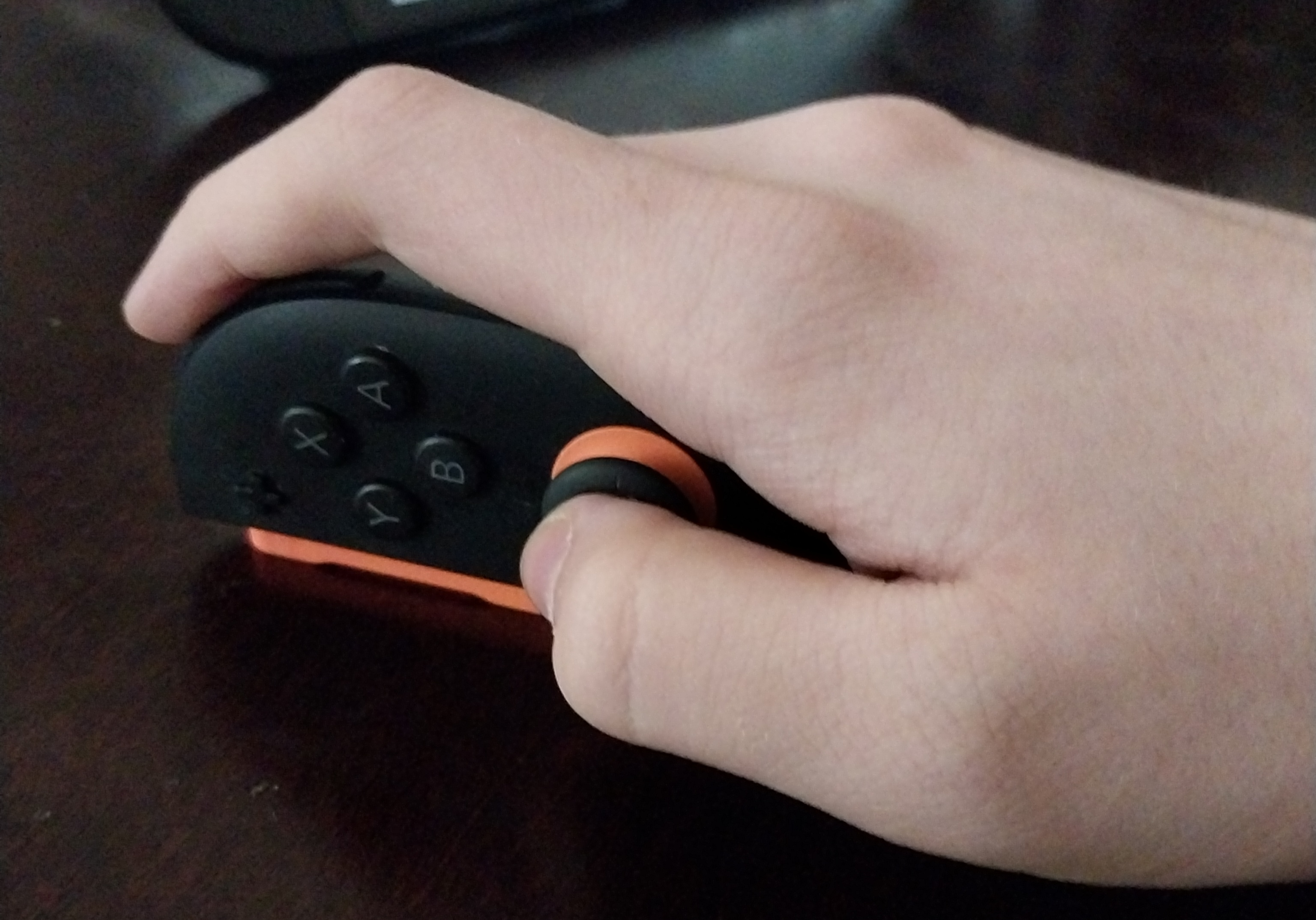
The right Joy-Con 2 being used as a mouse

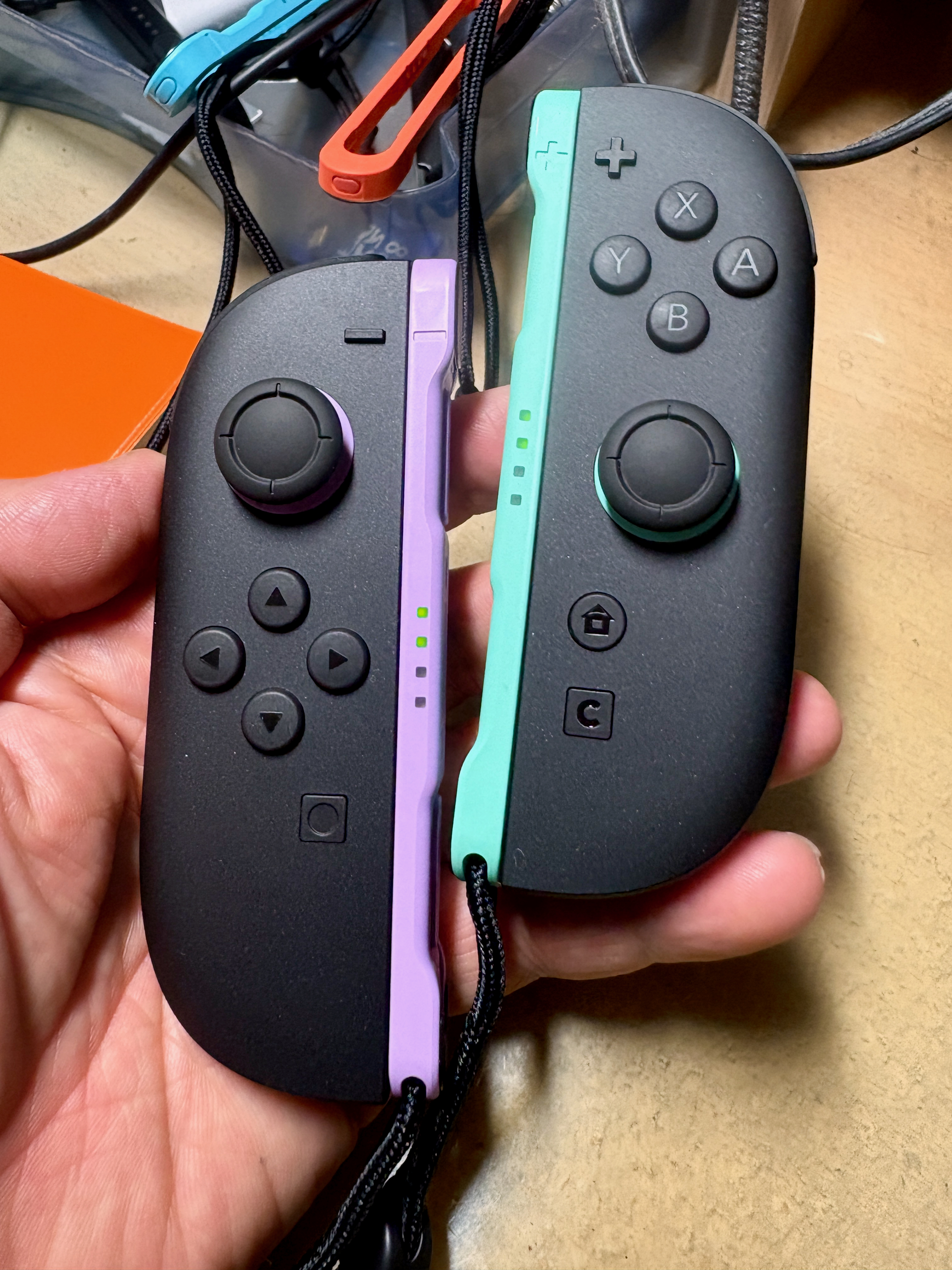
Light Purple and Light Green Joy-Con 2

Joy-Con 2, (Note: Japanese: ジョイコン2, Hepburn: Joikon Tsū; Nintendo branded the controllers in Japan in its English name.) the second iteration of the Joy-Con, was unveiled on January 16, 2025, alongside the announcement of the Nintendo Switch 2.

=== Design ===
The Joy-Con 2 controllers feature a larger size to match the larger console body, buttons that are easier to push, and a new color palette. Notably, the Joy-Con 2 now snap onto a console or grip using magnets, rather than sliding into rails. To detach from the main unit, a small button on the back of the controller extends a cylinder to push the controller away from the magnetic field.

Nintendo stated that their analog sticks would be larger, smoother, and more durable. Early reports indicated that the sticks would use Hall-effect sensors, which would address the drift issues that the original models had due to dust collecting within the analog system; however, on April 7, 2025, Nintendo confirmed that the Joy-Con 2 analog sticks would not use Hall-effect sensors.

The SL and SR buttons have been enlarged, and a "C" button is present on the right-side Joy-Con 2 R controller to activate the GameChat feature. Each Joy-Con 2 controller functions as an optical mouse when slid along any surface on its connector side, and can be treated as such in supported games. Both Joy-Con 2 controllers have a 500 mAh battery that is estimated to last 20 hours. The controllers are recharged when connected to the console or by using a third-party charging dock or grip. The infrared sensor from the original Joy-Con R controller was not included in the Joy-Con 2 R controller.

The original Joy-Con controllers are largely compatible with the Nintendo Switch 2. For various reasons, some features of original Nintendo Switch titles are supported only with original Joy-Con controllers, even on the Nintendo Switch 2. For example, WarioWare: Move It! uses the infrared sensor on the original Joy-Con R, and the Ring-Con accessory required for Ring Fit Adventure accommodates only the original Joy-Con.

=== Colors and variations ===
The Switch 2 console ships with light blue L and light red R Joy-Con 2, and at launch these were the only colors available. On January 8, 2026, Nintendo unveiled light purple L and light green R controllers, which released on February 12, alongside Mario Tennis Fever. On June 9, Nintendo unveiled blue L and light yellow R controllers, which released on July 23, alongside Splatoon Raiders.

On September 8, Nintendo revealed their first special edition Joy-Con 2 controllers based on The Legend of Zelda. It was released on October 29, a week ahead of the release of the Ocarina of Time remake.

=== Colors ===
List of official Joy-Con 2 colors
Name	Color	L	R
Light Blue		Yes	No
Light Red		No	Yes
Light Purple		Yes	No
Light Green		No	Yes
Blue		Yes	No
Light Yellow		No	Yes

List of official special edition Joy-Con 2 colors
Name	Color	L	R
The Legend of Zelda 40th Anniversary Edition	Green and gold	Yes	Yes

== Reception ==
=== Technical problems ===
Prior to the public release of Nintendo Switch, various video gaming websites reported that the controllers—most commonly the Joy-Con L—were susceptible to connection losses when used wirelessly. It was initially unknown whether these problems were the result of an interference issue, or caused by the pre-launch software on review units. A Nintendo spokesperson stated to Polygon that the company would "continue to monitor the performance of Nintendo Switch hardware and software, and make improvements when necessary". The company posted guidance on its support website for minimizing Bluetooth signal interference, including recommendations that the Switch console be placed away from other wireless-enabled devices. On March 22, 2017, Nintendo confirmed that the interference issues were caused by a "manufacturing variant" in a small number of Joy-Con from early production runs, and that the company would allow owners to send in their affected Joy-Con for repairs free-of-charge.

On launch, it was reported that the wrist strap attachments for the Joy-Con were hard to detach from the controllers. It was also reported that a wrist strap could easily be attached to the Joy-Con incorrectly and become difficult to remove.

==== Joy-Con drift ====
One of the more common issues to be found with the Joy-Con is joystick drift. This issue occurs when dust or other small particles come in contact with the internal sensors of the analog stick. A common remedy for this issue is to apply compressed air or contact cleaner under the rubber skirt of the joystick. Nintendo will repair this issue for free if under warranty, but the cost of repair for an out of warranty Joy-Con could be over US$40, according to many reports on the topic. The high price of repair leads many to buy an entirely new pair of Joy-Cons, as it costs only slightly more than a repair, with a single unit priced at $49.99 and a set of two at $79.99. In response to increased complaints and potential legal action for the drift issue, Nintendo stated that they were aware of the frequent reports, but did not offer immediate advice outside of contacting their technical support lines. On July 23, 2019, three days after the filing of a class action lawsuit, an internal Nintendo memo was leaked; the memo instructed the firm's customer service employees in North America to start offering repairs for drifting Joy-Con controllers for free, regardless of warranty status.

Nintendo president Shuntaro Furukawa issued a public apology from the company for the drift problem as part of an investors' meeting in June 2020, stating "We apologize for any inconvenience caused to our customers regarding Joy-Con controllers. We are continuing to improve our products", but could not comment further due to ongoing legal cases related to the controllers.

With the release of the OLED revision of the Switch in October 2021, Nintendo said that the new Joy-Con design should reduce the drift problem, but they did not expect that they could ever eliminate the drift, as it was an issue related to wear from long-term usage. The new design of the joysticks in the OLED Joy-Con was made to reduce the effects of wear, but the company still anticipated drifting being a problem.

== Legal issues ==
=== Patent challenge ===
In August 2017, Los Angeles-based tablet peripheral manufacturer Gamevice filed a lawsuit against Nintendo in the United States District Court for the Central District of California, alleging that the design of the Joy-Con controllers conflicts with its patent on the design for the Wikipad, an Android-based gaming device that also features a tablet with a detachable controller. The lawsuit sought damages on existing Switch sales and banning further sales of the console. The lawsuit was voluntarily dismissed by Gamevice on October 23, 2017.

However, in March 2018, Gamevice initiated a second patent infringement lawsuit on Nintendo related to a different set of patents. Gamevice also sought action through the United States International Trade Commission related to patent infringement under Section 337 of the Tariff Act of 1930, and was seeking to block imports of the Switch into the United States.

=== Joy-Con drift lawsuits ===
Two class action lawsuits were filed in the United States District Court for the Western District of Washington in July 2019 and September 2019 over the Joy-Con drift issue. The first suit alleges that Nintendo is well aware of the defect but does not "disclose the defect and routinely refuses to repair the joysticks without charge"; the second suit alleges that the Joy-Con controllers are defective. It asserts claims for breach of warranty, fraud, and violations of numerous state consumer protection statutes. The court refused to dismiss the suits, and as of October 2020, are currently under arbitration hearings.

Two additional class action lawsuits were filed in October and November 2020 in the United States, respectively in the Northern California District Court and in the Western Washington District Court. Both suits allege Nintendo of having defective manufacturing processes for the Joy-Con, even after the company apologized for the problem, as the primary clients in both cases has purchased multiple Joy-Con but found the drift occurred over time in each set purchased. At least one of the lawsuits was dismissed in February 2023, as the judge ruled that the EULA for the Nintendo Switch required users to go through arbitration instead of lawsuits to resolve matters.

The French consumer group UFC-Que Choisir filed a lawsuit against Nintendo in September 2020 alleging that the Joy-Con were designed with planned obsolescence intended to fail or break due to the drift issue and other factors. The suit seeks to compel Nintendo to change its manufacturing process to improve the durability of the Joy-Con.

A consortium of nine European consumer organizations requested consumers inform them on Joy-Con drift issues in December 2020 as they negotiated with Nintendo on how to resolve the matters in that region. The organizations stated that they would plan legal action if they could not come to an agreement with Nintendo. The European Consumer Organisation (BEUC), which represents 40 consumers groups in the region, also urged the European Commission to investigate the Joy-Con drift issue in January 2021 after the body received 25,000 complaints.
