= Ring Fit Adventure =

- Ring Fit Adventure icon, depicting the female playable character, enemies and the Ring-Con accessory
- Developer: Nintendo EPD (Note: Additional work by 1-Up Studio, Mario Club and SRD)
- Publisher: Nintendo
- Director: Hiroshi Matsunaga
- Producer: Kouichi Kawamoto
- Designers: Naoya Yamamoto; Ryosuke Suzuki
- Programmer: Shinji Okane
- Artist: Takafumi Kiuchi
- Writers: Mari Shirakawa; Yuichiro Ito
- Composers: Shinji Ushiroda; Maasa Miyoshi; Shiho Fujii; Asuka Hayazaki
- Platform: Nintendo Switch
- Release: October 18, 2019
- Genres: Exergame, role-playing
- Mode: Single-player

Ring Fit Adventure (Note: Japanese: リングフィット アドベンチャー, Hepburn: Ringu Fitto Adobenchā) is an exercising role-playing video game developed and published by Nintendo for the Nintendo Switch. The game comes with two physical components: the Ring-Con, a Pilates ring that the user holds and which one Joy-Con slots into, and a Leg Strap, a piece of fabric affixed to the user's leg that holds the other Joy-Con.

The game's main mode is a turn-based role-playing game in which movements and battle actions are based on performing physical activities using the Ring-Con and Leg Strap, with the Joy-Con's motion controls detecting the player's movement and a strain sensor in the Ring-Con detecting bending of that accessory. Other modes include guided fitness routines and party-style games. These activities are centered around common fitness exercises, making the game part of Nintendo's "quality of life" goals in line with the game's spiritual successor, Wii Fit. The game was released worldwide on October 18, 2019, and received generally positive reviews from critics. As of March 31, 2023, the game has sold over 15.38 million copies worldwide, making it one of the best-selling games on the system.

Demand for the game exceeded Nintendo's expectations, causing shortages in many countries. This led to resellers in America selling the game for over $300, up from its retail price of $80.

== Gameplay ==
Combat in Ring Fit Adventure has the player complete an exercise move (shown on left) to defeat enemies in game.

Ring Fit Adventure ships with the Ring-Con and Leg Strap, which have docks to hold the Switch's Joy-Con. These accessories are required to play the game, as the player's interactions with them are tracked by the motion controls built into the Joy-Con.

The game's main mode is a role-playing game in which the player takes the role of a young athlete who meets the sentient Ring and teams up with them to take down the evil, bodybuilding dragon Dragaux. The player moves their character across the game's overworld and into various dungeons, where they encounter monsters to fight. Moving across the game world is similar to a rail shooter; the player moves along a fixed path by running in place, jumps over obstacles by squeezing and releasing the Ring-Con, and can fire projectiles at items by squeezing the Ring-Con in the target direction. When the player encounters monsters, the game uses turn-based combat, in which the player attacks enemies by performing exercises, with the amount of damage they deal based on how effectively they completed the exercise. When monsters attack, the player can defend by pressing and holding the Ring-Con into their abdomen for as long as possible during the attack. Defeating monsters earn the player-character experience points, and as they level up, they can unlock additional exercises that deal more damage. Exercises are classified by color, with each color corresponding to a general part of the body the exercise is geared towards: red for arms, blue for legs, yellow for core muscles, and green for yoga positions. Monsters are also marked by colors, and exercises of the same color are more effective against them, but only after that ability is unlocked early in the game.

In addition to the adventure mode, the game includes a general fitness routine mode that allows the player to perform exercises separate from the game. The game also has mini-games based on certain exercises, which is either single-player or multiplayer. An update in late March 2020 added a "Rhythm Mode", which allows the player to exercise to music from the game as well as music from other Nintendo games, such as Super Mario Odyssey, The Legend of Zelda: Breath of the Wild, Splatoon 2, and Wii Fit.

The game includes the option to enable only quiet exercises to avoid disturbing others nearby. For example, in quiet mode, the running-in-place in the adventure mode is replaced by performing squats.

== Development ==
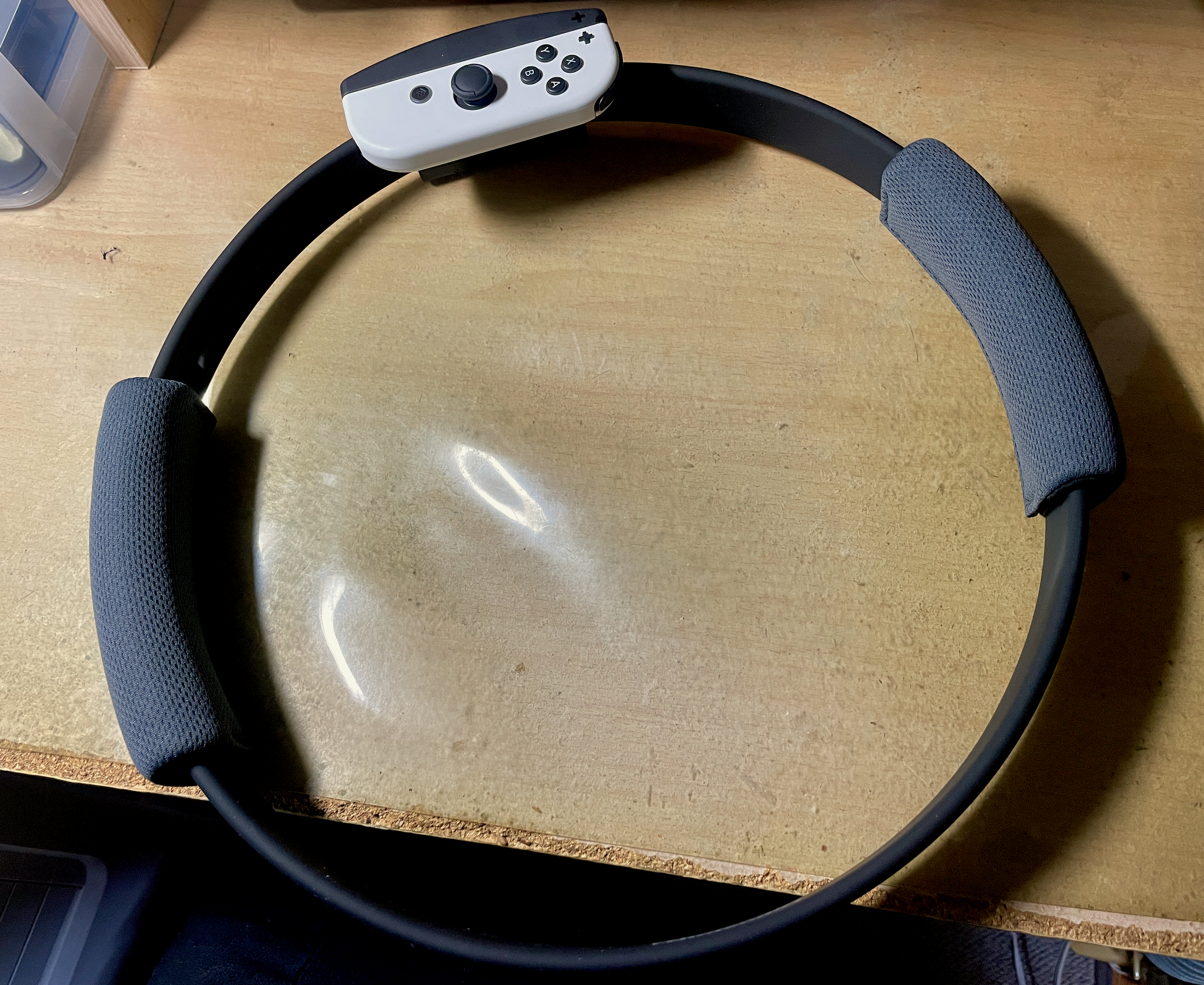
The Ring-Con controller for the game

The game was first teased in early September 2019 with a video showing people using the Ring-Con and Leg Strap without showing the game, with a full announcement of the game a week later.

Several journalists observed that the game fits into Nintendo's long-running "quality of life" program, to introduce more physical activity into the playing of video games, that had been started by Satoru Iwata with the introduction of the Wii console, particularly in the game Wii Fit. Parts of the design of the Nintendo Switch had been from player feedback from Wii Fit looking to make the controllers smaller so they could be strapped to the body and used in more possible ways.

Ring Fit Adventure was released in North America on October 18, 2019. The game, shipping with the Ring-Con and Leg Strap, costs slightly more than a typical game.

On March 26, 2020, a free update was released, adding a rhythm game mode.

== Reception ==
Reception

Aggregate score
Aggregator	Score
Metacritic	83/100

Review scores
Publication	Score
Destructoid	8/10
Digital Trends	4.5/5
GameSpot	9/10
GamesRadar+	4/5
IGN	7.8/10
Jeuxvideo.com	16/20
Nintendo Life	8/10
RPGamer	4.0/5
Shacknews	8/10
VG247	4/5

Ring Fit Adventure received "generally favorable" reviews, according to review aggregator website Metacritic, with a score of 83/100. It has also been rated on IGN as 7.8/10. Critics agreed that, while not designed for strength training, it was effective exercise for maintaining fitness. As well, they found its RPG elements to be simplistic, which made it more accessible to casual players, but could be disappointing those who wanted more of a strategic challenge. Writing for GameSpot, Jenae Sitzes awarded the game 9/10, saying it built on the legacy of Wii Fit and repositioned its messaging around fitness in a healthier and more constructive way, and that its large volume of content kept the campaign's progression engaging.

=== Sales ===
Ring Fit Adventure debuted at #3 in the UK, and #1 in Japan and South Korea. In Japan, it sold 68,497 copies within its first week on sale, which placed it at number one on the all format sales chart. By December 2019, the game had shipped 2.17 million units worldwide.

Demand for the game exceeded Nintendo's expectations, creating shortages.

On June 18, 2020, it was confirmed that Ring Fit Adventure had sold over one million copies in Japan, where it shipped a total of 1,006,069 copies across the region.

From launch to September 2020, the game has sold 5.84 million units worldwide.

As of March 31, 2022, the game sold 14.09 million copies making it one of the best-selling Nintendo Switch games.

By March 31, 2023, 15.38 million copies of the game were sold worldwide.

=== Awards ===
The game was nominated for "Best Family Game" at The Game Awards 2019, for "Family Game of the Year" at the 23rd Annual D.I.C.E. Awards, and for "Game Beyond Entertainment" at the 16th British Academy Games Awards.

=== Potential benefits of exergames ===
Exergames such as Wii Fit, Kinect, and Ring Fit have been the subject of research for their potential for therapeutic and health benefit. Studies have shown potential use of exergaming in lowering BMI and improving mobility, especially in older individuals.
