= Hisashi Nogami =

Japanese video game designer (born 1971)

- 野上恒
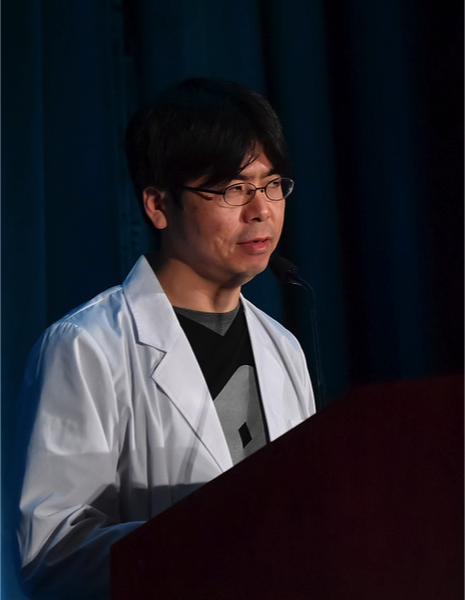
- Nogami at the 2018 Game Developers Conference event
- Born: 1971 (age 54–55); Yawata, Kyoto, Japan
- Education: Osaka University of Arts
- Occupations: Video game designer, director and producer
- Years active: 1994–present
- Employer: Nintendo
- Notable work: Animal Crossing; Splatoon
- Title: Manager at Nintendo EAD (2013-2015); Manager at Nintendo EPD Production Group No. 5 (2015-2019); Deputy General Manager at Nintendo EPD (2019-present)

Hisashi Nogami (野上恒, Nogami Hisashi; born 1971) is a Japanese video game designer, director, and producer at Nintendo. He is best known for his involvement in the Animal Crossing and Splatoon franchises.

== Biography ==
Nogami was born in Yawata, Kyoto Prefecture in 1971. He graduated from the Design Department in the Osaka University of Arts during April 1994 and joined Japanese video game company Nintendo within the same year, becoming an artist for Super Mario World 2: Yoshi's Island on the Super Nintendo Entertainment System. Several years later, Nogami went on to produce the Animal Crossing series, Splatoon series, and directed development of the Wii's Mii Channel among other projects. In June 2019, after years being Manager of his own group of development at Nintendo, he was promoted to the position of Deputy General Manager within the company's Entertainment Planning & Development division.

== Works ==
Year	Game	Credit(s)
1995	Yoshi's Island	Character design
1995	BS Zelda no Densetsu	Designer
1996	Super Mario 64	CG Illustrator
1996	Tetris Attack	Advisor
1996	Mario Kart 64	CG character design
1997	Yoshi's Story	CG design
1998	Banjo-Kazooie	Word swapping
2000	Mario Artist: Talent Studio	Advisor
2001	Animal Crossing	Director
2002	Yoshi's Island: Super Mario Advance 3	Map support
2004	Yoshi Topsy-Turvy	Supervisor
2005	Animal Crossing: Wild World	Director
2006	Yoshi's Island DS	Supervisor
2006	Mii Channel	Director
2006	Wii Sports	Mii support
2006	Wii Play	Mii support
2008	Personal Trainer: Walking	Mii support
2008	Animal Crossing: City Folk	Director
2009	Tomodachi Collection	Mii support
2012	WaraWara Plaza	Director
2013	Tomodachi Life	Mii support
2015	Splatoon	Producer
2015	Animal Crossing: Happy Home Designer	Producer
2015	Animal Crossing: Amiibo Festival	Producer
2016	Animal Crossing: New Leaf - Welcome amiibo	Producer
2017	Splatoon 2	Producer
2017	Animal Crossing: Pocket Camp	Supervisor
2020	Animal Crossing: New Horizons	Producer
2022	Splatoon 3	Producer
2025	Drag x Drive	Producer
2026	Yoshi and the Mysterious Book	Producer
2026	Splatoon Raiders	General producer
