= Yoshi's Woolly World =

2015 video game

- Developer: Good-Feel
- Publisher: Nintendo
- Director: Atsushi Kono
- Producers: Etsunobu Ebisu; Keita Kawaminami; Takashi Tezuka
- Designer: Yosuke Suda
- Programmer: Hironori Kuraoka
- Artist: Ayano Otsuka
- Composers: Tomoya Tomita; Misaki Asada; Kazumi Totaka
- Series: Yoshi
- Platforms: Wii U, Nintendo 3DS
- Release: Wii U: AU: June 25, 2015; EU: June 26, 2015; JP: July 16, 2015; NA: October 16, 2015; Nintendo 3DS: JP: January 19, 2017; NA/EU: February 3, 2017; AU: February 4, 2017
- Genre: Platform
- Modes: Single-player, multiplayer

Yoshi's Woolly World (Note: Known in Japan as Yoshi Wool World (ヨッシーウールワールド, Yosshī Ūru Wārudo)) is a 2015 platform game developed by Good-Feel and published by Nintendo for the Wii U. Following Yoshi's New Island (2014), it is the seventh main installment in the Yoshi series and the third released for a home console, marking the first home console entry in over 17 years since 1997's Yoshi's Story. The game also serves as the spiritual successor to 2010's Kirby's Epic Yarn. The game features two Yoshis on their quest to rescue their friends, who have been converted to bundles of yarn by Kamek in order to create a new castle for Baby Bowser.

Like Kirby's Epic Yarn, Yoshi's Woolly World utilizes an art style with characters and the environment made of yarn, with gameplay centering on the material's unique properties in addition to the series' core gameplay; Yoshi in the game produces yarn balls with various uses instead of eggs, while also being able to transform into multiple forms similar to Kirby in Kirby's Epic Yarn.

A port for the Nintendo 3DS, known as Poochy & Yoshi's Woolly World, (Note: Known in Japan as With Poochy! Yoshi Wool World (ポチと！ ヨッシー ウールワールド, Pochi to! Yosshī Ūru Wārudo)) was released worldwide in early 2017. Both versions received generally favorable reviews, with reviewers praising the art style, gameplay, and innovation, but criticizing the easy difficulty. The next game in the series, Yoshi's Crafted World, was released in 2019 for the Nintendo Switch.

== Gameplay ==
E3 2014 screenshot of Yoshi's Woolly World. The characters and environment are depicted as living yarn knits, a theme that continues throughout the game.

Yoshi's Woolly World is a platform game in which players assume the role of Yoshi. Similar to games like Good-Feel's Kirby's Epic Yarn, the game is set in a world where the characters and environment are composed of yarn and cloth. Yoshi retains much of his moveset from the Yoshi's Island series, including using his tongue to swallow enemies and using his flutter jump to reach high areas. Many elements such as flowers and mystery clouds also return. However, unlike other games where swallowing enemies would produce eggs which Yoshi could then throw, Yoshi instead produces balls of yarn. These yarn balls have various uses when thrown, such as tying up enemies or filling in certain platforms and objects. Players can also gather white chicks in certain levels, which produce temporary cloud platforms when thrown. The game also supports up to two players cooperatively. With both players able to swallow and throw their partners, allowing them to reach otherwise inaccessible areas. In addition, some sections give Yoshi special transformations, such as a motorbike or umbrella.

Throughout each level, Yoshi can pick up beads, which can be spent on Power Badges. These can support the player during a level, such as granting more powerful attacks, or the ability to recover when falling into bottomless pits. Each level contains five Flowers, five Wonder Wools, and twenty Stamp Patches, which are hidden behind certain beads. Flowers increase the odds of entering a bonus game at the end of the level, and collecting all Flowers within a world opens up a secret level. Finding all the Yarn Bundles within a level unlocks a new pattern of Yoshi, which players can switch to while on the overworld map. Collecting enough Stamp Patches unlocks special stamps that can be used in Miiverse posts; the 3DS version has instead Pencil Patches which gives predefinite models for its exclusive Yoshi customization mode. At any point in the game, players can toggle between Classic Mode and Mellow Mode, the latter of which gives Yoshi a pair of wings, allowing less skilled players to fly indefinitely through a stage. Poochy and Yoshi's Woolly World has a unique mode where the player controls Poochy through a level, with only the ability to crouch and jump, running to collect Poochy Pups and beads.

The game features compatibility with Amiibo figures, including a unique knitted Yarn Yoshi Amiibo. Using any Yoshi Amiibo allows players to create a duplicate Yoshi during Solo Play, allowing solo players to replicate actions otherwise only available in Co-op Play. Additionally, the Yarn Yoshi Amiibo can be used to save a design based on another character. Other compatible figures, such as Mario and Donkey Kong, can be used to unlock additional patterns based on the respective character. The game is playable with the Wii U GamePad, Wii Remote, Wii Classic Controller, and Wii U Pro Controller.

== Plot ==
On a knitted island filled with many Yarn Yoshis of varying patterns, the evil Magikoopa Kamek turns nearly all the Yoshis into bundles of yarn for his master Baby Bowser, scattering them across different worlds. However, two of the Yoshis manage to avoid being transformed themselves, and they set off to pursue Kamek and rescue their woolly friends.

After traveling through six different worlds, Yoshi manages to storm Baby Bowser's castle. When Yoshi confronts Baby Bowser in his castle, it is revealed that Kamek stole the yarn so that he could use it to construct a new castle for Baby Bowser. After Yoshi defeats Baby Bowser, Kamek instead uses the yarn to enlarge Baby Bowser into a giant. After Yoshi defeats Baby Bowser again, Baby Bowser reverts to his normal size, and the Yoshis rescue their friends from Kamek and Baby Bowser. Kamek and Baby Bowser try to fly away, but crash land on the moon, where they are left deserted by the Yoshis.

After the end of the game, Poochy can be seen at the back of the moon, sticking his tongue out happily.

== Development ==
Yoshi's Woolly World was first announced by Nintendo CEO Satoru Iwata on January 23, 2013, under the tentative title Yarn Yoshi, which showcased different gameplay mechanics and an art style similar to Kirby's Epic Yarn. The game was stated to be in development by Good-Feel with game designer Takashi Tezuka supervising the project. The game was absent from E3 2013, but was playable at E3 2014, where it was given a tentative release time frame of "the first half of 2015". The soundtrack was handled by Good-Feel composers Tomoya Tomita (now freelance) and Misaki Asada, with the exception of the main theme, which was written by Nintendo's Kazumi Totaka.

== Release ==
Special editions of the Wii U's version's retail release bundle the game with the knitted Yarn Yoshi Amiibo, which is available in one of three colors; green, blue, and pink. Bundles included the game with a single Yarn Yoshi Amiibo, or all three. Players who purchased the game on the European Nintendo eShop before July 23, 2015, received a free download code for a Virtual Console version of the Nintendo DS title Yoshi Touch & Go.

A port for the Nintendo 3DS, known as Poochy & Yoshi's Woolly World, (Note: Known in Japan as With Poochy! Yoshi Wool World (ポチと！ ヨッシー ウールワールド, Pochi to! Yosshī Ūru Wārudo)) was released worldwide in early 2017. It contains a unique mode where the player controls Poochy through a level, with only the ability to crouch and jump, running to collect Poochy Pups and beads. Instead of Stamp Patches, the port contains Pencil Patches, which give predefined models for its exclusive Yoshi customization mode. A Poochy amiibo was released alongside the retail release.

== Reception ==
=== Critical response ===
Yoshi's Woolly World (and Poochy)

Aggregate scores
| Aggregator | Score | |
| Aggregator | 3DS | Wii U |
|---|---|---|
| Metacritic | 77/100 | 78/100 |
| OpenCritic | 59% recommend | 70% recommend |

Review scores
| Publication | Score | |
| Publication | 3DS | Wii U |
|---|---|---|
| 4Players | 78/100 | 78/100 |
| Destructoid | 7/10 | 7/10 |
| Edge | 6/10 | 6/10 |
| Electronic Gaming Monthly | N/A | 9/10 |
| Game Informer | 8.5/10 | 8.5/10 |
| GameRevolution | N/A | 4/5 |
| GameSpot | 7/10 | 6/10 |
| GamesRadar+ | 4/5 | N/A |
| GamesTM | 7/10 | 8/10 |
| GameTrailers | N/A | 8/10 |
| Hardcore Gamer | N/A | 4/5 |
| IGN | 7.1/10 | 7.4/10 |
| Nintendo Life | 9/10 | 9/10 |
| Nintendo World Report | 8/10 | 8.5/10 |
| Shacknews | N/A | 8/10 |
| USgamer | 3.5/5 | 3.5/5 |
| VideoGamer.com | N/A | 6/10 |

Yoshi's Woolly World received generally favorable reviews, receiving an aggregated score of 78/100 on the review aggregation website Metacritic based on 83 reviews. Critics praised the art style and innovation but criticized the difficulty as too easy.

GameSpot's Rob Crossley gave the game a score of 6/10, saying "You don't need to collect a single hidden item on your journey from 1-1 to the final boss. Some would say that gives Woolly World its inherent accessibility, in that players aren't forced to take the hard road. But if you want to be fully entertained, the hard road is the only real option. It is your own degree of curiosity, and your compulsive nature, that will determine which route you'll take."

IGN's Daniel Krupa gave the game a moderately positive review, saying: "It's incredibly familiar, but the imaginative and attractive art style makes it feel fresh and appealing. Outside of those great few levels, Woolly World is a more forgettable and fragmented experience. Cool mechanics are cooked up, but they're dropped into levels which never realise their full potential and fixate more on unearthing frustrating collectibles."

Nintendo Life's Thomas Whitehead stated that the game featured "some of Nintendo's best co-op platforming" with "clever, witty stage design" and "gorgeous" visuals, but found that boss fights were "repetitive and disappointing".

The 3DS version received similarly positive reception, also receiving an aggregated score of 77/100 on Metacritic, based on 56 reviews. Reviewers applauded the port for being a successful transition of the original game to a handheld, though some complaints were raised over the visual downgrade and lack of local multiplayer, with Whitehead describing it as "certainly a pity if not entirely surprising".

=== Sales ===
Yoshi's Woolly World launched in Japan with roughly 31,000 physical copies sold, and after two weeks, 43,000 copies were sold. In the UK, it entered the charts in fourth place. As of March 31, 2016, the game had worldwide sales of 1.37 million copies. The Nintendo 3DS version of the game sold 80 percent of its initial shipment in Japan, but only entered the UK charts in twentieth place.
