= Yoshi's Safari =

1993 video game

- North American box art
- Developer: Nintendo R&D1
- Publisher: Nintendo
- Series: Yoshi, Mario
- Platform: Super NES
- Release: JP: July 14, 1993; NA: September 1993; PAL: November 19, 1993; BR: December 1993
- Genre: Light gun shooter
- Modes: Single-player, multiplayer

Yoshi's Safari (Note: Known in Japan as Yoshi's Road Hunting (Japanese: ヨッシーのロードハンティング, Hepburn: Yosshī no Rōdo Hantingu)) is a 1993 light gun shooter developed and published by Nintendo for its Super Nintendo Entertainment System (SNES). It is the only Mario franchise game to feature first-person shooter gameplay and requires the SNES's Super Scope, a light gun. As Mario and his pet dinosaur Yoshi, the player embarks on a quest to save the kingdom of Jewelry Land from Bowser and his Koopalings, who have kidnapped its rulers and stolen 12 gems. The game features 12 levels in which the player shoots enemies like Goombas and Koopas, and collects power-ups and coins. At the end of each level, the player engages in a boss fight with an enemy, a Koopaling, or Bowser. Nintendo commissioned its R&D1 department to develop Yoshi's Safari in response to the waning popularity of the Super Scope. Yoshi's Safari was the first Super Scope title to use the SNES's Mode 7 graphics mode, and the future of the peripheral depended on the game's performance.

The game received positive reviews from video game journalists, who commended its presentation—particularly the visuals—and gameplay; some labelled it the best Super Scope title. However, it received criticism for its short length and low difficulty level. The game garnered little attention and failed commercially, attributed to its launch coinciding with a controversy surrounding the SNES rerelease of the popular arcade game Mortal Kombat (1992). Most of Yoshi's Safari's additions to the Mario lore were ignored in subsequent games, and it has never been rereleased.

== Gameplay ==
The player (from the perspective of Mario) and Yoshi fight a Koopa Troopa piloting a mech.

Yoshi's Safari is a light gun shooter viewed from a first-person perspective. The game features 12 levels and requires the Super Scope, a light gun peripheral for the Super Nintendo Entertainment System (SNES), to be played. The player views gameplay from the perspective of Mario riding on his pet dinosaur Yoshi's back and uses the Super Scope to shoot enemies, which include the Mario franchise's traditional Goombas, Koopas, and Cheep-Cheeps. As the player fires the Super Scope, a power gauge will drop; firing too rapidly will deplete it and cause long pauses between shots, making players more vulnerable to enemy attacks. The game features a multiplayer mode in which one player controls Mario using the Super Scope and another controls Yoshi using an SNES controller; players can switch roles if they wish to experience both perspectives. In the single-player mode, Yoshi is controlled automatically.

After selecting a level from the overworld, the player must clear it within a time limit. In addition to enemies, the player shoots blocks with question marks to earn coins, and will earn an extra life by collecting 60. The player loses lives if enemies deplete their health bar, if they fall down a pit with less than three coins, or if they fail to complete the level within the allotted time. Losing all lives results in a game over, forcing the player to restart. The levels feature branching paths leading to different enemies and prizes, though they always end on the same path, which leads to a boss fight. Bosses include the Koopalings piloting giant mechs, bigger versions of normal enemies, and Bowser. Power-ups, such as mushrooms, flowers, and stars, provide the player with extra health, firepower, and invincibility. Some power-ups can only be used during boss battles.

Yoshi's Safari is set in Jewelry Land—a location similar to the Mushroom Kingdom—and features a simple story. Series antagonist Bowser and his Koopalings kidnap Jewelry Land rulers King Fret and Prince Pine, and steal the 12 magic gems that protect the kingdom from harm, causing an earthquake that splits it in two. One of the Koopalings, Iggy, designs powerful mechs that aid Bowser's army in their invasion. Princess Peach sends Mario and Yoshi on a quest to defeat Bowser, retrieve the gems, and set the two rulers free. When the player completes the game, they will be given a cheat code that, when input at the title screen, increases the difficulty level. The game also has a leaderboard to encourage multiple playthroughs and so players can keep track of their scores.

== Development ==
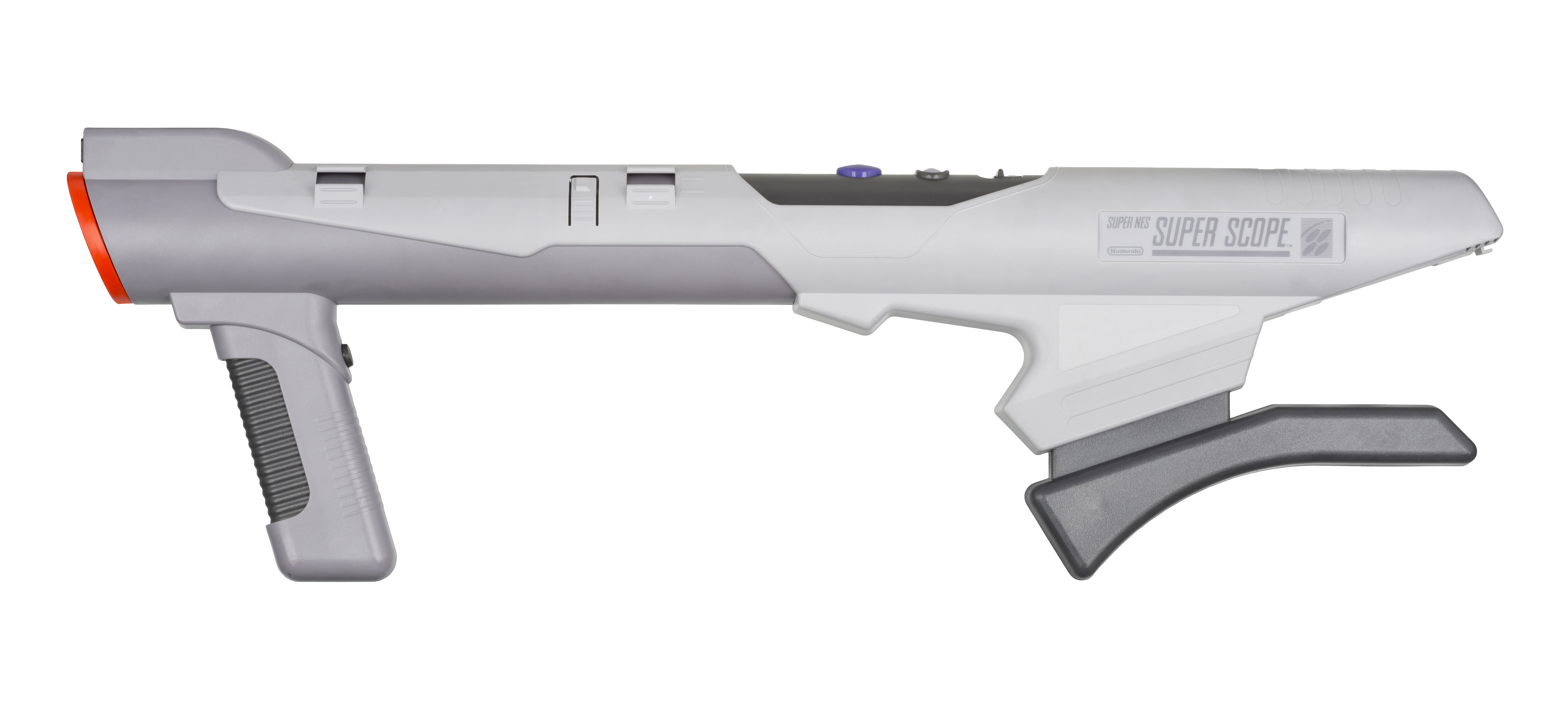
A Super Scope

In February 1992, Nintendo released the Super Scope, a successor to its popular NES Zapper for the Nintendo Entertainment System. At the time, Nintendo was in fierce competition with Sega, a company known for its "cool" games and advertising, and needed an edge over this new rival. Unlike its predecessor, the Super Scope was only a moderate success and by 1993 risked fading into obscurity. Nintendo management realized the peripheral's relevance was waning and commissioned the company's R&D1 department to develop a Super Scope game featuring Mario. The future of the Super Scope depended on the performance of this game. Yoshi's Safari was the first Super Scope game to use the SNES's Mode 7 graphics mode, which created an impression of 3D computer graphics and made the gameplay more realistic.

Nintendo released Yoshi's Safari in Japan on July 14, 1993 under the title Yoshi's Road Hunting, and in North America the following September. It was released in PAL regions also in 1993. The title did not garner much attention upon release. Its North American launch coincided with the rerelease of the popular arcade game Mortal Kombat (1992), a game controversial for its violence, for the SNES and Sega's Genesis. According to IGN, Nintendo's decision to soften the blood and gore in the SNES version drew public attention away from Yoshi's Safari.

== Reception and legacy ==
Reception

Review scores
Publication	Score
Electronic Gaming Monthly	6/10, 6/10, 7/10, 7/10, 4/10 (Note: Electronic Gaming Monthly's five reviewers provided scores out of ten.)
Famitsu	7/10, 7/10, 7/10, 5/10
Official Nintendo Magazine	77/100
Joypad	83%
Power Unlimited	80/100

While Yoshi's Safari failed commercially, which IGN attributed to its reliance on the Super Scope and the Mortal Kombat debacle, it did receive praise from video game journalists. The presentation—particularly the visuals—were well received. Joypad, Electronic Gaming Monthly (EGM), and Nintendo Magazine System considered the graphics and smooth scrolling among the game's highlights. Joypad wrote the animation was fluid and Nintendo Magazine System wrote the graphics suited the Mario theme, while Nintendo Power called the characters colorful and bright. The Los Angeles Times praised the game's use of Mode 7, describing the graphics as excellent and colorful. Joypad and Nintendo Magazine System both praised the music, with Joypad writing it was simple but still sounded good.

Critics also commended the gameplay, with Joypad and Nintendo Magazine System calling Yoshi's Safari the best Super Scope title. Joypad praised the multiplayer mode and wrote that while the game was somewhat expensive, it was worth buying for Super Scope owners. The game had more depth than other Super Scope titles, Nintendo Magazine System wrote, because of its variety and branching level paths. Joypad and Nintendo Power respectively praised the controls as responsive and easy to use. However, the game's short length and low difficulty were primary aspects of criticism. Nintendo Magazine System's reviewers said they finished the entire game in one sitting and estimated it would provide at most a week of entertainment, while EGM wrote players "may be tempted to turn your SuperScope [sic] on yourself and end it all!" Nintendo Magazine System and Nintendo Power suggested the game was geared toward a younger audience, with the former stating beginning players would find enjoyment but experienced ones would be left wanting more. Power Unlimited gave the game a score of 80%, they found the gameplay to be "original, looks good and is fun to play. Very easy."

Yoshi's Safari's failure signified that the Super Scope was commercially nonviable for Nintendo. Mario and Yoshi creator Shigeru Miyamoto, who was working on Super Mario World 2: Yoshi's Island (1995) at the time, disliked Yoshi's Safari and strove to make his game feel more authentic. Games starring Yoshi did not gain much popularity until Yoshi's Island, and Yoshi's Safari remains relatively obscure. The title's additions to the Mario lore, such as Jewelry Land, were ignored in subsequent games. Yoshi's Safari is notable for being the first Mario game to refer to the Princess as "Peach" instead of "Toadstool" in Western territories, although this did not stick until Super Mario 64 (1996). Nintendo would later revive old games from its back catalog through its Virtual Console service, but Yoshi's Safari has never been rereleased, and IGN noted its 25th anniversary passed in 2018 with little fanfare. The game remains the sole first-person shooter in the Mario franchise.

IGN lamented the obscurity of Yoshi's Safari in a 2019 retrospective and felt it deserved more recognition, writing the game was and still is a standout in the Mario franchise. The title's "quirky aspects", IGN wrote—such as its science fiction theme (in contrast to previous Mario games' fantasy one), upbeat music, and use of the Super Scope—paved way for the franchise's more experimental games such as Mario + Rabbids Kingdom Battle (2017): "while far from perfect, [Yoshi's Safari] was still ahead of its time in certain regards." The writer also called it "a shame" the game has never been rereleased.
