= Yoshi and the Mysterious Book =

2026 video game

- Cover art depicting Yoshi surrounded by illustrations of interactable creatures
- Developer: Good-Feel
- Publisher: Nintendo
- Director: Masahiro Yamamoto
- Producers: Kentaro Sei; Takashi Tezuka; Hisashi Nogami
- Designers: Tatsumi Watanabe; Akari Ikeda; Yusuke Tsuyuki
- Programmers: Daisuke Kobayashi; Satoshi Kobayashi
- Artist: Kazumasa Yonetani
- Writer: Keita Kawaminami
- Composer: Kumi Tanioka
- Series: Yoshi
- Engine: Unreal Engine 5
- Platform: Nintendo Switch 2
- Release: May 21, 2026
- Genre: Platform
- Mode: Single-player

Yoshi and the Mysterious Book (Note: Japanese: ヨッシーとフカシギの図鑑, Hepburn: Yosshī to Fukashigi no Zukan; lit. "Yoshi and the Indescribable Illustrated Encyclopedia") is a 2026 platform game developed by Good-Feel and published by Nintendo for the Nintendo Switch 2. The game follows Yoshi as he enters a living encyclopedia, where he seeks and interacts with peculiar creatures in the book's pages in order to solve puzzles, complete objectives, and traverse through levels. Released on May 21, 2026, the game succeeded Yoshi's Crafted World (2019) as the ninth main installment in the Yoshi series and the fifth released for a home console. It received generally positive reviews.

== Gameplay ==
Yoshi, having given an apple to a bubble spouting creature, rides in a large bubble created from the action. A star is given to the player for discovering this interaction.

Yoshi and the Mysterious Book is a side-scrolling platform game set primarily in a living encyclopedia called "Mr. E".

The premise revolves around the player character, a friendly dinosaur known as Yoshi, as he enters Mr. E's pages in order to search for and interact with various creatures. Each level, or chapter, of the game has different creatures, each with unique attributes. When Yoshi finds a creature, he can utilize its traits and abilities to solve puzzles and traverse levels. The world inside Mr. E's pages is animated in a style similar to traditional stop-motion animation, with a lower frame rate in certain character actions such as when jumping.

== Plot ==
Bowser's son, Bowser Jr., discovers an old encyclopedia that gives information on many unique creatures. Bowser Jr. leaves his father's castle in search of one of the encyclopedia's creatures called the Bewilder Bird, but ends up accidentally teleporting himself into the book with a magical monocle.

The book ends up falling on an island populated by a group of Yoshis and suddenly gains consciousness, introducing himself as "Mister Encyclopedia" ("Mr. E" for short). The Yoshis help Mr. E by teleporting inside his pages, studying the habits of each of the book's creatures, and naming them. As the Yoshis discover more and more odd critters, they have several run-ins with Bowser Jr. and Kamek, who are still searching for the Bewilder Bird. Kamek mistakes Bowser Jr. for Bowser's younger self due to having been lost inside Mr. E's pages for a long time.

The Yoshis eventually discover the Bewilder Bird, who is revealed to have the ability to transform into any other creature shown in the book. With the Bewilder Bird's help, the Yoshis manage to defeat Bowser Jr. and Kamek before the Bewilder Bird's parent scares the two Koopas away. Afterwards, Mr. E reveals that he was created by a professor in order to protect all of the creatures that the Yoshis discovered from extinction before requesting more help from the Yoshis in discovering more facts about the creatures, which the Yoshis agree to.

After Kamek returns with Bowser Jr. back to Bowser's castle, he finds Bowser as an adult and Bowser Jr. as his son, which he then starts crying for all the years he missed.

== Development ==
Yoshi and the Mysterious Book was developed by Good-Feel, who previously developed the Yoshi titles Woolly World (2015) and Crafted World (2019).

The game was initially produced by Takashi Tezuka before being replaced by Hisashi Nogami due to Tezuka's involvement with Super Mario Bros. Wonder (2023). According to Nintendo DREAM magazine, The Mysterious Book was originally planned as a Nintendo Switch game before being moved to Nintendo Switch 2. Furthermore, a 2026 Famitsu interview with Shigeru Miyamoto confirmed that Yoshi's inclusion in The Super Mario Galaxy Movie (2026) encouraged development on The Mysterious Book.

The Mysterious Book was announced in a Nintendo Direct presentation on September 12, 2025, as a part of the 40th anniversary of Super Mario Bros. (1985), revealing gameplay mechanics such as interacting with creatures. On March 10, 2026, for the celebration of Mario Day, a trailer was released detailing further gameplay features and announced the game's release date as May 21, 2026. The game uses Unreal Engine 5.

== Reception ==
Reception

Aggregate scores
Aggregator	Score
Metacritic	80/100 (Note: Based on 116 reviews)
OpenCritic	82% recommend (Note: Based on 106 reviews)

Review scores
Publication	Score
Destructoid	8.5/10
Famitsu	9/10, 9/10, 8/10, 9/10
GamesRadar+	8/10
IGN	6/10
Nintendo Life	6/10
Video Games Chronicle	10/10

Yoshi and the Mysterious Book received "generally favorable" reviews according to the review aggregator website Metacritic, with 82% of critics recommending the title according to OpenCritic. In Japan, four reviewers from Famitsu gave the game a total score of 35 out of 40.

Andy Robinson of Video Games Chronicle gave the game a perfect score, praising the title's discovery elements, large amount of unique and deep creatures, and accessibility. Jenni Lada, writing for Siliconera, called the Mysterious Book "unusual", "experimental", and an "entirely new type of experience", which led her to give it a positive review. Destructoid writer Scott Duwe was generally positive, stating that the game got better as it progressed, and praising its relative lack of handholding, but noting its length to be "short-ish". Heather Wald of GamesRadar+ was positive, praising the game's naming mechanic and sense of discovery, but hoped that "[one] day[,] we see Yoshi get even more ambitious".

Nintendo Life writer Ollie Reynolds' review was one of the most critical, giving it a mixed score and noting it to be repetitive. IGN's Tom Marks was similarly mixed.

=== Sales ===
In Japan, Yoshi and the Mysterious Book sold 39,661 physical copies during its first week of release, ranking as the second best-selling retail game in the country for that period.

=== Awards ===
The game was nominated for "Best Family Game" at The Game Awards 2026.
