= Yoshi's Crafted World =

2019 video game

- Icon artwork
- Developer: Good-Feel
- Publisher: Nintendo
- Director: Masahiro Yamamoto
- Producers: Etsunobu Ebisu; Takashi Tezuka
- Designer: Yosuke Suda
- Programmer: Yasuhiro Masuoka
- Artist: Ayano Otsuka
- Composer: Kazufumi Umeda
- Series: Yoshi
- Engine: Unreal Engine 4
- Platform: Nintendo Switch
- Release: March 29, 2019
- Genre: Platform
- Modes: Single-player, multiplayer

Yoshi's Crafted World (Note: Known in Japan as Yoshi Craft World (Japanese: ヨッシークラフトワールド, Hepburn: Yosshī Kurafuto Wārudo)) is a 2019 platform video game developed by Good-Feel and published by Nintendo for the Nintendo Switch. Serving as a spin-off of the Mario franchise and the spiritual successor to Yoshi's Woolly World (2015), it is the eighth main installment in the Yoshi series and the fourth released for a home console. The game was revealed at E3 2017 and was released worldwide on March 29, 2019.

Yoshi's Crafted World follows the Yoshis as they venture to collect the scattered gems of the Sundream Stone, which has the ability to grant wishes, before Kamek and Baby Bowser can.

The game received generally positive reviews from critics, who praised its visuals, level design, and gameplay, though the soundtrack and lack of difficulty elicited criticism. Yoshi's Crafted World sold more than one million copies worldwide in three days and more than three million units by December 2022, making it one of the best-selling games on the Nintendo Switch. The game was succeeded by Yoshi and the Mysterious Book for the Nintendo Switch 2 in 2026.

== Gameplay ==
Yoshi's Crafted World allows the player to view the game from two opposite viewpoints, allowing the camera to "flip sides" to see behind objects. Here, the player collects coins inside of a house from the outside (top) and inside (bottom) perspective.

The game is a side-scrolling platformer where 3D characters are moved on a 2.5D plane. The player is also able to move and interact in a third dimension, with travel forwards and backwards enabled in sections of levels, and the ability to throw eggs at scenery and other elements of the foreground and background. Outside of this new mechanic, the game plays similar to prior Yoshi games, in which the player may use Yoshi's tongue to eat enemies or other objects, turn them into eggs, and throw them outwardly into the level. As in previous Yoshi games, flowers can be found in levels, which can be used to unlock paths on the world map.

In addition to the frontside, each level also has a backside, which can be played after completion. Players must find up to three Poochy Pups there and bring them to the finish line, for which they receive one flower per returned Poochy Pup. If they succeed in doing so within the given time period, they receive another flower. Each level has a variety of collectibles to obtain, each requiring different conditions to find. In addition to the Smiley Flowers strewn about each level, obtaining all of the collectibles of another type will give the player another Smiley Flower. Players do not need to collect all the collectibles in one run; previously obtained Smiley Flowers and Red Coins will remain translucent upon replays. Some collectibles are found in presents in the background.

Smiley Flowers are used to unlock new subworlds by paying a "toll" to the Blockafeller resting in front of it. Once all of them are collected, they can be paid to the big Blockafeller in Hidden Hills to unlock the Sundream Stone costume. Getting all the Smiley Flowers in a subworld will adorn the diorama with festive pinwheel flowers.

Blockafellers appear in each subworld to provide the Yoshis with missions to find souvenirs in the form of crafts, themed decorations that appear in the foreground or background. One at a time, Yoshi will be requested to find a certain number of the souvenir in a certain level. Once Yoshi finds and throws eggs at each of them, he can leave the level immediately, or continue to play through. Either way, after returning to the world map, the Blockafeller will give Yoshi a Smiley Flower as a reward and, if there are still uncollected souvenirs in the subworld, request another type of souvenir.

Similarly, a small Blockafeller named Sprout can be found hiding in every level, on the ground, once Baby Bowser is defeated. Although he does not give Smiley Flowers for being found, finding him in every level will award a costume based on himself.

The game features a two-player multiplayer mode, where each player maneuvers their own Yoshi through the game's levels.

== Plot ==
The story opens on the Yoshis, who live peacefully on the eponymous Yoshi's Island. At the topmost peak of the island sits an artifact known as the Sundream Stone, which possesses the power to "make anyone's wildest dreams come true" using its five Dream Gems. One day, Kamek and Baby Bowser attempt to steal the stone, causing its gems to be sent flying across multiple worlds and leaving Yoshi and his friends to recover them.

For most of the game, the Sundream Stone rests in a dark forest, guarded by the Yoshis not exploring. Each time the Yoshis reattach a Dream Gem, the forest becomes brighter and the Stone regains the color of the gem. In the final level, the Yoshis find the last Dream Gem, only for Kamek and Baby Bowser to steal it along with the Sundream Stone and the four other gems. Baby Bowser then uses the stone to create The Great King Bowser, a giant robot that serves as the penultimate boss. After the robot is defeated, Kamek uses the stone to enlarge Baby Bowser, leading to the final boss fight against Mega Baby Bowser. Following Baby Bowser's defeat, the Yoshis reattach the Dream Gems (which were detached once again after the battle against Mega Baby Bowser) to fully restore the Sundream Stone, which, with the Yoshis' dreams, creates an airship that is used to fly all of them back to Yoshi's Island.

== Development ==
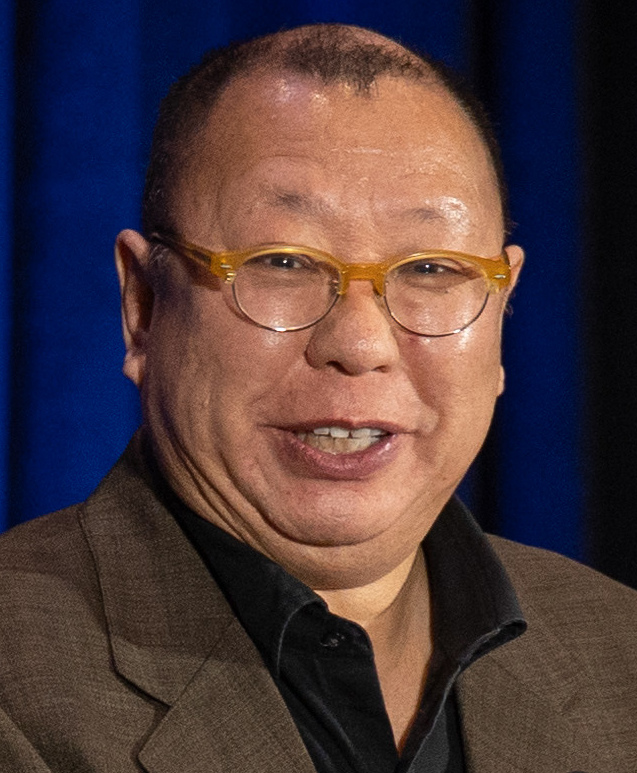
Producer Takashi Tezuka

The game was announced at E3 2017 and was scheduled for a 2018 release. Footage of the game was shown during the Nintendo Treehouse Live event at E3 2017, where footage of the front and backsides of multiple levels were shown. The reveal footage showed the game taking a cardboard cutout-type art style for the game's graphics, similar to how Yoshi's Woolly World was themed around characters and worlds made out of wool and Kirby's Epic Yarn with its yarn-based themes. The game was built using Unreal Engine 4. In June 2018, Nintendo confirmed that the game was delayed and would be released in 2019. In January 2019, Nintendo announced in a standalone tweet that Yoshi's Crafted World would release on March 29, 2019. In the final game, it appears as though the ability to "flip" the world has been overhauled since its reveal, as overall emphasis on the mechanic has been lowered dramatically. Certain auxiliary mechanics shown off at the reveal, such as the ability to flip the viewpoint in multiplayer via a simultaneous ground-pound maneuver, have been removed completely, and instead the flipping mechanic exists as a second bonus "run" through a level, in which Yoshi must find several "Poochy Pups" and bring them to the goal. The game supports all Amiibo, most of them granting players random crafted costumes. Any Mario-related Amiibo, however, including the Yoshi soft dolls from Woolly World, granted players special costumes based on the character used.

== Reception ==
=== Critical response ===
Reception

Aggregate scores
Aggregator	Score
Metacritic	79/100
OpenCritic	81% recommend

Review scores
Publication	Score
4Players	83/100
Destructoid	7.5/10
Easy Allies	8/10
Edge	8/10
Eurogamer	Recommended
Famitsu	9/10, 10/10, 9/10, 9/10
Game Informer	8.25/10
GameRevolution	3.5/5
GameSpot	8/10
GamesRadar+	3.5/5
Hardcore Gamer	4/5
IGN	7.8/10
Jeuxvideo.com	16/20
Nintendo Life	8/10
Nintendo World Report	8.5/10
Shacknews	6/10
USgamer	4/5
VentureBeat	65/100

Yoshi's Crafted World received "generally favorable" reviews from critics, according to the review aggregation website Metacritic. Fellow review aggregator OpenCritic assessed that the game received strong approval, being recommended by 81% of critics. In Japan, four critics from Famitsu gave the game a total score of 37 out of 40, with one critic awarding the game a perfect 10. Critics lauded the charm of the game with its level design and graphics, as well as its innovative gameplay formula, though the soundtrack and lack of difficulty were criticized.

=== Sales ===
Yoshi's Crafted World debuted at the top of the UK all-format and individual-format sales charts; the first Yoshi game to do so. The game also debuted first in Japan, launching with 53,327 physical sales; the best launch in the series since 2014's Yoshi's New Island. As of July 2019, it has sold over 150,000 copies in Japan. As of March 31, 2019, the game has sold 1.11 million copies worldwide. The 2023 CESA Games White Papers revealed that Yoshi's Crafted World had sold 3.35 million units, as of December 2022.

=== Awards ===
Year	Award	Category	Result	Ref.
2019	2019 Golden Joystick Awards	Nintendo Game of the Year	Nominated	
2019	The Game Awards 2019	Best Family Game	Nominated	
2020	23rd Annual D.I.C.E. Awards	Family Game of the Year	Nominated	
2020	NAVGTR Awards	Art Direction, Contemporary	Nominated	
2020	NAVGTR Awards	Control Precision	Nominated	
