= Yoshi's Island DS =

2006 video game

- North American box art
- Developer: Artoon
- Publisher: Nintendo
- Director: Hidetoshi Takeshita
- Producer: Toyokazu Nonaka
- Artist: Yasuhisa Nakagawa
- Writer: Soshi Kawasaki
- Composers: Yutaka Minobe; Masayoshi Ishi
- Series: Yoshi
- Platform: Nintendo DS
- Release: NA: November 13, 2006; AU: November 17, 2006; EU: December 1, 2006; JP: March 8, 2007
- Genre: Platform
- Mode: Single-player

Yoshi's Island DS, known in Japan as Yoshi Island DS, (Note: Japanese: ヨッシー アイランド DS, Hepburn: Yosshī Airando Dī Esu) is a 2006 platform game developed by Artoon and published by Nintendo for the Nintendo DS. It was released in North America and Australia in November 2006, in Europe in December 2006, and in Japan in March 2007. It is a sequel to the 1995 SNES game Super Mario World 2: Yoshi's Island. It was announced at Nintendo's E3 press conference in May 2006, and was originally to be titled Yoshi's Island 2, though its name was changed one month before its North American release. In April and May 2015, the game was made available for the Wii U via the Virtual Console service, shortly after a Nintendo Direct presentation.

The game's story focuses on the Yoshi clan as they attempt to rescue newborn children who have been kidnapped by Kamek. Yoshi's Island DS uses the same updated graphical style as Yoshi Touch & Go (2005), but retains the same core gameplay as its Super Nintendo Entertainment System predecessor; whereas the SNES game featured only Baby Mario and Baby Luigi, DS introduces Baby Peach, Baby Donkey Kong, and Baby Wario, while also allowing the player to control Baby Bowser. Each baby bestows a different ability upon Yoshi. The objective of the game is to use these abilities to progress through various themed worlds. The game was well received by critics, who praised its presentation, gameplay, and faithfulness to the original game while simultaneously introducing various new elements; while it received some minor criticism for perceived lingering similarities with the original game and the screen gap between both screens causing a blind spot for enemy attacks. Yoshi's Island DS was succeeded by Yoshi's New Island, a 2014 title for the Nintendo 3DS.

== Gameplay ==
A screenshot showing Yoshi's Island DS's distinctive graphical style. The Nintendo DS's two screens function as one tall screen.

Yoshi's Island DS's gameplay is the same as the previous game, with some additions. Just like in Super Mario World 2: Yoshi's Island the player guides various colored Yoshis through side scrolling stages. Yoshi can jump and hover (flutter jump) for a short time, eat enemies and turn them into eggs (which can be used for things like hitting switches and defeating distant enemies) and pound the ground (to smash crates, for example). Some stages offer Yoshi the ability to morph into vehicles for a short time. Like the original Yoshi's Island, the DS game differs from many platforming series in that Yoshi does not have a life bar; when Yoshi is hit, the baby he is carrying falls off his back and Yoshi must retrieve him or her before a timer expires (unless Yoshi falls on something that torments him instantly, such as a lava pit or a spike field).

What makes Yoshi's Island DS different is the addition of five babies for Yoshi to carry, each bestowing a different ability—Baby Mario allows Yoshi to dash and makes special "M" blocks appear, and can grab Super Stars to become Super Baby Mario, and grants ricocheting eggs; Baby Peach allows Yoshi to float and fly on wind currents and grants a more forgiving timing to use Yoshi's flutter jumping abilities effectively; Baby Donkey Kong can grab and swing on vines and ropes, grants a special dash attack, allows Yoshi's eggs to explode as per Yoshi’s Story (but they do so on impact) and allows Yoshi to push objects faster; Baby Wario uses his magnet to attract metal objects and allows Yoshi's eggs to bounce; and Baby Bowser spits fireballs, but the Yoshi carrying him cannot make eggs, though the eggs Yoshi already carries can bounce. The last three babies slow down Yoshi's movement and make the timing for his flutter jumping less forgiving. The need to switch babies at key points adds a puzzle element to the game.

The Nintendo DS's two screens act as one tall screen; however, in practice, this essentially just gives the player a better view of the surroundings and, save for one boss battle, (Hector the Reflector, where the bottom screen acts as a mirror through which to see Hector during the battle) only provides the benefit of being able to see more (above) and, when the player is on the top screen, below. The game does not make use of the bottom screen's touch sensitivity for basic gameplay, though it is an option for selecting levels and in some mini-games. Each of DS's five worlds has two bosses, each with a weakness that must be identified and exploited. Most of the time, these are simply giant-sized versions of normal enemies, though some are more inventive.

Flowers and coins, as well as stars, are scattered around the game's stages. These are totaled at the end of each stage and a score is given depending how many of each were collected (a maximum of 30 stars, 20 red coins, and 5 flowers). Sufficiently high scores are required to unlock one of the two sets of secret levels (the other set being unlocked upon completing the game, similar to the GBA remake of the original game). Special character coins are also introduced. Missing from the game are the power-ups of sorts—like the ability to spit seeds by eating watermelons—which were present in the original. The fire breathing ability is retained though: Yoshi can use it when he snags a torch or fireball with his tongue. This allows him to shoot streams of fire up to three times. Keys found in the stages unlock mini-games and doors that would be closed otherwise.

== Plot ==
As in Super Mario World 2: Yoshi's Island (1995), Baby Mario and the Yoshi clan must rescue Baby Luigi, who was snatched by Bowser's minion, Kamek, who also wants to kidnap every baby around the world. However, this time the Yoshis have the combined assistance of both Baby Peach and Baby Donkey Kong, as well as the stork, who escaped Kamek's botched capture. They later join with Baby Wario and Baby Bowser, who offer their specialized abilities so that the group may proceed. However, Baby Wario's lust for treasure leads him to abandon the group, while Baby Bowser is captured by Kamek (who is actually the future Kamek that appears throughout the forts and castles), and later kicked out by the Adult Bowser, who came from the future, because of his baby counterpart insulting him. Baby Bowser then joins the group until he notices Kamek is after him, leaving Yoshi and the other babies to continue their journey.

Much later in the game, Kamek's sinister plan for kidnapping the babies around the world is revealed. He and Bowser traveled back in time in search of the "star children" – seven babies whose hearts possess unimaginable power necessary for him to conquer the universe. Despite kidnapping all of the babies, they could not find a single star child. Yoshi's group later arrives at Bowser's castle and find Baby Wario and Baby Bowser, arguing over the treasure from Bowser's castle. They later join the group and as they arrive at the final room, Baby Bowser betrays them, claiming that Yoshi and the other babies wanted Bowser's treasure in his castle. Yoshi easily defeats him and Kamek arrives, along with Bowser, angered at what Yoshi did to his infant self.

Despite this, the babies and Yoshis prevail in both defeating Bowser, and forcing Kamek and Bowser to retreat to their present time. Yoshi and the babies then retrieve Baby Luigi and the other babies. Bowser's castle then self-destructs, but Yoshi and the other babies (with the help of the other storks carrying all of the babies) escape unharmed. The storks continue to bring all the babies back to their respective homes.

In a post-credits scene, six of the star children are revealed to be Baby Mario, Baby Luigi, Baby Peach, Baby Donkey Kong, Baby Wario, and Baby Bowser. Immediately thereafter, the seventh and final star child is revealed to be a newly-hatched Baby Yoshi, who is also strongly implied to be the very same Yoshi that the adult Mario Bros. would go on to rescue and ally with in Super Mario World and subsequent Mario games.

== Development ==
Yoshi's Island DS was announced at E3 2006 under the name Yoshi's Island 2, originally featuring only baby versions of Mario, Peach, Donkey Kong and Wario. The developer, Artoon, founded by Sonic the Hedgehog co-creator Naoto Ohshima, has made one other Yoshi game—Yoshi's Universal Gravitation—for the Game Boy Advance. Universal Gravitation veered away from the "Nintendo" design; but for DS, Artoon stuck close to the original concept.

The game retains the classic pastel/crayon visuals from its predecessor. Small changes are noticeable: water animation has been improved, the black outlines around objects are not as thick, and the backgrounds are less cluttered. However, the visuals are still tightly centered on those of its predecessor.

== Reception ==
Reception

Aggregate scores
Aggregator	Score
GameRankings	81.15%
Metacritic	81/100

Review scores
Publication	Score
Eurogamer	7/10
Game Informer	8.25/10
GamePro	4.25/5
GameSpot	9.1/10
GameSpy	4/5
IGN	8/10
Nintendo Life	7/10
Nintendo World Report	8.5/10
Official Nintendo Magazine	87/100

Yoshi's Island DS received "generally favorable" reviews from critics, according to the review aggregation website Metacritic. GameSpot's review commented that the developers have "produced a sequel that seems fresh and new while remaining every bit as awesome as the original". Multimedia website IGN called it "a solid recreation of the Yoshi's Island elements in a two-screen-high format", and GamePro in their review said that "it's fun and light-hearted play". Reviewers were particularly pleased with how the core gameplay elements are the same as in the previous game. GamePro hailed it as having "the classical 2D side-scrolling action and colorful pastel artwork that brought Nintendo to prominence", while IGN, although impressed with the game in general—wondered whether or not the developers "stuck too close to the established design in this new game", because they considered having played the previous game "ruins a lot of the surprises".

On the whole, reviewers were pleased with the way the extra babies have been implemented, but IGN felt that Baby Wario was "a last-minute addition that wasn't tested properly". They called his magnet "wonky", and said it "misses items that are right next to him". One problem critics identified is the blind spot created by the gap between the Nintendo DS's two screens. IGN accepts that this blind spot is necessary for aiming eggs properly but still describe it as "bothersome". GameSpy's reviewer called it "a pain" and expressed frustration at being hit by an enemy hiding in this gap.

The game's very high difficulty level in later worlds and for 100% completion was noted by some reviewers, who considered it manageable to clear but challenging to fully complete. GameSpot said that the game "isn't challenging in the traditional sense", but "for the completist [sic], [it] can become very challenging", due to requiring that the player collect every character coin, red coin, and flower in one run through each stage, while holding 30 stars by the end. Nintendo Life called the game a "pretty sizeable challenge by the end". Nintendo World Report felt that the game's challenge "ramped up" across the five worlds, and stated that while it is always "harder than the original Yoshi’s Island", 100% completion "is even harder than The Lost Levels", another platform game widely considered to be extremely difficult.

Yoshi's Island DS was given GameSpot's "Editor's Choice" rating, and reached the final round for "Best Nintendo DS game". The game sold more than 300,000 copies in its first week of release in Japan. As of March 31, 2008, Yoshi's Island DS has sold 2.91 million copies worldwide.

In 2023, Destructoid's CJ Andriessen placed Yoshi's Island DS second in his list of the 10 best Yoshi games, only behind the original game, deeming it "a fine return to form for Yoshi after so many years of experiments and disappointments, as well as a fine reminder of why anyone cared about this sub-series in the first place".

== See also ==
- List of Nintendo DS games
- 2006 in video games
