= Yoshi's New Island =

2014 video game

- Box art featuring Yoshi and Baby Mario
- Developer: Arzest
- Publisher: Nintendo
- Director: Masahide Kobayashi
- Producers: Naoto Ohshima; Takashi Tezuka
- Programmer: Yuki Hatakeyama
- Artist: Masamichi Harada
- Composers: Kazumi Totaka; Masayoshi Ishi
- Series: Yoshi
- Platform: Nintendo 3DS
- Release: EU/NA: March 14, 2014; AU: March 15, 2014; JP: July 24, 2014
- Genre: Platform
- Modes: Single-player, multiplayer

Yoshi's New Island (Note: Japanese: ヨッシー New アイランド, Hepburn: Yosshī Nyū Airando) is a 2014 platform game developed by Arzest and published by Nintendo for the Nintendo 3DS. The third installment in the Yoshi's Island series, it is set between the events of Yoshi's Island (1995) and Yoshi's Island DS (2006). The game was released in Europe, North America, and Australia in March 2014 and in Japan in July 2014.

Like its predecessors, Yoshi's New Island's gameplay revolves around safely transporting the infant Mario to his brother Luigi by completing a series of levels across an island. The player characters are dinosaurs known as the Yoshi species; each dinosaur is named Yoshi and has a unique color. In addition to returning mechanics such as hovering, as well as laying and throwing eggs, Yoshis are occasionally able to create massive eggs known as Eggdozers, which can be used to clear paths.

The development team chose to create a sequel to Yoshi's Island due to its simplicity in gameplay and construction. The game shared some level design staff with Yoshi's Woolly World, which was developed concurrently at Good-Feel. Yoshi's New Island features a hand-drawn art style where level designs and backgrounds are stylized as oil paintings, watercolors, and crayon drawings.

Yoshi's New Island received mixed reviews from critics, who praised its sense of charm and nostalgia, but were divided on its art style, level design, and difficulty. Criticism was directed toward its soundtrack – which some considered repetitive – as well as the game's perceived lack of originality in comparison to its predecessors. The game was reissued as part of the Nintendo Selects line in 2016, and by 2020 it had sold more than two million copies worldwide. Yoshi's New Island was followed by Yoshi's Woolly World for the Wii U in 2015.

== Gameplay ==
The player character, Yoshi, in the first level of the game, aiming a Mega Eggdozer at a pipe structure. The more destruction caused by the Eggdozer, the more the bar at the top is filled.

Yoshi's New Island is a platform game similar to previous Yoshi's Island games. The player characters are different-colored dinosaurs known as Yoshis, who must protect an infant named Mario from enemies and overcome obstacles to reach the goal at the end of every level. The game features six areas on the island known as worlds, which span different climates including forests, snowy plains, and volcanic fields. Each world comprises eight mandatory levels and two optional ones, for a total of sixty levels. The fourth level of every world is set in a castle that ends with a battle against the wizard Kamek, while the eighth level concludes with a battle against a boss, an enemy enhanced and enlarged by Kamek's magic; each boss is defeated in three hits.

Yoshi's returning abilities include hovering in midair briefly (known as "flutter jumping"), swallowing and spitting out enemies, and throwing eggs to attack foes and solve puzzles. Upon taking damage, Yoshi has 10–30 seconds to retrieve Baby Mario from a moving bubble before the infant is taken away by Kamek's underlings, which results in the loss of a life. Certain obstacles – such as spikes, bottomless pits, and poisonous water – cause Yoshi to lose a life instantly. Losing several lives in a row while attempting to complete a level unlocks the Flutter Wings, a power-up that enables indefinite hovering. Losing a life with the Flutter Wings unlocks its golden variant, which provides both flight and invincibility. If all lives are lost, the player receives a game over and must start from the beginning of the level with five lives.

Each level contains several collectible items: up to five flowers, twenty red coins, and thirty stars. The lattermost collectible increments the amount of time Yoshi has to rescue Baby Mario upon taking damage. To unlock one of the two optional levels in each world, the player must obtain all of the collectibles and finish every level in the respective world with full health. The other optional level is unlocked after 30 medals are collected by jumping through the roulette ring at the end of each level. This ring functions as the goal of most levels and replaces post-level minigames from the previous Yoshi's Island installments. For each flower collected in a level, one is added to the ring; if the ring's meter lands on a flower, the player receives medals, which can also earn extra lives.

Certain levels feature a section in which Yoshi transforms into one of six objects: a bobsled, a helicopter, a hot air balloon, a jackhammer, a minecart, or a submarine. All of Yoshi's transformations are controlled with the console's gyroscope. Other sections use the Yoshi Star power-up, which briefly transforms Yoshi into Super Yoshi. In this form, Yoshi has invincibility, can travel at high speeds, and is able to run up walls as well as across ceilings for a short period of time.

By eating giant Shy Guy enemies or hitting certain blocks, Yoshi can obtain Mega Eggdozers, a feature introduced in Yoshi's New Island. They are massive eggs that can be thrown to destroy normally indestructible terrain and obstacles in the way, providing access to previously obstructed areas as well as potentially earning the player extra lives. A metal variant of the Mega Eggdozer clears paths in addition to weighing Yoshi down, diminishing jumps but allowing for exploration of underwater areas.

In addition to the single-player story mode, there are six cooperative two-player minigames centered around Yoshi's platforming skillset; for instance, one minigame tasks the player with using eggs to pop as many balloons as possible within a time limit, while another challenges the player to use Yoshi's hovering ability to travel as far as possible while collecting coins. A new minigame is unlocked every time a world is cleared. Yoshi's New Island supports local multiplayer via Download Play.

== Plot ==
Yoshi's New Island is a direct sequel to Yoshi's Island (1995), taking place immediately after the original game. A stork delivers twin brothers Baby Mario and Baby Luigi to a couple in the Mushroom Kingdom incorrectly believed to be their parents. Upon realizing its mistake, the stork reclaims the babies and sets off to locate their real parents, but is ambushed by the wizard Kamek, who captures the stork and Baby Luigi. Baby Mario falls on Egg Island, a floating island that was taken over by Baby Bowser, and reunites with the Yoshi clan, who transported Baby Mario to his brother in the original game. It is discovered that Baby Mario can telepathically sense Baby Luigi's location, and the Yoshis agree to help Baby Mario rescue his brother by taking turns escorting him across the island.

Yoshi and Baby Mario travel to Baby Bowser's castle, where Kamek attempts to stop them. Baby Bowser is awakened and attempts to ride Yoshi, but is defeated. Kamek uses his magic to enlarge Baby Bowser, who reverts to his original size after being defeated again. Yoshi then rescues the stork and Baby Luigi, and the infants are returned home. At this point, if the player has used the Flutter Wings or the Golden Flutter Wings to finish a level, the adult Bowser abruptly appears and challenges the player to complete every level without the power-ups in order to face him in battle.

If the player completes every level without these power-ups, after Baby Bowser is defeated, the adult Bowser suddenly appears after warping through spacetime to avenge his younger self. After the adult Bowser is defeated, Kamek uses his magic to make Bowser huge. Once Bowser is defeated a second time, Yoshi reunites with the stork and Baby Luigi, and the brothers are brought back to their true home and parents.

== Development and release ==
The third entry in the Yoshi's Island series, Yoshi's New Island had its development outsourced from Nintendo to Arzest, where some members had been involved in the development of the original Yoshi's Island and Yoshi's Island DS (2006). Masahide Kobayashi directed, founder Naoto Ohshima produced, Masamichi Harada was the art director, and Masayoshi Ishi composed the soundtrack with contributions from sound designer Kazumi Totaka. Arzest was assisted by several Nintendo developers, including level designers who had worked on games in the New Super Mario Bros. series.

Nintendo producer Takashi Tezuka had previously directed both Super Mario World (1990) and the original Yoshi's Island. In an interview with Nintendo Life, Tezuka said they chose to develop a sequel to Yoshi's Island over a follow-up to Yoshi's Story (1997), due to the former's simplicity in gameplay and construction, as well as its art style being better suited for the Nintendo 3DS. Oil paintings, watercolors, and crayon drawings in graphics helped retain what Tezuka described as the "warm and friendly vibe" of the original Yoshi's Island, as well as the "handicraft feel" for which the series had become known.

Yoshi's New Island was developed alongside Yoshi's Woolly World, sharing some level design staff despite the latter title being developed by Good-Feel. The Eggdozer concept originated from the development team's interest in "creating something big and impactful". Levels were made easier than those in previous Yoshi's Island games, whereas collectibles were intended to provide a challenge for more experienced players.

During a Nintendo Direct presentation on April 17, 2013, Nintendo President Satoru Iwata announced that a new Yoshi's Island game would be released for the 3DS. The game's name, a trailer, and a demo were revealed in June 2013 at E3, a video game trade show. Nintendo announced the game's release date in January 2014. In early March of that year, Nintendo announced a special-edition Yoshi-themed Nintendo 3DS XL, to be released alongside the game in North America and Europe on March 14; the system had been leaked in early February. At a promotional event in California on March 9, three young actors – Benjamin Stockham of About a Boy, Garrett Clayton of Teen Beach Movie (2013), and Bella Thorne of Shake It Up – posed with the special-edition 3DS XL system and threw balloons containing green paint at a large egg.

Yoshi's New Island was published by Nintendo in 2014, and was released in North America and Europe on March 14, in Australia the following day, and in Japan on July 24. Following the game's release, a limited-edition T-shirt featuring the Mega Eggdozer was made purchasable exclusively for members of Club Nintendo, a customer loyalty program that supplied rewards to members in Japan and other countries. In 2015, Yoshi's New Island was succeeded by Yoshi's Woolly World for the Wii U.

== Reception ==
=== Critical response ===
Reception

Aggregate scores
Aggregator	Score
Metacritic	64/100
OpenCritic	15% recommend

Review scores
Publication	Score
Destructoid	7/10
Edge	4/10
Eurogamer	4/10
Famitsu	8/10, 9/10, 7/10, 8/10
Game Informer	7/10
GameSpot	5/10
GamesRadar+	3/5
IGN	7.9/10
Nintendo Life	5/10
Nintendo World Report	6/10

Yoshi's New Island received "mixed or average" reviews from critics, according to the review aggregation website Metacritic. Fellow review aggregator OpenCritic assessed that the game received fair approval, being recommended by 15% of critics. In Japan, Famitsu's reviewers praised the new Eggdozer mechanic. Although Kyle Orland of Ars Technica found this mechanic promising, he stated that it was "used exclusively in extremely contrived situations"; similarly, Chris Schilling of Eurogamer wrote that it was "used prescriptively and predictably", while Jose Otero of IGN felt that the level designs never fully committed to the idea.

Several critics praised the game's sense of charm, especially in its aesthetics. Additionally, Alex Culafi of Nintendo World Report and Kathryn Bailey of GamesRadar+ found nostalgia in the sound effects and level design. However, Edge magazine attributed this feeling to the storyline being nearly identical to that of the original Yoshi's Island, and Culafi wrote that "a successor can only lean so much on previous works before a game starts to feel a bit like a rehash".

Thomas Blichfeldt of Gamereactor stated that several of the game's elements were nearly identical to those of the original Yoshi's Island, writing: "After a while it feels more like you're playing some sort of expansion rather than a separate game." Tom Mc Shea of GameSpot added that "every element of this game panders to nostalgic memories rather than forging new paths", believing that whereas Yoshi's Island DS established an identity via its unique system of swapping babies with different abilities, Yoshi's New Island recycled most of its best elements from the original game, making it forgettable. Peter Willington of Pocket Gamer found Yoshi's New Island to be both "a great game" and "one of the most forgettable Mario-related adventures in a while", writing that although it was "a fun re-hash" of Yoshi's Island, it lacked the original game's creative spirit.

The game's art style proved controversial. Nintendo World Report's Alex Culafi wrote that the 3D visuals were among the best on the 3DS, GameSpot's Tom Mc Shea referred to the artistic design as enchanting, and Pocket Gamer's Peter Willington opined that the art style "never fails to look beautiful". Tsumori Deluxe of Famitsu said the gentle music and sound effects, combined with the painting-like graphics, gave the game a soothing atmosphere. Conversely, Giant Bomb's Patrick Klepek stated that the aesthetic style felt half-hearted, while Slant Magazine's Mike LeChevallier described the visuals as vapid and stiff. Similarly, Will Greenwald of PCMag panned the watercolor effect as generic, odd, and "jarringly artificial", with Kyle Orland of Ars Technica adding that the art style and animation appeared somewhat overdone and lifeless. Most of these reviewers agreed that the visual style lacked the flair or charm of the original Yoshi's Island, with IGN's Jose Otero and Eurogamer's Chris Schilling adding that the art style was inconsistent.

Critics were divided on the game's level design. IGN's Jose Otera, Ars Technica's Kyle Orland, and Giant Bomb's Patrick Klepek praised this aspect, particularly enjoying the variety and placement of collectibles; Klepek stated that "[w]hat [Yoshi's New Island] does nail is the satisfaction of exploration". However, Nintendo Life's Dave Letcavage wrote that the level design "overall evokes little wonder and is often average at best", Eurogamer's Chris Schilling stated that it had "sedative qualities", and Kathryn Bailey of GamesRadar+ criticized some of the levels for their perceived linearity, simplicity, and repetitiveness. All three critics felt that the platforming was rarely difficult. Furthermore, Edge described the levels as bland and characterless, The Observer's Chris Dring deemed the level design sloppy, and Gamereactor's Thomas Blichfeldt derided the level design as "the worst the franchise has ever seen".

Several reviewers criticized the soundtrack, describing the music as clunky, lackluster, and "bewilderingly poor". Angela Marrujo Fornaca of Nintendojo and both of Nintendo World Report's reviewers noted that many songs were variations of the same theme, while Ars Technica's Kyle Orland criticized the use of kazoos in several songs. Multiple reviewers also criticized the game for a perceived lack of difficulty in its boss fights, pointing out that most battles relied on simply striking the boss three times. Nintendo World Report's Alex Culafi considered these encounters to be one of the game's biggest weaknesses, while Nintendo Life's Dave Letcavage summarized the fights as "shallow, simple, and uninspired, often ending before they really begin". Two reviewers in Famitsu said the game was not overtly challenging and was appropriately balanced for difficulty, with one reviewer, Kiichi Totsuka, stating that the difficulty was a welcome challenge to veteran players.

The use of motion controls in the transformation sections also received criticism, being referred to as imprecise, clunky, and awkward; Polygon's Danielle Riendeau and Nintendo World Report's Dan Koopman singled out the submarine segments as being tedious. A handful of critics also complained of a brief delay with throwing eggs, particularly while stationary.

Destructoid listed Yoshi's New Island eighth in its ranking of the "10 best Yoshi Games of all time", stating that the game offered "some genuinely fun new levels, particularly near the end", though ultimately "played it too safe for its own good". Yoshi's New Island was the lowest-ranking Yoshi's Island game on the list. Yoshi's New Island was inducted into Famitsu's Gold Hall of Fame in the magazine's July 31, 2014, issue.

=== Sales ===
Yoshi's New Island debuted at #2 on the Japanese software sales charts behind Yo-kai Watch 2, selling more than 58,000 copies. In the UK, it debuted at #12 on the all-format chart and #10 on the single-format chart. By October 22, 2014, the game had sold more than 197,000 copies in Japan. As of December 31, 2020, worldwide sales had reached 2.06 million copies, making Yoshi's New Island the 33rd-best-selling game for the Nintendo 3DS. The game was added to the Nintendo Selects label in Europe on October 16, 2015, and in North America on March 11, 2016.

== See also ==
- List of platformers
- List of video games featuring Mario
- 2014 in video games
