= Yoshi =

Video game character

- Mario character
- Promotional art by Shigehisa Nakaue (2019)
- First game: Super Mario World (1990)
- Designed by: Shigefumi Hino
- Voiced by: Kazumi Totaka (1997–present) Others: Andrew Sabiston (Super Mario World); Chika Sakamoto, Ikue Ōtani and Tamayo Hayashi (Super Mario World: Mario & Yoshi's Adventure Land; Japanese); Junko Hori (Yoshi's Cookie commercial; Japanese); Bruce Sandig (Mario Is Missing!); Frank Welker (Super Mario Bros.); Donald Glover (The Super Mario Galaxy Movie)

In-universe information
- Full name: T. Yoshisaur Munchakoopas
- Species: Yoshi

Yoshi (Note: Yosshī (Japanese: ヨッシー; pronounced [joɕɕiː]; English: /ˈjoʊʃi, ˈjɒʃi/). In Japan, the name is sometimes romanized in Nihon-shiki or Kunrei-shiki as Yossy.) is a fictional character who appears in video games published by Nintendo. He was designed by Shigefumi Hino and first appeared in Super Mario World (1990) for the Super Nintendo Entertainment System as a rideable companion for Mario and Luigi. The character belongs to a species of dinosaur-like creatures, also called Yoshis, which are commonly depicted in different colors and are known for using their long tongues to eat enemies and produce eggs.

Originally conceived after Shigeru Miyamoto expressed interest in giving Mario a dinosaur companion, Yoshi was introduced once the Super Nintendo hardware allowed the idea to be implemented. After his debut, he became the title character of the Yoshi series, beginning with games such as Yoshi and Super Mario World 2: Yoshi's Island. Across these games, Yoshi is often portrayed as a heroic and protective character, with abilities such as eating enemies, throwing eggs, and performing the Flutter Jump.

Yoshi is also a recurring supporting character in the wider Mario franchise. He has appeared in mainline Super Mario games, the Mario Kart and Mario Party series, various Mario sports titles, and every installment of the Super Smash Bros. series. Outside video games, Yoshi has appeared in animated series, comics, merchandise, theme park attractions, and film adaptations, including The Super Mario Bros. Movie (2023) and The Super Mario Galaxy Movie (2026), where he is voiced by Donald Glover.

Yoshi has been positively received by critics and audiences, who have often highlighted his design, abilities, popularity, and role as Mario's companion. He has been described as one of Nintendo's most recognizable characters and has appeared in several rankings of notable video game characters and sidekicks.

== Concept and creation ==
Considered after the development of Super Mario Bros., Yoshi's early design differs greatly from his finished appearance.

Shigeru Miyamoto, the video game designer at Nintendo credited with inventing the Mario series, had wanted Mario to have a dinosaur companion ever since the first release of Super Mario Bros.; however, Nintendo engineers could not add such a character into the game due to the limitations of the Nintendo Entertainment System (NES). The inspiration for Yoshi can be traced back further, to the green dragon Tamagon in the 1984 video game Devil World: also designed by Miyamoto, both are green lizards that hatch from eggs and can eat enemies with their large mouth, and also emit the same noise when they hatch. During the development of Super Mario Bros. 3, Miyamoto had a number of sketches around his desk, including an image of Mario riding a horse. Takashi Tezuka, a Mario series developer, speculated that Miyamoto's love of horse riding as well as country and western themes influenced Yoshi's creation. The concept of Mario riding a dinosaur also came from the NES video game Excitebike, which featured people riding motorcycles.

Once the more powerful Super NES was released, Miyamoto was finally able to implement Yoshi into the series, putting Yoshi into the video game Super Mario World. As development of Super Mario World progressed, the team opted to set the game in a "dinosaur land", so Tezuka asked designer Shigefumi Hino to draw a reptile-like creature based on Miyamoto's sketches. Hino originally produced a design that Tezuka deemed too reptilian, and "didn't really fit into the Mario world", so he encouraged the designer to create a "cuter" character. According to Hino, Yoshi's tongue attack was originally conceived as Yoshi sticking out his tongue in surprise when Mario hit the back of his head. This was later "passed off" as Mario merely pointing forward to signal Yoshi to stick out his tongue. Alongside the individual Yoshi, Super Mario World also introduced other members of the Yoshi species, characterized by their variety of colors.

Yoshi proved to be popular in this debut, which caused the next game in the series, Super Mario World 2: Yoshi's Island, to focus on the Yoshi species. At Miyamoto's prompting, Hino landed on the idea of using Yoshi as the main character of a platforming game, with the goal of being more accessible than previous games in the Mario series. To give the gameplay a more "gentle and relaxed pacing", the levels lack time limits and feature more exploration elements than previous games; Yoshi's flutter jump also makes him easier to control in the air than Mario. In this game, he is responsible for Baby Mario, which leads him to Bowser's Castle, where he is reunited with Baby Luigi. Yoshi successfully pulls the twins together just in time to go home after beating a huge Baby Bowser.

The version of Yoshi seen in the live-action Super Mario Bros. film was realized using a 0.91-metre-tall (3.0 ft) animatronic dinosaur. Yoshi was designed in the film by Dave Nelson. The animatronic had nearly 60 meters (200 ft) of cable and hundreds of moving parts inside of it and was controlled by nine puppeteers. The body was cable-controlled, while the head was radio-controlled. Nelson described the overall process as being "difficult." The creation of Yoshi was handled by a company independent from the filmmakers.

According to a 1993 Nintendo internal guide, Yoshi's full name is T. Yoshisaur Munchakoopas. However, no mainline games have referred to the character with this name.

== Appearances ==
=== Super Mario series ===
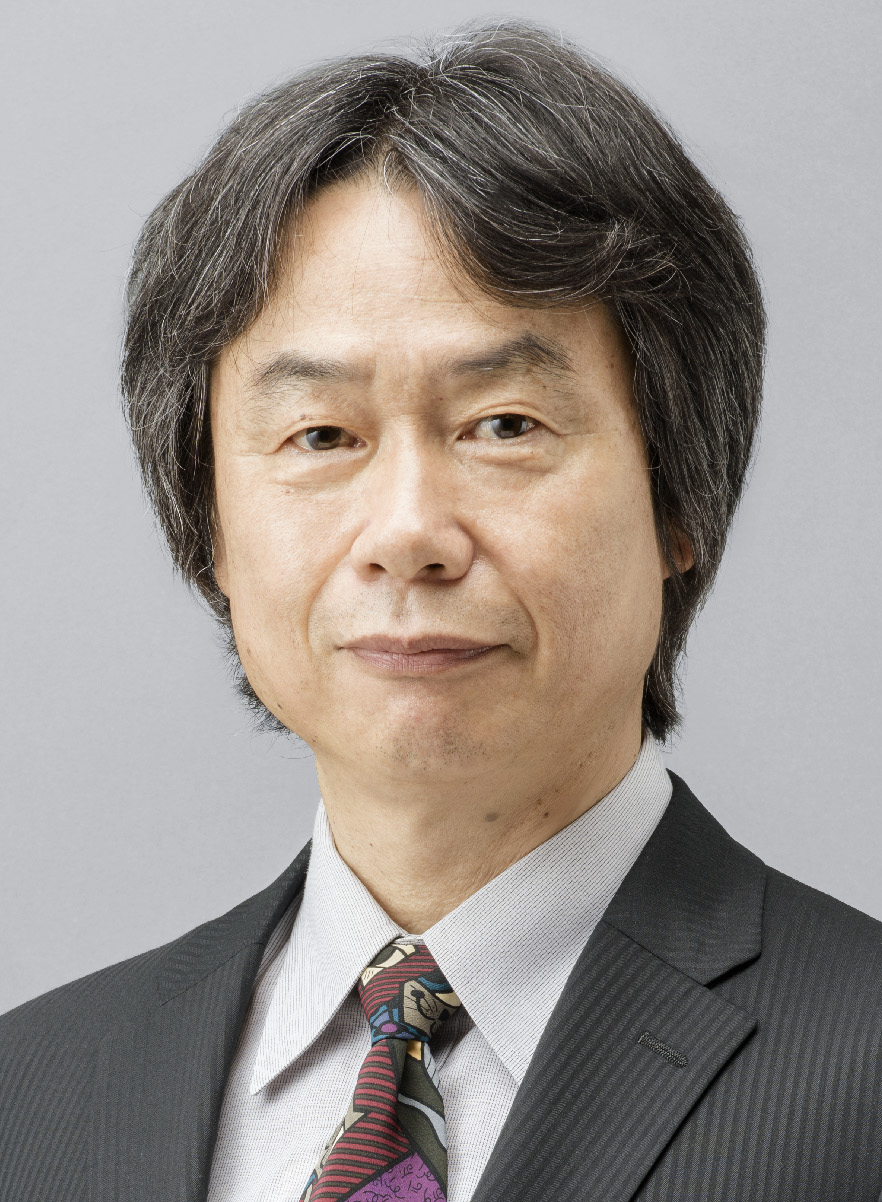
Super Mario World featured Yoshi's first appearance (left). The inspiration for Yoshi can be traced back even further; Miyamoto designed a green dragon for the 1984 game Devil World which shared many similarities with Yoshi.

Yoshi made his debut in Super Mario World in 1990, where he appeared as Mario’s rideable companion. He later made a small cameo in Super Mario 64. After Mario collects all 120 Power Stars, Yoshi can be found on the roof of Peach’s Castle and there, he delivers a message from the developers and rewards Mario with 100 extra lives and an enhanced Triple Jump. Yoshi also appears as one of the main protagonists and the first playable character in Super Mario 64 DS. Yoshi returns as a mount in several later Super Mario games, including Super Mario Sunshine, New Super Mario Bros. Wii, New Super Mario Bros. U, Super Mario Galaxy 2 and Super Mario Maker. In Super Mario Odyssey, he appears as a capturable character on top of Peach’s Castle, allowing the player to use his Flutter Jump and eating abilities. In Super Mario Bros. Wonder, Yoshi appears as a playable character, with red, yellow, and blue variants. These Yoshis can use the Flutter Jump and can also be ridden by other players.

=== Yoshi series ===
The Yoshi egg used to represent the character

Yoshi's initial appearance in the Yoshi series was in the puzzle game Yoshi, where he counted the number of eggs hatched on the side of the screen. In another puzzle game, Yoshi's Cookie, Yoshi appears as a character in V.S. mode. Yoshi also appears alongside Mario as a playable character in Yoshi's Safari, where they must defeat Bowser and save Jewelry Land. He is the protagonist of Super Mario World 2: Yoshi's Island, acting as the caretaker to Baby Mario. The next Yoshi game, Yoshi's Story, has the Yoshis world turned into a storybook, with six Yoshis as the protagonists. Yoshi also appears as the playable protagonist in Yoshi's Universal Gravitation, where his appearance remains consistent with his established design while the gameplay centers on tilting the environment around him. He also appears in Yoshi Touch & Go, where he guides Baby Mario through side-scrolling levels using touch-screen controls. In Yoshi's Island DS, Kamek and Bowser travel back in time and kidnap all of the Mushroom Kingdom's youngsters, only to have some escape and join Yoshi in a journey to save the other kids. Yoshi reappears alongside the baby Mario brothers in Yoshi's New Island, a prequel to Yoshi's Island DS. Yoshi’s next two major games present the character in a handmade craft style. In Yoshi's Woolly World, Yoshi and Red Yoshi must save Craft Island from Kamek and Baby Bowser. The sequel, Yoshi's Crafted World, has the Yoshis collecting the broken pieces of the Sundream Stone. Yoshi is also the protagonist of the game Yoshi and the Mysterious Book, released in May 2026, in which Yoshi finds a magical book containing information about unusual creatures so he decides to jump in and investigate.

=== Other Mario games ===
Yoshi has appeared in almost all of the Mario spin-off games. He is a playable character in every Mario Kart and Mario Party game released so far, and has also appeared in several Mario sports titles, including Mario Tennis, Mario Golf, Mario Super Sluggers, Super Mario Strikers, and Mario & Sonic at the Olympic Games. In 1993, Yoshi appeared as a supporting character in Mario is Missing for the NES, SNES, and MS-DOS. The Yoshi species made its debut in the Paper Mario series during the fifth chapter of Paper Mario, when Mario discovers a village of Yoshis. In Paper Mario: The Thousand-Year Door, Mario rescues a Yoshi egg that later hatches into a baby Yoshi. This baby Yoshi joins Mario’s party during the game’s third chapter and can be named by the player. Yoshi also appears in Mario & Luigi: Partners in Time. Yoshi is also playable in Mario + Rabbids Kingdom Battle, where he is unlocked after defeating Mecha Jr. in the Lava Pit.

=== Other video games ===
Yoshi makes a cameo appearance in Metal Gear (The Twin Snakes and Metal Gear Solid: Snake Eater 3D). In Metal Gear Solid: The Twin Snakes, Yoshi and Mario appear as dolls that stand on a desk. Additional video game series in which Yoshi has made a cameo appearance includes The Legend of Zelda series (Link's Awakening and Ocarina of Time) as a collectible doll and as a framed photo in Hyrule Castle. He is the main character in the English localization of Tetris Attack. Yoshi also appears as a playable character in every installment of the Super Smash Bros. series. Yoshi's moveset mostly consists of kicks, headbutts, tail attacks, and tongue grabs.

=== Other media ===
The animated series Super Mario World features Yoshi as a regular character, voiced by Andrew Sabiston. Yoshi is featured in the Super Mario Adventures comic serial printed in Nintendo Power, the Nintendo Adventure Books, and also appears in the 1993 Super Mario Bros. film, taking the form of a realistic animatronic dinosaur as a King Koopa's pet that later joins Princess Daisy's side. Yoshi appears in the first volume of Super Mario-Kun and has since become a frequent companion to Mario, Additionally, Yoshi makes an off-screen vocal cameo in The Super Mario Bros Movie during the post-credits scene, with archival audio of Kazumi Totaka being utilized. He appears in the 2026 sequel, The Super Mario Galaxy Movie, where he is voiced by Donald Glover.

Yoshi is featured prominently within the Super Nintendo World themed areas at Universal Parks, appearing in the Mario Kart: Bowser's Challenge attraction, and Yoshi's Adventure, an omnimover attraction themed to the Yoshi's Island series.

== Merchandise ==
Yoshi is one of the most recognizable characters in the Mario series and is featured in a myriad of Mario merchandise, such as toys, shirts, and figures. Yoshi also appeared in two of Happy Meal promotions of Mario toys, which only featured Mario, Donkey Kong, and Yoshi. As part of the release of Yoshi's Woolly World, Yoshi Amiibo made out of yarn are either bundled with the game or sold separately. In addition to the regular-sized green, pink and light blue yarn Yoshi Amiibo, an 8-inch tall, green "Mega Yarn Yoshi" has been released. Chris Carter of Destructoid described Yoshi, along with Poochy, as "cute as hell" in the "Poochy & Yoshi's Woolly World" promotion.

== Reception ==
=== Critical reception ===
Since debuting in Super Mario World, Yoshi has received largely positive reception. An article in Electronic Gaming Monthly commented, "Maybe it was the undeniable dino charm. Maybe it was the insatiable appetite that put fellow foe-eater Kirby to shame. Or maybe it was the status of being Mario's newest best buddy. Whatever the reason, gamers took an immediate liking to Yoshi and his multicolored kin when Super Mario World hatched him into the pantheon of classic game characters." Australia's Official Nintendo Magazine called Yoshi a "cute, trustworthy, a plumber's best friend" and compared Yoshi's loyalty to that of a dog.

=== Legacy ===
Yoshi was also praised for being the best video game sidekick. GameSpy ranked Yoshi as the seventh-best video game sidekick, above Luigi by reasoning that only Yoshi can pull off being green and still be cool. In a poll conducted in 2008, Yoshi was voted as the third-favorite video game character in Japan, with Cloud Strife and Mario placing second and first, respectively. The 2011 issue of the Guinness World Records Gamer's Edition ranked Yoshi at 21st place in their list of the "Top 50 Video Game Characters of All Time", making him the second highest-ranked Mario character on the list, of which Mario himself is ranked first. Complex ranked Yoshi at fourth place among "The 25 Most Kickass Dragons in Video Games", adding "Yoshi would have to be one of the best sidekicks of all time". Yoshi has been named one of the best-supporting characters in video games by Kevin Wong of Complex, stating that "Yoshi has everything Mario and Luigi need in a sidekick – a monstrous appetite, boots that can walk on Munchers, and the ability to breathe fire, fly, and cause earthquakes, depending on the Koopa shell's color. You have to love a sidekick that hatches with a built-in saddle." Yoshi was included in IGN's "The Best Video Game Wingmen Ever", stating that "Always ready to give his plumber friend a ride, Yoshi doesn't shy away from putting in extra effort, whether that means holding a Koopa shell in his mouth for an entire level or kicking his feet to get a little extra air during a jump, Yoshi has Mario's back." Yoshi was voted one of the finest dinosaurs of pop culture by Jim Vorel of Paste, who stated that "Yoshi has been a fan favorite since he first appeared alongside Mario on the Super Nintendo Entertainment System. That's why he's the most famous dinosaur in the world." Yoshi is ranked at 52nd place on GamesRadar's Top 100 video game heroes. Alyssa Mercante of GamesRadar also included Yoshi in their list of "The ten best video game animal companions," stating that "Yoshi is another companion that has achieved a level of fame virtually unrivaled by video game sidekicks."

"Yoshi Committed Tax Fraud", an internet meme that began in May 2018, is a reference to jokes about Yoshi dodging taxes.
