= Yoshi's Island =

1995 video game

Super Mario World 2: Yoshi's Island
- North American cover art
- Developers: Nintendo EAD; Nintendo R&D2 (GBA)
- Publisher: Nintendo
- Directors: Takashi Tezuka; Toshihiko Nakago; Shigefumi Hino; Hideki Konno
- Producer: Shigeru Miyamoto
- Designer: Yasuhisa Yamamura
- Programmer: Toshio Iwawaki
- Artists: Yoshiaki Koizumi; Hisashi Nogami
- Composer: Koji Kondo
- Series: Super Mario; Yoshi
- Platforms: Super NES, Game Boy Advance
- Release: August 5, 1995: Super NES; JP: August 5, 1995; NA: October 4, 1995; EU: October 5, 1995; AU: December 1995 Game Boy Advance; JP: September 20, 2002; NA: September 23, 2002; AU: October 4, 2002; EU: October 11, 2002
- Genre: Platform
- Modes: Single-player, multiplayer

Super Mario World 2: Yoshi's Island (Note: Known in Japan as Super Mario: Yoshi Island (Japanese: スーパーマリオ ヨッシーアイランド, Hepburn: Sūpā Mario: Yosshī Airando)) is a 1995 platform game developed and published by Nintendo for the Super Nintendo Entertainment System (SNES). The player controls Yoshi dinosaurs on their quest to reunite baby Mario with his brother Luigi, who has been kidnapped by the wizard Kamek. Yoshi runs and jumps to reach the end of each level while solving puzzles and collecting items with Mario's help.

Having introduced the character in the previous Super Mario game, Super Mario World (1990), Nintendo decided to develop a game starring Yoshi, with the aim of making it more accessible. Yoshi's Island introduced his signature flutter jump and egg-spawning abilities. The marker-drawn art style was created by scanning hand-drawn pictures and approximating them pixel-by-pixel. Some special effects were powered by a new Super FX2 microchip.

After four years of development, Yoshi's Island was released in Japan in August 1995 and worldwide two months later. It sold more than four million copies. Critics described it as one of the greatest video games of all time, praising the art, sound, level design and gameplay. The art style and Yoshi's signature characteristics established the Yoshi series of spin-offs and sequels.

Yoshi's Island was the last Super Mario platformer before the series' transition to 3D gameplay, with no further 2D entries for over a decade. It was ported to the Game Boy Advance as Yoshi's Island: Super Mario Advance 3 in 2002; this version was rereleased for the Nintendo 3DS and the Wii U's Virtual Console. The original version was also released for the Super NES Classic Edition, and both versions for the Nintendo Classics service.

== Plot ==
Kamek attacks a stork delivering baby brothers Mario and Luigi. He succeeds in kidnapping Luigi, but Mario falls out of the sky and onto the back of Yoshi, the friendly dinosaur, on Yoshi's Island. Yoshi and his friends relay Mario across the island to reach Luigi and rescue him from Kamek, who is in the service of the young Bowser. Bowser wanted to abduct the brothers when Kamek foresaw that they would foil his plans in the future. Yoshi defeats Bowser, saves Luigi, and the stork successfully delivers the brothers to their parents in the Mushroom Kingdom.

== Gameplay ==
Yoshi aims an egg at a Piranha Plant. The timer in the top right corner will count down if Mario falls off his back. The game has a hand-drawn, paper-and-crayon aesthetic.

Yoshi's Island is a 2D side-scrolling platform game. In the Super Mario series platform game tradition, the player controls Yoshi in run-and-jump gameplay. The player navigates between platforms and atop some foes en route to the end of the increasingly difficult levels. The player characters are Yoshis who take turns traveling through 48 levels across six worlds to rescue Baby Luigi and reunite the brothers. Yoshi also collects coins to earn extra lives and retains his long tongue from Super Mario World. The game centers more on "puzzle-solving and item-collecting" than other platformers, with hidden flowers and red coins to find. Levels include mines, ski jumps, and "the requisite fiery dungeons". Every fourth level (two in each world) is a boss fight against a large version of a previous foe.

In a style new to the series, the game has a coloring book aesthetic with "scribbled crayon" backgrounds. Expanding on his "trademark tongue" ability to swallow enemies, Yoshi, as the focus of the game, is given a new move set: the ability to "flutter jump", throw eggs, and transform. The flutter jump gives Yoshi a secondary boost when the player holds the jump button. It became his new "trademark move", similar to that of Luigi in Super Mario Bros. 2. Yoshi can also pound the ground from mid-air to bury objects or break through soft earth, and use his long tongue to grab enemies at a distance. Swallowed enemies can be spat as projectiles immediately or stored for later use as an egg. The player individually aims and fires the eggs at obstacles via a new targeting system. The eggs also bounce off of surfaces in the environment. Up to six eggs can be stored this way, and will trail behind the character. Yoshi can also eat certain items for power-up abilities. For instance, watermelons let Yoshi shoot seeds from his mouth like a machine gun, and fire enemies turn his mouth into a flamethrower. Other power-ups transform Yoshi into vehicles including cars, drills, helicopters, and submarines. A star power-up makes Baby Mario invulnerable and extra fast.

While Yoshi is "virtually invincible", if hit by an enemy, Baby Mario will float off his back in a bubble while a timer counts down to zero. When the timer expires, Koopas arrive to take Baby Mario and Yoshi loses a life. The player can replenish the timer by collecting small stars and power-ups. However, Yoshi can also lose a life instantly if he comes into contact with obstacles such as pits, spikes, lava, and thorns. Similar to Super Mario World, the player can hold a power-up in reserve, such as a "+10 star" (which adds ten seconds to the Baby Mario timer) or a "magnifying glass" (which reveals all hidden red coins in a level). These power-ups are acquired in several minigames. At the end of each level, the Yoshi relays Baby Mario to the successive Yoshi. If the player perfects all eight levels in each world by finishing with all flowers, red coins, and full 30 seconds on the timer, two hidden levels will unlock. There are three save slots on the cartridge.

The SNES version includes hidden 2-player minigames that can be accessed via a button combination. The Game Boy Advance version adds an exclusive bonus level for each world with 100% level completion. It also includes four-player support via link cable, but only to play Mario Bros., a pack-in feature also included on the other Super Mario Advance games.

== Development ==
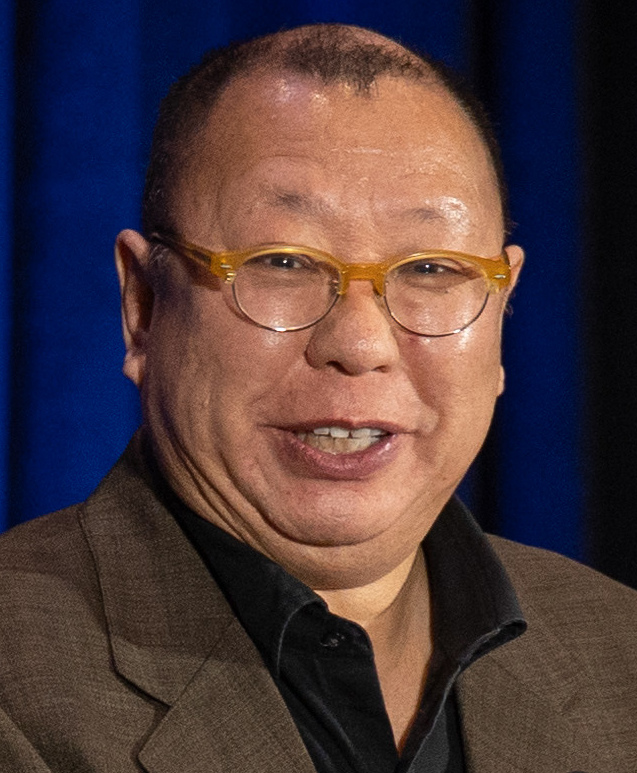
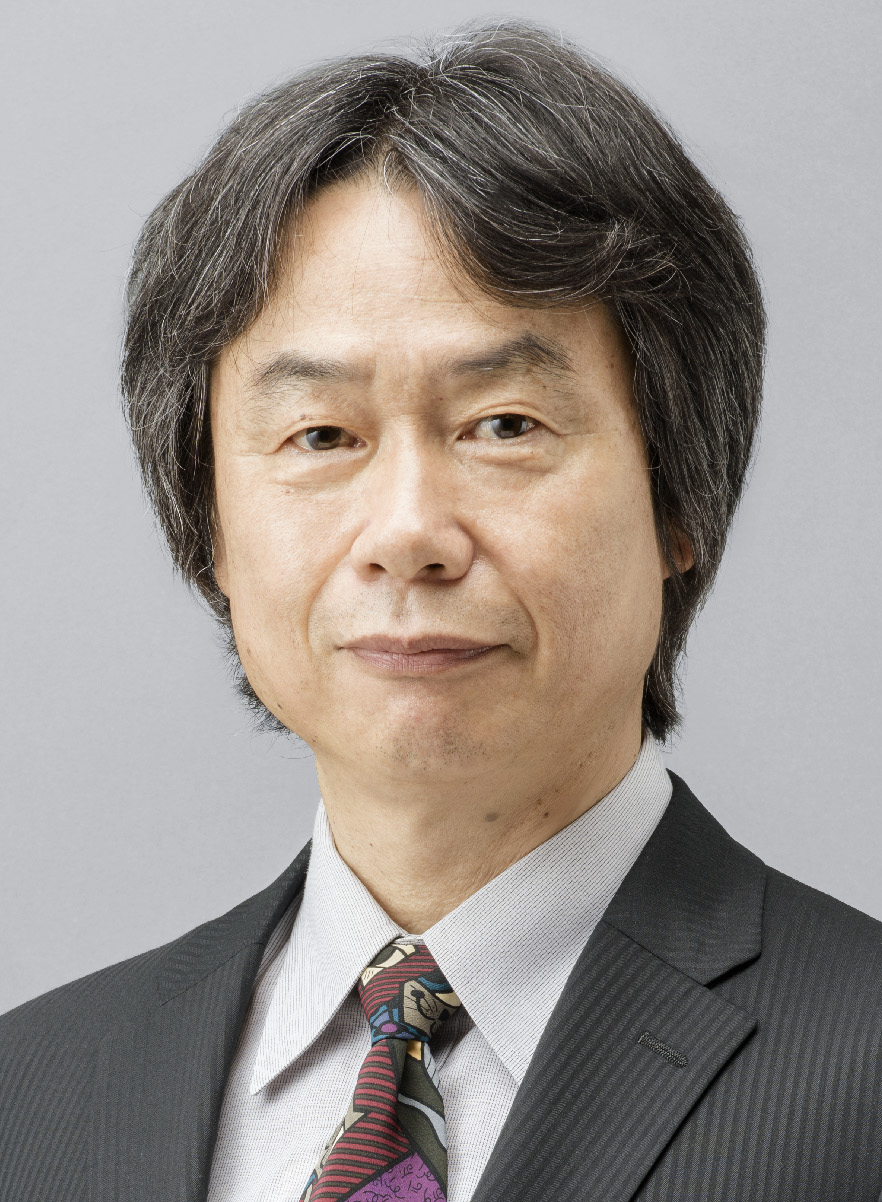
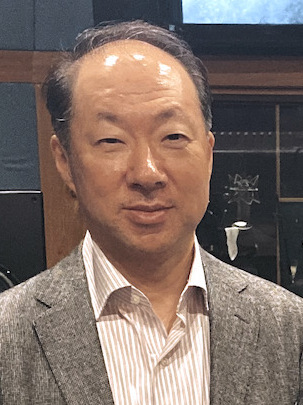
Co-director, producer, and composer in 2024, 2015, and 2019, respectively: Takashi Tezuka, Shigeru Miyamoto, and Koji Kondo.

Following his introduction in Super Mario World (1990), the character of Yoshi gained popularity and starred in puzzle game spin-offs such as Yoshi and Yoshi's Cookie. Mario creator Shigeru Miyamoto asked Yoshi's designer, Shigefumi Hino, to develop an original project. Hino felt that the Mario team had already explored every possible avenue with 2D Mario platformers (Miyamoto would soon begin work on the 3D Super Mario 64). After brainstorming, he landed on the idea of using Yoshi as the main character of a platform game, with the goal of being more accessible than previous Mario games. According to Hino, the developers then decided that Yoshi's goal in the game should be to carry Mario across the world map. The team originally chose to feature infant Mario as a justification for him not being able to walk independently. The conception of Yoshi's Island began in late 1990, shortly after the completion of Super Mario World.

To give the gameplay a more "gentle and relaxed pacing", the levels lack time limits and feature more exploration elements than previous games; Yoshi's flutter jump also makes him easier to control in the air than Mario. Yoshi's ability to lay and throw eggs was added to distinguish Yoshi's Island further from previous Mario games, none of which had prominently featured a throwing mechanic. Progression between levels was made linear so that players would improve their skills by replaying levels, as opposed to letting players avoid difficult levels on a world map.

In 2020, a prototype for a platform game with similar graphics to Yoshi's Island was discovered, featuring a different protagonist wearing a pilot suit. The title, Super Donkey, suggests it may have been considered as a new Donkey Kong game before being repurposed for Yoshi.

Yoshi's Island was developed by Nintendo EAD and published by Nintendo for the Super Nintendo Entertainment System (SNES) as part of the core Super Mario series. Production of Yoshi's Island began on February 1, 1992, and concluded on June 29, 1995. Development was spearheaded by Hino, Takashi Tezuka, Hideki Konno and Toshihiko Nakago. It was Nakago's only directing role after an 11-year apprenticeship, with Miyamoto as producer. Newly hired artist Hisashi Nogami created the unique marker-drawn style. The graphics were achieved by drawing them by hand, digitally scanning them, and then approximating them pixel-by-pixel. Yoshiaki Koizumi animated the opening and ending, while series composer Koji Kondo wrote the game's music.

Partway into the development of Yoshi's Island, Donkey Kong Country was released, which resulted in its computer-generated graphics becoming the norm for contemporary SNES games. After the game was first showcased to the public during the last Summer Consumer Electronics Show in June 1994, Miyamoto demoed an early version of Yoshi's Island to Nintendo's marketing department, who rejected it due to the visuals "lacking punch" in comparison to the pre-rendered graphics of Donkey Kong Country. It was too late for the graphic designers to incorporate such a style into Yoshi's Island; instead, they pushed the hand-drawn style further as a way to "fight back". As a compromise, the introductory and ending cutscenes feature a pre-rendered style, contrasting with the rest of the game. According to Miyamoto, Yoshi's Island was in development for four years, which let the team add "lots of magic tricks". The game cartridge used an extra microchip to support the game's rotation, scaling and other sprite-changing special effects. Yoshi's Island was designed to use the Super FX chip, but when Nintendo stopped supporting the chip, the game became the first to use Argonaut Games's Super FX2 microchip. Examples of chip-powered effects include 3D walls falling into the background, objects that are able to dynamically rotate and change size, and a psychedelic undulating effect when Yoshi touches floating fungi in the level "Touch Fuzzy, Get Dizzy".

== Release ==
Yoshi's Island was released in Japan in August 1995, and two months later in North America and Europe. In advertising, Nintendo referred to some of the visual effects made possible by the Super FX2 chip as "Morphmation". At the time of release, the SNES was at the end of its lifecycle, with Nintendo's next console, the Nintendo 64, due the following year.

Yoshi's Island was ported to the Game Boy Advance (GBA) as Yoshi's Island: Super Mario Advance 3 in North America on September 23, 2002. When it was previewed at E3 2002, IGN named Yoshi's Island "Best Platformer" on a handheld console. The GBA version adds Kazumi Totaka's voice as Yoshi and six new levels. The visible area was also reduced to fit the handheld's lower resolution. The new cartridge did not need an extra microchip to support the special effects.

At E3 2010, Nintendo demonstrated "classic" 2D games, including Yoshi's Island, on Nintendo 3DS as remastered 3D games with a "pop-up book feel". The GBA version was released for 3DS on December 16, 2011 as an exclusive reward for early adopters and for Wii U on April 24, 2014, with the multiplayer modes inaccessible in these rereleases. The SNES version was included as a part of the Super NES Classic Edition micro-console in 2017. The SNES and GBA versions were released on the Nintendo Classics service on September 5, 2019, and May 25, 2023, with the multiplayer modes supported locally and online.

== Reception ==
Reception

Aggregate score
Aggregator	Score
GameRankings	96%

Review scores
Publication	Score
Edge	9/10
Famitsu	9/10, 9/10, 8/10, 7/10
Game Informer	9.5/10
GameFan	100/100, 99/100, 100/100
GamePro	4.5/5
Next Generation	5/5

Yoshi's Island sold over 1 million copies in Japan by late 1995, and went on to sell 1.77 million. It has sold over four million copies worldwide, selling 4.12 million copies for the SNES.

Yoshi's Island received critical acclaim. At the time of its 1995 release, Matt Taylor of Diehard GameFan thought Yoshi's Island could be "possibly the best platform game of all time". Nintendo Power also said that the game was "one of the biggest, most beautiful games ever made". Next Generation was also most impressed by the game's "size and playability". Diehard GameFan's three reviewers gave the game a near-perfect score. To wit, Nicholas Dean Des Barres said it was "one of the handful of truly perfect games ever produced", and lamented that the magazine had given Donkey Kong Country, which he felt was a lackluster game in comparison, the extra single point for a perfect score. Casey Loe removed that one point for Baby Mario's "annoying screech". Nintendo Power and Nintendo Life also found Baby Mario's crying sounds annoying. Reviewing the SNES release over a decade later, Kaes Delgrego of Nintendo Life said the crying and some easy boss battles, while both minor, were the only shortcomings. Delgrego credited Yoshi's Island with perfecting the genre, calling it "perhaps the greatest platformer of all time".

Both contemporary and retrospective reviewers praised the art, level design, and gameplay, which became legacies of the game. Some called it "charm". Delgrego of Nintendo Life would stop mid-game just to watch what enemies would do. Martin Watts of the same publication called it "an absolute pleasure on the eyes and unlike any other SNES game". Others praised the control scheme, technical effects, and sound design. Nintendo Life's Delgrego felt "goosebumps and tingles" during the ending theme, and marked the soundtrack's range from the lighthearted intro to the "epic grandeur of the final boss battle". GamePro writer Major Mike noted, "[Yoshi's Island] doesn't rely on flashy graphics or jazzy effects to cover an empty game. This is one of the last of a dying breed: a 16-bit game that shows real heart and creativity."

Edge praised the game's balance of challenge and accessibility. The magazine thought that the new power-ups of Yoshi's Island gave its gameplay and level design great range, and that the powers were significant additions to the series on par with the suits of Super Mario Bros. 3 or Yoshi's own debut in Super Mario World. Diehard GameFan's Taylor wrote that there was enough gameplay innovation to make him cry and listed his favorites as the Baby Mario cape invincibility power-up, the machine gun-style seed spitting, and the snowball hill level. Nintendo Life's Watts called the egg stockpiling system "clever" for the way it encourages experimentation with the environment. Edge thought of Yoshi's Island as a "fusion of technology and creativity, each enhancing the other". The magazine considered the game's special effects expertly integrated into the gameplay, and described the developer's handicraft as having an "attention to detail that few games can match".

Game Boy Advance reviews

Aggregate score
Aggregator	Score
Metacritic	91/100

Review scores
Publication	Score
Edge	8/10
Eurogamer	9/10
Famitsu	8/10, 8/10, 7/10, 8/10
GameSpot	9.2/10
IGN	9.4/10
Nintendo Power	4/5, 4/5, 4/5, 4/5, 4.5/5

The Game Boy Advance version received similar praise. Reviewing the Game Boy Advance release in 2002, Craig Harris of IGN wrote that Yoshi's Island was "the best damn platformer ever developed". While acknowledging the game's roots in the Super Mario series, he said the game created enough gameplay ideas to constitute its own franchise. IGN's Lucas M. Thomas wrote that the game's story was also interesting as the origin story for the Mario brothers. Harris felt that the FX2 sprite-changing effects gave the game "life" and that the Game Boy Advance cartridge could handle the effects just as well. He added that Yoshi's morphing abilities and sound effects were designed well. Levi Buchanan of IGN said the game struck the right balance of tutorial by trial and error. Two reviewers in Famitsu said the game is more complex than previous Mario games, but were confident that the player would pick up on Yoshi's moves quickly. IGN's Harris also noted a few Game Boy Advance-specific issues: framerate drop in areas where a lot is happening onscreen, camera panning problems due to the screen's lower resolution, and a "poor" implementation of the "dizzy" special effect on the handheld release. Critics wrote that the "coloring book"-style graphics held up well. IGN's Harris felt it was the best of the Super Mario Advance games. Of the similar version for the Wii U, Watts of Nintendo Life also noticed the framerate issues and problems resulting from the screen's closer crop, which were "not enough to ruin the game, but ... noticeable". Edge felt that game's only disappointment was the linearity of its overworld following the exploratory Super Mario World and that the sequel would "inevitably ... have less impact". While one reviewer complimented the addition of Mario Bros. on the release, another said they would like a new bonus game in the Super Mario Advance series for the next title. One reviewer in the magazine also said the new bonus levels did not instill much freshness into the game.

It won for GameSpot's annual "Best Graphics on Game Boy Advance" award. During the 6th Annual Interactive Achievement Awards, it received a nomination for "Handheld Game of the Year" by the Academy of Interactive Arts & Sciences.

== Legacy ==
Retrospective reviews

Review score
Publication	Score
Nintendo Life	GBA: 9/10; SNES: 10/10

Retrospective reviews by IGN and NintendoLife declared Yoshi's Island a "masterpiece". IGN recalled it as "one of the most loved SNES adventures of all time". IGN's Lucas M. Thomas wrote it marked where Yoshi "came into his own" and developed many of his definitive characteristics: the "signature" flutter jump, and ability to throw eggs and transform shape. Baby Mario, who debuted in the game, featured in a number of sports-related games. The Nintendo producer Takashi Tezuka maintained the "handicraft feel" in later Yoshi games, which later included yarn and similar variations. Official Nintendo Magazine called the art style "a bold step ... that paid off handsomely". Delgrego of Nintendo Life wrote that the game marked a new era of art in video games that prioritized creativity over graphics technology.

Delgrego continued that the countdown-based life was a "revolutionary" mechanic that became ubiquitous in games like the Halo series. Martin Watts also of Nintendo Life considered Super Mario 64 to be a more momentous event in gaming history, but felt that Yoshi's Island was the "most significant" event in the "Mario Bros. timeline". In a retrospective, IGN wrote that SNES owners embraced the game alongside Donkey Kong Country.

IGN's Jared Petty wrote that Yoshi's Island bested "the test of time far better than many of its contemporaries". Levi Buchanan of IGN thought Nintendo took a risk with Yoshi's Island by making Mario passive and giving Yoshi new abilities. Christian Donlan of 1001 Video Games You Must Play Before You Die wrote that the game was a testament to the Mario team's "staggering confidence" in its development ability. He said the game was "perhaps the most imaginative platformer" of its time. In 1997 Electronic Gaming Monthly ranked it the 7th best console game of all time, saying it "is as much a piece of art as a game" and "is the epitome of platform gaming, falling only inches behind Super Mario Bros. 3 as the best 2-D platformer of all time." Yoshi's Island ranked 22nd on Official Nintendo Magazine's 2009 top 100 Nintendo games as a "bone fide classic", 15th on IGN's 2014 top 125 Nintendo games of all time, and second on USgamer's 2015 best Mario platformers list. In 2018, Complex listed the game 14th on its "The Best Super Nintendo Games of All Time". In 1996, GamesMaster ranked Yoshi's Island number 1 on their "The GamesMaster SNES Top 10." In the same issue, GamesMaster rated the game 45th in its "Top 100 Games of All Time."

In July 2020, a large amount of Nintendo data was leaked, including Yoshi's Island source data and several prototypes. A track based on the game was released for Mario Kart 8 Deluxe's Booster Course Pass on March 9, 2023, and for Mario Kart Tour the following month.

=== Sequels and spin-offs ===
Yoshi's Island led to a strong year for Yoshi as a character. IGN's Thomas wrote that the hand-drawn style of Yoshi's Island made the computer-generated Donkey Kong Country appear outdated, though both games sold well. Rareware included a Yoshi cameo in Donkey Kong Country 2: Diddy's Kong Quest, released that year. Yoshi's Island graphics and characters were also incorporated into the 1996 SNES puzzle game Tetris Attack.

Following Yoshi's Island's success, Nintendo developed Yoshi's Story, a 1997 platformer for the Nintendo 64. It was highly anticipated but received weaker reviews, with fetch quests and the 3D style Miyamoto eschewed in its predecessor. It expanded on Yoshi's character voice as introduced in Yoshi's Island, but also "dumbed down Yoshi's character". In 2004, Nintendo released the tilt sensor-controlled Yoshi Topsy Turvy for Game Boy Advance, which was developed by Artoon and received mixed reviews. The Nintendo-developed minigame Yoshi Touch & Go was released in 2005 for Nintendo DS.

In 2006, Nintendo published Yoshi's Island DS, also developed by Artoon. Titled Yoshi's Island 2 until just before it shipped, it retained the core concept of transporting baby Nintendo characters, and added the babies Princess Peach, Bowser, and Donkey Kong, each with a special ability. Yoshi had a similar moveset to Yoshi's Island and added dash and float abilities, but was more passive a character compared to the babies on his back. It received generally positive reviews. It was given high scores by IGN and GameSpot, who gave it 8/10 and 9.1/10 respectively. GameSpot commented that the developers have "produced a sequel that seems fresh and new while remaining every bit as awesome as the original" and IGN called it "a solid recreation of the Yoshi's Island elements in a two-screen-high format". In 2014, Nintendo released Yoshi's New Island for Nintendo 3DS. It was developed by former Artoon employees at their new company, Arzest. As in the original, Yoshi carries Baby Mario and throws eggs, and can now swallow large foes, which become large eggs that can destroy large obstacles. It received mixed reviews, with criticism for its graphics, art-style, soundtrack and similarity to the SNES original; though the level design and overall charm did attract some praise.

In 1001 Video Games You Must Play Before You Die (2010), Christian Donlan wrote that despite the "streamlined" Yoshi's Story and "brilliant" Yoshi's Touch and Go, "the original was never bettered and never truly advanced upon". In Eurogamer's 2015 preview of Yoshi's Woolly World, Tom Phillips wrote that it had "been 20 years since the last truly great Yoshi's Island". Yoshi's Woolly World received higher review scores than Yoshi's New Island but worse than Yoshi's Island DS and the original game, with reviewers praising the art style, gameplay, and innovation, but critiquing the easy difficulty. The next Mario 2D side-scroller, New Super Mario Bros., was released in 2006.

== See also ==
- List of Super Nintendo Entertainment System games
- 1995 in video games
