= Yoshi (video game series) =

- Genres: Arcade; Puzzle; Platform
- Developers: Nintendo (1993, 1995, 1997, 2005); Game Freak (1991); Bullet-Proof Software (1992); Intelligent Systems (1996); Artoon (2004, 2006); Arzest (2014); Good-Feel (2015−present)
- Publisher: Nintendo
- Platforms: NES; Game Boy; Game Boy Color; SNES; Nintendo 64; Game Boy Advance; Nintendo DS; Nintendo 3DS; Wii U; Nintendo Switch; Nintendo Switch 2
- First release: Yoshi; December 14, 1991
- Latest release: Yoshi and the Mysterious Book; May 21, 2026
- Parent series: Mario

Yoshi is a video game series developed and published by Nintendo. It is a spin-off of the Mario franchise. The games, primarily consisting of platform games and puzzle games featuring the titular character, have been developed by a variety of developers including Nintendo, Game Freak, Intelligent Systems, Artoon, its successor Arzest, Good-Feel and Bullet-Proof Software. Yoshi games have been released on Nintendo video game consoles and handhelds dating from the Nintendo Entertainment System (NES) to the current generation of video game consoles. Several games in the series have been ported to the Game Boy Advance or the Virtual Console.

The series revolves around Yoshis, a species of dinosaur-like creatures. They were first introduced in the 1990 Super Nintendo Entertainment System (SNES) game Super Mario World, where Mario and Luigi can ride on them.

The first Yoshi game was the NES puzzle game released in 1991, Yoshi, which was developed by Game Freak. The first game in what is considered the main series, as well as the first to feature Yoshis in a playable main-character role, is the 1995 SNES game Super Mario World 2: Yoshi's Island, which introduces staples of the series such as colorful storybook graphics and numerous gameplay elements. It serves as a prequel to the Super Mario series alongside its sequels, and features Yoshis that traverse levels with Baby Mario, Luigi and other characters. The antagonists of this series are Baby Bowser, the young king of the Koopas, and Kamek, a Magikoopa who was Bowser's caretaker as a child; they recur in other Yoshi games without said Mario characters.

Yoshi's Story, released on the Nintendo 64 in 1997, took a more puzzle-oriented approach, as did Yoshi's Universal Gravitation and Yoshi Touch & Go, released respectively on the Game Boy Advance in 2004 and on the DS in 2005. The next entries were Yoshi's Island DS, released on the DS in 2006, Yoshi's New Island, released on the 3DS in 2014, Yoshi's Woolly World, released on the Wii U in 2015 and later on the 3DS in 2017, and Yoshi's Crafted World on the Nintendo Switch in 2019. The latest game, Yoshi and the Mysterious Book, was released on the Nintendo Switch 2 on May 21, 2026.

== Video games ==
=== Main series ===
Game	Details
Super Mario World 2: Yoshi's Island Original release date(s): JP: August 5, 1995; NA: October 4, 1995; PAL: October 6, 1995	Release years by system: 1995 - Super Nintendo Entertainment System; 2002 - Game Boy Advance; 2011 - Nintendo 3DS Virtual Console (GBA version; Ambassador Program exclusive); 2014 - Wii U Virtual Console (GBA version); 2019 - Nintendo Classics (SNES version); 2023 - Nintendo Classics (GBA version)
Super Mario World 2: Yoshi's Island Original release date(s): JP: August 5, 1995; NA: October 4, 1995; PAL: October 6, 1995	Notes: Known as Super Mario: Yoshi Island (Note: Japanese: スーパーマリオ ヨッシーアイランド, Hepburn: Sūpā Mario: Yosshī Airando) in Japan; The title was developed by Nintendo.; It is the first platforming game in the Yoshi series.; It was ported to the Game Boy Advance in 2002.; The GBA version was released for the 3DS Virtual Console in 2011 and the Wii U Virtual Console in 2014.; The original version was included on the Super NES Classic Edition.; The SNES version was released for Nintendo Classics in 2019 and the GBA version was released in 2023.
Yoshi's Story Original release date(s): JP: December 21, 1997; NA: March 10, 1998; PAL: May 10, 1998	Release years by system: 1997 - Nintendo 64; 2007 - Wii Virtual Console; 2016 - Wii U Virtual Console; 2021 - Nintendo Classics
Yoshi's Story Original release date(s): JP: December 21, 1997; NA: March 10, 1998; PAL: May 10, 1998	Notes: The title was developed by Nintendo.; It was re-released for Wii Virtual Console in 2007 and Wii U Virtual Console in 2016.
Yoshi's Universal Gravitation Original release date(s): JP: December 9, 2004; PAL: April 22, 2005; NA: June 13, 2005	Release years by system: 2004 - Game Boy Advance
Yoshi's Universal Gravitation Original release date(s): JP: December 9, 2004; PAL: April 22, 2005; NA: June 13, 2005	Notes: Known as Yoshi Topsy-Turvy in North America; The title was developed by Artoon.
Yoshi Touch & Go Original release date(s): JP: January 27, 2005; NA: March 14, 2005; EU: May 6, 2005; AU: May 19, 2005	Release years by system: 2005 - Nintendo DS; 2015 - Wii U Virtual Console
Yoshi Touch & Go Original release date(s): JP: January 27, 2005; NA: March 14, 2005; EU: May 6, 2005; AU: May 19, 2005	Notes: Known as Catch! Touch! Yoshi! in Japan; The title was developed by Nintendo.; It was re-released for Wii U Virtual Console in 2015.
Yoshi's Island DS Original release date(s): NA: November 13, 2006; AU: November 17, 2006; EU: December 1, 2006; JP: March 8, 2007	Release years by system: 2006 - Nintendo DS; 2015 - Wii U Virtual Console
Yoshi's Island DS Original release date(s): NA: November 13, 2006; AU: November 17, 2006; EU: December 1, 2006; JP: March 8, 2007	Notes: The title was developed by Artoon.; It was re-released for Wii U Virtual Console in 2015.
Yoshi's New Island Original release date(s): NA: March 14, 2014; EU: March 14, 2014; AU: March 15, 2014; JP: July 24, 2014	Release years by system: 2014 - Nintendo 3DS
Yoshi's New Island Original release date(s): NA: March 14, 2014; EU: March 14, 2014; AU: March 15, 2014; JP: July 24, 2014	Notes: The title was developed by Arzest.
Yoshi's Woolly World Original release date(s): AU: June 25, 2015; EU: June 26, 2015; JP: July 16, 2015; NA: October 16, 2015	Release years by system: 2015 - Wii U 2017 - Nintendo 3DS
Yoshi's Woolly World Original release date(s): AU: June 25, 2015; EU: June 26, 2015; JP: July 16, 2015; NA: October 16, 2015	Notes: The title was developed by Good-Feel, who previously developed Kirby's Epic Yarn.; The game was ported to the Nintendo 3DS as Poochy and Yoshi's Woolly World in 2017.
Yoshi's Crafted World Original release date(s): WW: March 29, 2019	Release years by system: 2019 - Nintendo Switch
Yoshi's Crafted World Original release date(s): WW: March 29, 2019	Notes: The title was developed by Good-Feel using Unreal Engine 4.
Yoshi and the Mysterious Book Original release date(s): WW: May 21, 2026	Release years by system: 2026 - Nintendo Switch 2
Yoshi and the Mysterious Book Original release date(s): WW: May 21, 2026	Notes: The title was developed by Good-Feel using Unreal Engine 5.

=== Spin-offs ===
Game	Details
Yoshi Original release date(s): JP: December 14, 1991; NA: June 1, 1992; PAL: December 10, 1992	Release years by system: 1991 - Nintendo Entertainment System; 1991 - Game Boy; 2007 - Virtual Console
Yoshi Original release date(s): JP: December 14, 1991; NA: June 1, 1992; PAL: December 10, 1992	Notes: Known as Yoshi's Egg in Japan and Mario & Yoshi in the PAL region; It was developed by Game Freak.; It was re-released for Wii, 3DS, and Wii U Virtual Consoles.; It was released for Nintendo Classics
Yoshi's Cookie Original release date(s): JP: November 21, 1992; NA: April 1993; PAL: 1993	Release years by system: 1992 - Nintendo Entertainment System; 1992 - Game Boy; 1993 - Super Nintendo Entertainment System; 2008 - Wii Virtual Console
Yoshi's Cookie Original release date(s): JP: November 21, 1992; NA: April 1993; PAL: 1993	Notes: It was developed by Bullet-Proof Software and published by Nintendo for the Nintendo Entertainment System and Game Boy.; The Super Nintendo Entertainment System version of the title was published by Bullet-Proof Software.; It was included in the GameCube compilation Nintendo Puzzle Collection.; It was re-released on Wii Virtual Console in 2008 and was available until 2013.
Yoshi's Safari Original release date(s): JP: July 14, 1993; NA: September 17, 1993; PAL: November 19, 1993	Release years by system: 1993 - Super Nintendo Entertainment System
Yoshi's Safari Original release date(s): JP: July 14, 1993; NA: September 17, 1993; PAL: November 19, 1993	Notes: It was developed by Nintendo.; It is a light gun shooter game.
Tetris Attack Original release date(s): JP: October 27, 1995; NA: August 11, 1996; PAL: November 28, 1996	Release years by system: 1995 - Super Nintendo Entertainment System; 1996 - Game Boy
Tetris Attack Original release date(s): JP: October 27, 1995; NA: August 11, 1996; PAL: November 28, 1996	Notes: A reskin of the Japanese game Panel de Pon, rebranded to use characters and settings from Super Mario World 2: Yoshi's Island. A Japanese version of this rebranded title, Yoshi's Panepon, (Note: Japanese: ヨッシーのパネポン, Hepburn: Yoshi no Panepon) was released in Japan for the Satellaview satellite modem service.; It was developed by Intelligent Systems.

=== Cancelled games ===
Game	Details
Yoshi Racing Original release date(s): Cancelled	Release years by system: Cancelled - Nintendo 64
Yoshi Racing Original release date(s): Cancelled	Notes: In 1996, Argonaut Games approached Nintendo with a tech demo of a proposed 3D Yoshi game for Nintendo 64. Nintendo, however, rejected the pitch, ending all future business relations between the two companies. The game was then eventually turned into a similar but unrelated game titled Croc: Legend of the Gobbos, developed by Argonaut Games, released by Fox Interactive for the PlayStation, Sega Saturn and Microsoft Windows, and followed by a sequel, Croc 2, which was released for the PlayStation and Microsoft Windows.
Yoshi Sample Original release date(s): Cancelled	Release years by system: Cancelled - Game Boy Advance
Yoshi Sample Original release date(s): Cancelled	Notes: The demo was shown off when Nintendo first unveiled the Game Boy Advance to U.S. game developers. It was a tech demo that was mainly derived from Yoshi's Story. The gameplay drastically differed from the original game. For instance, Yoshi could not throw eggs or use his tongue. The demo was meant to show off the graphical capabilities of the Game Boy Advance and it was never released as a completed game.

== Reception ==
Sales and aggregate review scores As of November 6, 2025.
Game	Year	Units sold	Metacritic	OpenCritic
Yoshi's Island	1995 (SNES); 2002 (GBA)	4 million (SNES)	91/100 (GBA)	—
Yoshi's Story	1997	2.85 million	65/100	—
Yoshi's Universal Gravitation	2004		60/100	—
Yoshi Touch & Go	2005		73/100	—
Yoshi's Island DS	2006	2.91 million	81/100	—
Yoshi's New Island	2014	2.06 million	64/100	15% recommend
Yoshi's Woolly World	2015	1.37 million	78/100	70% recommend (Wii U); 59% recommend (3DS)
Yoshi's Crafted World	2019	3.35 million	79/100	81% recommend

Reception toward Yoshi games has been largely positive. Yoshi's Island is the most well-received entry, holding a critic score of 91/100 on the review aggregation website Metacritic, the highest for any Yoshi game on the site. Conversely, Yoshi's Universal Gravitation is the worst-received title, holding a critic rating of 60/100 on the same site.
