= Yoshi Touch & Go =

2005 video game

- North American box art
- Developer: Nintendo EAD
- Publishers: Nintendo, iQue (China)
- Director: Hiroyuki Kimura
- Producer: Takashi Tezuka
- Designer: Shigeyuki Asuke
- Programmer: Keizo Ota
- Artist: Masanao Arimoto
- Composers: Toru Minegishi; Asuka Hayazaki; Kazumi Totaka
- Series: Yoshi
- Platform: Nintendo DS
- Release: JP: January 27, 2005; NA: March 14, 2005; EU: May 6, 2005; AU: May 19, 2005; CHN: February 14, 2006
- Genre: Platform
- Modes: Single-player, multiplayer

Yoshi Touch & Go, known in Japan as Catch! Touch! Yoshi! (キャッチ!タッチ!ヨッシー!, Kyatchi! Tatchi! Yosshī!), is a video game that was developed and published by Nintendo for the Nintendo DS. It debuted in Japan on January 27, 2005, in North America on March 14, 2005, in Europe on May 6, 2005, and in Australia on May 19, 2005. As of August 2007, the game sold 197,337 units in Japan. Yoshi Touch & Go was produced by Takashi Tezuka and directed by Hiroyuki Kimura. The game was released for the Wii U Virtual Console on April 9, 2015.

The game revolves around Yoshi and Baby Mario/Baby Luigi. Its graphical style and the cast of characters originate from Yoshi's Island. It is based around using the DS's touch screen capabilities and the microphone to control the characters. The game is endless and its challenge comes from replaying the same modes over and over to get the best possible score, similar to the classic arcade games of the 1980s. The game received mixed or average reviews from critics, with praise for its unique premise and gameplay but criticism for its lack of a storyline with a proper ending and its simplicity coupled with low amount of content.

== Gameplay ==
The game begins with three different gameplay modes: "Score Attack", "Marathon", and the "multiplayer vs. mode". Additionally, the player can unlock "Time Attack" and "Challenge modes" by getting the high score in the "Score Attack" and "Marathon" modes. When the high score on the two new modes is achieved, the mini-game "Balloon Trip" is unlocked. There are two basic level types: a vertical level, where the player must lead Baby Mario through the sky safely to the ground; and a side-scrolling level, where the player takes control over different colored Yoshis, carrying Baby Mario on their back.

As opposed to the earlier Yoshi games, in Yoshi Touch & Go, the player cannot take direct control over the characters. Instead, the Yoshis move from the left to the right automatically at a certain speed. However, the player can draw lines on the lower screen with the stylus, which creates clouds that will support a character. This attribute allows the creation of alternate routes to avoid enemies and obstacles. The player can blow into the microphone to eliminate drawn clouds, and stop them from accidentally impeding progress. Enemies can be dispatched by drawing circles on them, which puts most of them into a bubble. In the side-scrolling level, a Yoshi can make an egg out of fruits by leading them to its mouth. By tapping on the screen, the Yoshi will launch an egg in that direction, which is useful for defeating enemies or collecting coins and fruits. By tapping on a Yoshi himself, the player can make him jump, and tapping him again while he's in midair will cause him to do a flutter-kick jump.

The Nintendo DS's two screens act as one tall screen, whereas the player can only create clouds on the lower one. However, by throwing eggs in the upper screen it is possible to collect coins or fruits from there. The wireless "multiplayer vs. mode" is an exception to this general layout, as only the lower screen shows the player's view, while the upper screen shows that of the enemy. In the multiplayer mode, the goal is to be faster than the opponent. By clearing out enemies on their own screen, the player can cause spiky obstacles to appear on the opponent's screen.

In some modes, there is a star point counter. Once this reaches 100, a Super Star will appear. If Yoshi touches it or the player drags it to Yoshi, Baby Mario will temporarily become Super Baby Mario, who is considerably faster than Yoshi and has unlimited stars (instead of eggs) to throw. The star points will then return to zero. Also, by feeding fruits to Yoshi a certain number of eggs will be replenished. The number of replenished eggs depends on the fruit consumed (for instance, an apple only refills one egg, while melons refill twenty).

The color of Yoshi that Baby Mario rides depends on the player's score in the vertical falling part of the game. If the player gets 60 points, he will ride a light blue Yoshi, and then the color will go up a level for every other 20 points scored (for instance, pink Yoshi at 80 points, blue Yoshi at 100 points, etc.). The only two exceptions are white and orange Yoshi: In Marathon mode, when Baby Mario changes Yoshis, depending on the player's performance he might start riding a white Yoshi, who will switch to black Yoshi unless it's at the 10,000 meters mark, in which case he will switch over to orange Yoshi. It will then switch to purple Yoshi at 20,000 meters in Marathon. In challenge mode, after the high score is beaten, getting 0 points in the Baby Mario segment of future games will unlock a fast purple Yoshi. The same applies to time attack where a white Yoshi, which has unlimited eggs, can be unlocked.

== Development ==
According to director Hiroyuki Kimura and designer Keizo Ohta, Yoshi Touch & Go was originally planned to be designed for the GameCube as Balloon Trip. A demo of the game was first exhibited during the E3 of 2004 and gained positive responses, causing the executives of Nintendo to greenlight the project. Shigeru Miyamoto felt that the game would create a bigger impact as a DS title.

Yoshi Touch & Go was produced by Takashi Tezuka and directed by Hiroyuki Kimura. The game's musical score was created by Toru Minegishi, Asuka Ohta, and Kazumi Totaka. Baby Mario and Baby Luigi were voiced by Charles Martinet while the voice-over of the Yoshis was done by Totaka, including the 19-note song he performed.

== Reception ==
Reception

Aggregate score
Aggregator	Score
Metacritic	73/100

Review scores
Publication	Score
1Up.com	A−
Edge	8/10
Electronic Gaming Monthly	7.83/10 (Note: Two critics of Electronic Gaming Monthly gave the game each a score of 7.5/10, and the other gave it 8.5/10.)
Eurogamer	6/10
Famitsu	35/40
Game Informer	7.5/10
GameRevolution	C
GameSpot	7.2/10
GameSpy	3.5/5
IGN	8.8/10
Nintendo Life	6/10
Nintendo Power	3.6/5
Nintendo World Report	(JP) 8.5/10 (US) 7.5/10
Pocket Gamer	4/5
X-Play	3/5
The Sydney Morning Herald	4/5
USA Today	3.5/5

The game received "mixed or average reviews" according to the review aggregation website Metacritic. In Japan, Famitsu gave it a score of one eight and three nines for a total of 35 out of 40. Craig Harris of IGN said it "is one of the most original and unique games created for the system so far, and it's truly a design that's unlike anything you've played before." Additionally, it won the IGN Editors' Choice Award on March 11, 2005. GamePro said that the game "looks like [a] cute, cuddly, and safe bit of fluff [that] turns out to be a semi-tough platform style game where you draw the platforms." (Note: GamePro gave the game three 4/5 scores for graphics, control, and fun factor, and 3.5/5 for sound.) GameZone gave the game 8.2 out of 10, saying, "It would have been better had the game been longer and the designers tried breaking the mold in terms of the look and sound of the game." 1Up.com gave the game an A− and said, "On the surface, Touch & Go looks simple, but don't be deceived. Hidden behind the candy-coated graphics and seemingly straightforward gameplay lies surprising depth and playability."

Some reviewers criticized Yoshi Touch & Go for its lack of storyline and the simple gameplay. GameSpot's Ryan Davis found that he was "going through the same few levels over and over again" and thought the multiplayer mode was not very compelling, concluding that although "the gameplay concepts... are quite good", the overall package "simply lacks substance." Also, the game gathered negative criticism for its price, which was described as too high by some critics.

Touch & Go was a moderate success, selling 197,337 units in Japan.
