= Yoshi's Universal Gravitation =

2004 video game

Yoshi's Universal Gravitation Yoshi Topsy-Turvy
- European box art
- Developer: Artoon
- Publisher: Nintendo
- Directors: Hidetoshi Takeshita; Hiroto Saiki
- Producers: Masaki Tawara; Naoto Ohshima
- Artist: Yasuhisa Nakagawa
- Composers: Tatsuyuki Maeda; Masaru Setsumaru; Mariko Nanba
- Series: Yoshi
- Platform: Game Boy Advance
- Release: JP: December 9, 2004; PAL: April 22, 2005; NA: June 13, 2005
- Genre: Platform
- Mode: Single-player

Yoshi's Universal Gravitation (Note: Japanese: ヨッシーの万有引力, Hepburn: Yosshī no Ban'yū Inryoku) (released in North America as Yoshi Topsy-Turvy) is a 2004 platform game developed by Artoon and published by Nintendo for the Game Boy Advance. It features a built-in tilt sensor, which is used to manipulate the game's environment. By tilting the Game Boy Advance left or right, the player can tilt the game area, causing enemies and other objects to slide as the direction of gravity changes. This gameplay mechanic is used to solve puzzles or aid Yoshi in completing levels. The game received mixed reviews; with praise for its aesthetics and premise, mixed opinions about its usage of tilt controls, and criticism for its short length compared to other Yoshi games and its repetitive level design and objectives.

== Gameplay ==
Each course is controlled by a spirit, each with an obsession—one loves money, one loves fast things, one loves friendliness, one loves strength, etc. They will set out guidelines for the course, such as collecting fruit to free a certain number of Egglings, finishing a course before time runs out, finding a certain number of coins or defeating—or not defeating—a certain number of enemies. By satisfying that spirit's requirements, players pass the course.

Yoshi can jump and stick out his tongue to eat fruit or enemies. After eating an enemy, Yoshi will produce a small puff of air instead of making eggs. The main feature of the game is the tilt mechanism. By moving the Game Boy Advance side to side, players tilt the world around Yoshi, causing enemies to roll around, swinging ships and pendulums, and bouncing items all over the place. An impassable wall will become a climbable slope, or a rolled-up carpet will become a long platform. Each environment requires players to master not only button presses but also tilt movements to progress.

== Plot ==
When Bowser starts wreaking havoc on Yoshi's Island, a book spirit named Hongo traps the island within the pages of a storybook. Only by locking Bowser away can Yoshi convince Hongo to release the rest of the island. So he sets out to progress through the chapters of the book.

== Reception ==
Reception

Aggregate scores
| Aggregator | Score |
|---|---|
| GameRankings | 61.12% |
| Metacritic | 60/100 |

Review scores
| Publication | Score |
|---|---|
| 1Up.com | D+ |
| Eurogamer | 6/10 |
| Game Informer | 8/10 |
| GameSpot | 6.6/10 |
| IGN | 5/10 |
| Nintendo Power | 7/10 |
| Nintendo World Report | 7.5/10 |

At the time of its release, most critics thought of Yoshi's Universal Gravitation as a mediocre title. The game's score of 60/100 from the review aggregation website Metacritic, indicating "mixed or average" reviews from critics, is the lowest for any Yoshi title. Craig Harris of IGN said the game was too short, and most critics thought the other Game Boy Advance game to use a tilt sensor, WarioWare: Twisted!, was a better example of tilt-sensing technology in video games. 1UP.com's Jeremy Parish called the tilt controls "graceless and clumsy" and the character animations "choppy", concluding that it was a "mediocre" and "boring" game. GameSpot's Justin Calvert thought the tilting worked alright and enjoyed the graphics and difficulty curve, but overall found the game to be "repetitive and disappointingly short". Game Informer enjoyed the tilt sensing, calling it a "neat" and "inventive" mechanic that "breathe[d] new life into the [platformer] genre", but was disappointed by the level designs, which were mostly "pretty standard fare."

== See also ==
- Koro Koro Puzzle Happy Panechu!
- Kirby Tilt 'n' Tumble
- WarioWare: Twisted!
- List of Game Boy Advance games
- 2004 in video games
