= Yoshi's Story =

1997 video game

- North American box art
- Developer: Nintendo EAD
- Publisher: Nintendo
- Director: Hideki Konno
- Producer: Takashi Tezuka
- Designer: Katsuya Eguchi
- Programmer: Masaru Nii
- Artist: Shigefumi Hino
- Composer: Kazumi Totaka
- Series: Yoshi
- Platforms: Nintendo 64, iQue Player
- Release: Nintendo 64: JP: December 21, 1997; NA: March 10, 1998; PAL: May 10, 1998; iQue Player: CHN: March 25, 2004
- Genres: Platform, action-adventure
- Mode: Single-player

Yoshi's Story (Note: Japanese: ヨッシーストーリー, Hepburn: Yosshīsu Sutōrī) is a 1997 platform game published and developed by Nintendo for the Nintendo 64. Following the Super NES game Yoshi's Island (1995), it is the second main installment in the Yoshi series. It was released in Japan in December 1997, and worldwide the following year. The game has been subsequently re-released on the Wii, Wii U, and Nintendo Switch.

Development was handled by Nintendo EAD and led by Hideki Konno and Takashi Tezuka. It was not directed by Shigeru Miyamoto, although he contributed design ideas and acted as supervisor for the game. The score was composed by Kazumi Totaka, who provided the voice of Yoshi in the game. Continuing within the platform genre with gameplay similar to its predecessor, Yoshi's Story is more puzzle-oriented, with most challenges being tied to the strategic achievement of a high score. Taking place within a pop-up storybook, the game features vivid pre-rendered 3D graphics, illustrating worlds that are crafted from different materials, such as cardboard, fabrics, plastic, and wood. The game received mixed reviews from critics, who responded unfavorably to its low difficulty level, although its art style, audio, and graphics were praised.

== Gameplay ==
Yoshi aiming an egg at a swarm of Shy Guys. In each level, collecting fruit (shown lining the edge of the screen) is required to complete each level.

The player may choose between two different game modes from the game's main menu: Story Mode and Trial Mode. Upon entering either mode, the player can select a course, find out which fruit will be the Lucky Fruit, and choose a Yoshi of desired color to play as. Trial Mode allows the player to select and replay any course previously cleared in Story Mode.

On each course, the goal is to fill the Fruit Frame by eating 30 pieces of fruit. These may be found in abundance throughout every course, lying around, floating in bubbles, and carried by some enemies. The puzzle element of the game encourages the player to apply strategy to achieve a high score. For instance, the player gains more points from eating one kind of a fruit in a row, and even more so if the fruit is a Favorite Fruit or a Lucky Fruit. Melons give the most points, and each level has exactly 30 of them hidden throughout. In addition, valuable secrets are hidden throughout every course that will contribute to the total score.

The courses are spread across six pages, containing four courses each. The courses are sorted by difficulty, and the choice of which course to play is made individually for each page. While the first page will always display four courses, the following pages will initially be limited to only one course. In order to unlock the remaining courses, the player must seek out and collect Special Hearts. Each course has three collectable hearts, and the number of hearts collected determines the number of additional courses that are unlocked on the following page. For example, if the player collects two hearts during a course, they will be allowed to choose from course 1, 2, and 3 on the next page.

The abilities of Yoshis include running, ducking, jumping, ground pounding, temporary hovering, and hurling eggs. Eggs no longer ricochet off walls and the ground, and Yoshis no longer have the option of spitting out enemies, which are turned into eggs as soon as they are swallowed. Two Yoshi colors are unlockable within the game, White Yoshi and Black Yoshi. If both are found, they give two extra lives.

== Plot ==
Living together in harmony at Yoshi Island, the Yoshis are able to maintain a perpetual state of joy through eating the fruit of the Super Happy Tree. Baby Bowser becomes envious of this happiness and casts a spell to transform the island into a pop-up storybook. He steals the Super Happy Tree, further weakening the Yoshis and making them fall to gloom.

Six eggs were able to survive the trial and hatch. Confused about the dismal state of their world, the baby Yoshis know that something is amiss and decide to fight the gloom with cheer. They set out to retrieve the Super Happy Tree and restore happiness to the island.

On their way to Baby Bowser's castle, the Yoshis must progress through the six pages of the storybook, encountering six different areas of the island. While each page consists of four courses each, the path to Baby Bowser's castle will only consist of one course per page. After progressing to the castle and completing one of the final courses, the Yoshi in play will face Baby Bowser in a final showdown. Following his defeat, a final narration will convey the story from each of the six pages and courses the Yoshis went through, ending with the Yoshis standing together in joy, encircling the Super Happy Tree. But if one gets knocked out, a cutscene shows Kamek's minions kidnapping Yoshi, removing that Yoshi from the game.

== Development ==
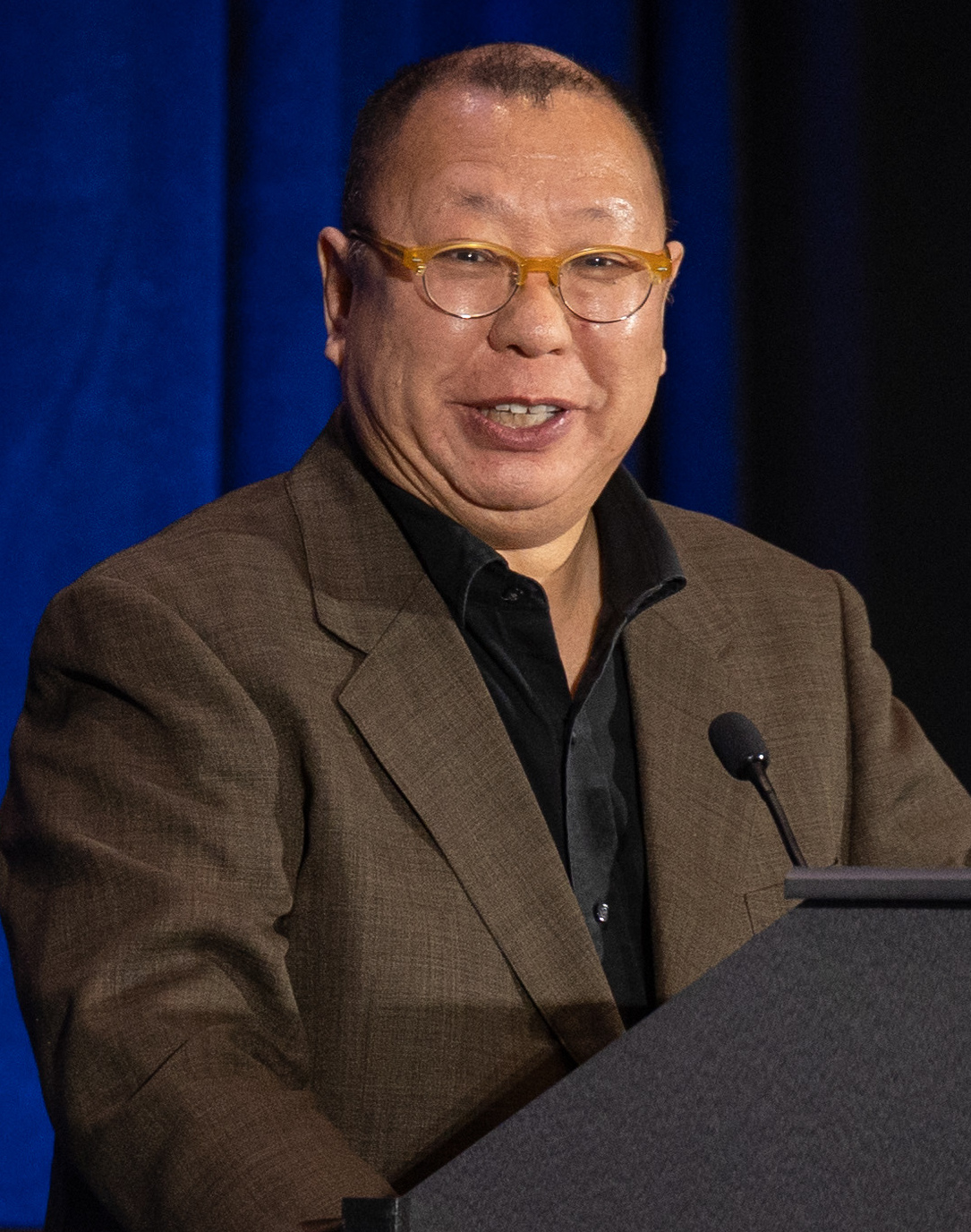
Producer Takashi Tezuka in 2024

Originally titled Yoshi's Island 64 for the 64DD floppy drive and then moved to cartridge instead, the game was developed by the Yoshi's Island team, directed by Hideki Konno and produced by Takashi Tezuka. With the first promotional video clip from the game being revealed at Nintendo Space World in November 1996, Yoshi's Island 64 presented lush, colorful worlds of pre-rendered 3D graphics and polygonal animations, also demonstrating the Nintendo 64's ability to run 2D games. Shigeru Miyamoto said the 2D format was necessary to create the artistic style of graphics the development team wanted. Nintendo described the game as "2.5D". The game's title was eventually changed to Yoshi's Story, being announced in August 1997, with a release of promotional screenshots from upcoming games. Shortly after, the game was noted to be getting a memory expansion, extending from 96 to 128 megabits. The completed game was unveiled at Nintendo Space World in November 1997.

With the game's initial release hitting Japan on December 21, 1997, the international release was delayed from the fourth quarter of 1997 to February 9, 1998. Reviews from the press said the game was too easy and unrewarding. Nintendo of America would thus demand the difficulty bar of the game to be raised. With extra time to polish the game, several changes were made to the international release, including graphical cleanup; the addition of white fences on cardboard courses; Egg Blocks with colors matching the Yoshi in play; new locations for some items; a slightly different ending when the player finishes a course with only melons; and additional secrets, including hidden coin formations that spell out letters. Furthermore, the updated version also added a save feature to Story Mode, allowing the player to continue the game from the last page reached.

=== Audio ===
The game's overall sound effects were designed by Hajime Wakai and the palette of vocal expressions for Yoshi were recorded by Kazumi Totaka. The recorded samples have since been constituting the official voice for Yoshi, making a second appearance in the 1999 game Super Smash Bros., to further be recycled in succeeding games that Yoshi appeared in. This trend was eventually interrupted in 2009 with the release of New Super Mario Bros. Wii, which used the original Yoshi cry from Super Mario World in homage to that game.

In addition to providing the voice for Yoshi, Totaka also composed the game's music. The game features an interactive soundtrack, where the music will change dynamically. For example, if Yoshi is harmed to the point where the Smile Meter has no remaining petals, the music will sweep down to a lower pitch and tempo, reflecting his dreary mood. But if Yoshi eats a Heart Fruit and becomes Super Happy, the music will instantly switch to a rock version of the currently playing theme. Totaka has hidden his 19-note signature melody in the game, which may be heard on the Trial Mode course select screen, after the background music has looped eight times.

Prior to the game's release, a promotional soundtrack was released in North America, titled Music to Pound the Ground To: Yoshi's Story Game Soundtrack. Published by The Original Shape CD, Inc., the 15-track CD had the characteristic trait of being shaped to outline the print on the disc, illustrating Yoshi's head. However, as an asymmetrically shaped CD, it raises compatibility issues with most non-portable CD players. The full soundtrack was released in Japan on February 4, 1998, published by Pony Canyon. The third and last issue of the soundtrack, Love, Peace & Happiness: The Original Yoshi's Story Soundtrack, contained 28 tracks, and was released in Germany by Nintendo of Europe on April 9, 1998.

=== Game Boy Advance tech demo ===
When Nintendo unveiled the Game Boy Advance to U.S. game developers on April 10, 2000, one of the available demonstrations was a tech demo derived from Yoshi's Story. It was specifically developed to show off the Game Boy Advance's graphical capacity, featuring an opening demo and a single looping course. The opening displayed a pre-rendered rotating island, resembling the shape of a Yoshi, taking advantage of the system's affine rotate-and-zoom feature (akin to the Super Nintendo's Mode 7) to render a seascape in perspective. The demo's level design was based on the colorful cardboard theme of Yoshi's Story. However, the gameplay differed significantly from the original game. For instance, Yoshi was unable to use his tongue; nor could he throw eggs, in spite of being able to obtain them. Screenshots from the demo show the presence of giant Shy Guys, that were primarily designed to demonstrate system's advancement from the Game Boy Color's 10 sprites per line limit. In spite of the fact that Nintendo had published a promotional image of a Game Boy Advance with the tech demo running on it, it was never released as a completed game. The tech demo has been salvaged and showcased its functionality as a game.

=== Re-releases ===
Yoshi's Story was re-released on the Wii's Virtual Console service in October 2007, and for the Wii U's Virtual Console in early 2016. It was also re-released on the Nintendo Classics service in October 2021.

== Marketing and sales ==
According to the Japanese magazine Famitsu, Yoshi's Story sold 53,428 copies on the day of its release in Japan. As a result, it gained the number seven rank in Famitsu's top ten best-selling video games chart. The game sold an additional 118,502 copies in the region by January 4, 1998, dropping to the number eight spot. By the end of that year, Yoshi's Story sold a total of 618,789 copies in Japan, making it the 27th best-selling video game in the country in 1998. In the German market, it sold 150,000 units from January through September 1998. This made it the region's sixth-best-selling console game of the period.

Nintendo intended to release Yoshi's Story in North America by the 1997 holiday season, but the release was delayed until March 1998. A Nintendo official said that the delay was "based on us demanding A-plus quality." Once the game was completed, Nintendo initially shipped 800,000 units from Japan to American retailers. Retailers were concerned that there would be shortages (like there had been for GoldenEye 007), but a Nintendo official promised that the shipment would satisfy demand.

In an effort to promote the game in the U.S., Nintendo direct-mailed advertisements to recent console buyers; put advertisements in gaming and children's magazines; and aired a 30-second television advertisement on NBC, Fox Kids, Kids' WB, Nickelodeon and Cartoon Network during children's programming. On March 7, 1998, Nintendo pre-launched the game in Lizard Lick, North Carolina; a town of 1,300 residents. The event featured tongue-themed contests for children, and video terminals that let people try out the game. While Yoshi's Story was originally scheduled for a release by March 9, 1998, it was postponed due to El Niño storms. It was released the following day, on March 10, 1998.

An article in Financial Times said that the late release, an inadequate supply, and distribution errors had led to poor sales for Yoshi's Story in the U.S. Within a month, the game was being discounted by more than 50%. Even so, Yoshi's Story became a Player's Choice game on August 23, 1998. PC Data, which tracked sales in the United States, reported that the game sold 679,219 units and earned $32.6 million in revenues by the end of 1998. This made it the country's eighth-best-selling Nintendo 64 release of the year. According to The NPD Group, Yoshi's Story was the 16th best selling video game in the U.S. in 1998.

== Reception ==
Reception

Aggregate scores
| Aggregator | Score |
|---|---|
| GameRankings | 60% |
| Metacritic | 65/100 |

Review scores
| Publication | Score |
|---|---|
| AllGame | 2.5/5 |
| Edge | 7/10 |
| Electronic Gaming Monthly | 6/10, 6/10, 7.5/10, 7/10 |
| Famitsu | 8/10, 9/10, 8/10, 7/10 |
| Game Informer | 8.5/10 |
| GameSpot | 5.3/10 |
| IGN | 7/10 |
| N64 Magazine | 86% (JP); 86% (UK) |
| Next Generation | 2/5 |

Yoshi's Story holds a 65 out of 100 rating on Metacritic based on eight reviews, indicating "Mixed or average reviews". Upon its initial release, critics praised the game's music, ease of play, and graphics, particularly the seamless integration of rendered objects with hand-drawn art. A reviewer in Famitsu said just seeing the Yoshi's move made them happy, while another said the fairy-tale nature of the graphics was a highlight. However, they also found the game to be simplistic, particularly as compared to its predecessor Yoshi's Island, and considered it much too short and easy to offer good value. John Ricciardi of Electronic Gaming Monthly wrote that "Fans of the original Yoshi's Island (one of the best platformers of all time) are going to be shaking their heads at the simplicity of this sequel.", and his co-reviewer Crispin Boyer said, "Nintendo got nearly everything right – the control, graphics, music and sound effects are all brilliant. Now why aren't there enough levels, bosses and secrets to keep me busy longer than a weekend?" Edge likewise highlighted the game's pre-rendered graphics for their variety of colors and scenery, but criticized the gameplay for being too easy and lacking challenge. Critics generally regarded the changes made to the international version to be positive but insufficient to alleviate the game's brevity and feeble challenge.

Most reviews acknowledged that young children, who the game was clearly targeted towards, would probably love the game. Joe Fielder of GameSpot noted that Yoshi's Story "was obviously designed so that younger players could play through quickly and feel some sense of accomplishment", and called it "good for a rental at best." Amongst the few more positive reviews, Game Informer praised its unusual art direction, unique progression system, and numerous hidden secrets. Next Generation stated that "Yoshi's Story could have been a renaissance for side-scrollers. Instead, it sounds more like a death knell."

GamePro considered the game's amazing graphics to be its one universal appeal, stating that younger players would be enthralled with Yoshi's Story but older players should avoid it. They also remarked that the analog control is overly sensitive and frustrating, and that the game should have had an option to use the N64 controller's D-pad. Peer Schneider of IGN, by contrast, said that the analog control was the one gameplay element in which Yoshi's Story made any advance over Yoshi's Island, praising its ease of use. He summed up his mixed feelings about the game: "At its best, the level design is right up there with the original Mario games and it impresses with innovative control, great graphics and original levels. But at other times, Yoshi is an unchallenging romp through levels that reek of recycled game ideas, derivative layout, and clueless enemies."

On September 17, 2007, Nintendo made the initial release of Yoshi's Story on the Wii's Virtual Console service. Reviews for the VC release were unenthusiastic. GameSpot gave the VC download a 4.0 out of 10, noting that "Like many of the other Nintendo 64 games that have made the jump to the Wii's Virtual Console service, Yoshi's Story underwent a modest graphical upgrade that has replaced the formerly blurry textures with crisp objects and has significantly reduced the instances of slowdown during boss battles. The trade-off is that rumble support was dropped, just like the other N64 releases." As with their review of the original release, they lambasted the lack of interesting designs and challenge. In IGN editor Lucas M. Thomas's review for the VC release, he gave it a 6.0 out of 10, saying that "It's nonsensical. And worse, unengaging." Repeating the criticisms of short length and lack of challenge from contemporary reviews, Thomas said that in retrospect Yoshi's Story was the beginning of Yoshi's fall from favor, and that it stood up poorly against recent Yoshi games such as Yoshi's Island DS.

In 2020, Screen Rant praised the game's artistic style, commenting that "The crisp 2D layout and colorful storybook vibe give it a timeless quality".
