= Dance Dance Revolution: Mario Mix =

2005 video game

- North American cover art
- Developer: Konami
- Publisher: Nintendo
- Director: Yukihiro Yamazaki
- Producers: Hitoshi Yamagami; Hirotaka Ishikawa
- Composer: U1-Asami
- Series: Mario; Dance Dance Revolution
- Platform: GameCube
- Release: JP: July 14, 2005; NA: October 24, 2005; EU: October 28, 2005; AU: November 24, 2005
- Genres: Music, exergaming
- Mode: Single-player

Dance Dance Revolution: Mario Mix, known in Europe and Australia as Dancing Stage Mario Mix, (Note: Known in Japan as Dance Dance Revolution with Mario (Japanese: ダンスダンスレボリューション ウィズ マリオ, Hepburn: Dansu Dansu Reboryūshon Uizu Mario)) is a 2005 music video game developed by Konami and published by Nintendo for the GameCube. It is the first Dance Dance Revolution game to be released on a Nintendo video game console outside Japan. The game was first announced in January 2005, and was released later that year in Japan on July 14, North America on October 24, Europe on October 28, and Australia on November 24.

Dance Dance Revolution: Mario Mix predominantly features characters, music, and locations from the Mario franchise. The game was bundled with a dance pad controller.

The game received average reviews, with praise towards its blending of Dance Dance Revolution and Mario elements, music, and accessibility, but criticism towards its low difficulty level compared to other Dance Dance Revolution games and short story mode length.

== Gameplay ==
Dance Dance Revolution: Mario Mix follows the gameplay formula established in all prior Dance Dance Revolution games. The game features several gameplay modes: Story Mode takes the player through a linear progression of tracks, framed as a story of Mario and Luigi traveling the Mushroom Kingdom to retrieve the missing Music Keys. Once a track has been cleared in Story Mode, it becomes available for play in Free Mode, which allows up to two players to dance simultaneously. The player can purchase items at Lakitu's shop during Story Mode that can be used to assist them if they are struggling. Some stages feature "Mush Mode" rules, which replace the traditional arrows with Mario enemies that feature unique mechanics. Special minigames will also appear during Story Mode, providing alternate gameplay styles such as jumping up on a flagpole or hitting Goombas that emerge from pipes with a hammer. Like the tracks, these mini-games will be unlocked for free play in Mini-Game Mode once they have been cleared in Story Mode. Once the player completes Story Mode for the first time, they will unlock Story Mode EX, which features a slightly altered selection of songs. Additional difficulty levels can also be unlocked.

The game was packaged with a Mario-themed dance pad, though the game also supports traditional GameCube controllers. Standalone dance pads were sold exclusively through Nintendo's online store.

== Plot ==
In Truffle Towers, Waluigi attempts to steal the four Music Keys, which contain the power of music and can grant wishes. However, when opens their chamber door, three of the Music Keys scatter across the Mushroom Kingdom, leaving him with only one. Seeing the keys scatter, Toad rushes to tell Mario or Luigi, depending on the player's choice, who agrees to help retrieve the missing Music Keys. The player character accompanies Toad across the Mushroom Kingdom on the S.S. Brass, a flying airship made from musical instruments. They retrieve each of the Music Keys: one from Waluigi in Truffle Towers, one from a Big Blooper inside a whirlpool, one from Wario's carnival, and one from a giant Freezie atop a snowy mountain.

After collecting the four Music Keys, Toad and the player return to Truffle Towers to restore them. They are intercepted by Bowser, who steals the keys and escapes. The player character pursues Bowser to his castle, where he challenges them to a dance-off. The player defeats Bowser, who admits he only wanted the power of the Music Keys to fix his tone deafness. Feeling sorry for Bowser, the player character uses the keys to turn the area around Bowser's Castle into a green field. Toad realizes the keys were always meant to be used to instill people's souls with music and make the world happier, and everyone dances together.

== Music ==
Dance Dance Revolution: Mario Mix features 29 music tracks, including remixes of both tracks from previous Mario titles and public domain classical music. Only one track is initially available, while the remainder are unlocked by clearing them in Story Mode and Story Mode EX, or by purchasing them from Lakitu's shop. The following table lists the tracks in the order they appear in Free Play.

Music tracks in Dance Dance Revolution: Mario Mix
Title (English)	Stage	Game	Original song	Original composer	Japanese title
Here We Go!	1-1	Super Mario Bros.	Ground Theme	Koji Kondo	ヒア・ウィ・ゴー (Hia Wi Gō)
Underground Mozart	1-2	Mario Bros.	Eine Kleine Nachtmusik	Wolfgang Amadeus Mozart	土管の中のモーツァルト (Dokan no Naka no Mōtsaruto)
Pipe Pop (Note: Replaces the previous song in Story Mode EX)	1-2EX		Turkish March	Wolfgang Amadeus Mozart	パペットダンス (Papetto Dansu)
Garden Boogie	1-3		Carmen	Georges Bizet	パラパラカルメン (Parapara Karumen)
Destruction Dance	1-4	Wrecking Crew	Bonus Stage	Hirokazu Tanaka	月夜にぶちこわせ (Tsukiyo ni Buchikowase)
Jump! Jump! Jump!	2-1	Super Mario Bros. 3	Athletic Theme	Koji Kondo	ジャンプ！ジャンプ！ジャンプ！ (Janpu! Janpu! Janpu!)
Fishing Frenzy	2-2	Yoshi's Cookie	Csikos Post	Hermann Necke	みんなでパーティタイム (Minna de Pāti Taimu)
Pirate Dance	2-2EX	Super Mario World	Athletic Theme	Koji Kondo	転がるコインのように (Korogaru Koin no Yō ni)
In the Whirlpool	2-3		Pomp and Circumstance	Edward Elgar	風のかなたに (Kaze no Kanata ni)
Step by Step	2-3EX	Super Mario World	Bonus/Switch Palace Level Theme	Koji Kondo	ステップ・バイ・ステップ (Suteppu Bai Suteppu)
Blooper Bop	2-4	Super Mario Bros.	Underwater	Koji Kondo	泳げ四分音符 (Oyoge Shibun Onpu)
Hammer Dance	3-1	Super Mario Bros. 3	Overworld Theme	Koji Kondo	クエ・テ・バヤ・マリオ (Kue Te Baya Mario)
Rollercoasting	3-2	Mario Kart: Double Dash	Mario/Luigi/Yoshi Circuit Theme	Shinobu Tanaka	スーパーマシーン (Sūpā Mashīn)
Boo Boogie	3-3	Super Mario Bros. 2	Main Theme	Koji Kondo	ほっぴンちょっぴン (Hoppin Choppin)
Moustache, Barrel, and Gorilla	3-3EX	Donkey Kong	Various	Yukio Kaneoka	ヒゲとタルとゴリラ (Hige to Taru to Gorira)
Starring Wario!	3-4	Wario World	Greenhorn Forest	Minako Hamano	オレ様がスターだ! (Ore-sama ga Sutā da!)
Frozen Pipes	4-1		Old Folks at Home	Stephen Collins Foster	気分はハイ・ホー (Kibun wa Hai Hō)
Cabin Fever	4-2	Mario Party 5	Toy Dream Theme	Aya Tanaka	マリオのカーニバル (Mario no Kānibaru)
Ms. Mowz's Song	4-2EX	Paper Mario: The Thousand-Year Door	Theme of Ms. Mowz; X-Naut Fortress	Yuka Tsujiyoko	チューチューテクノ (Chū Chū Tekuno)
Deep Freeze	4-3	Dr. Mario	Fever	Hirokazu Tanaka	ハッピーハッピーダンス (Happī Happī Dansu)
Rendezvous on Ice	4-4	Antarctic Adventure	Les Pâtineurs	Emile Waldteufel	氷の上でランデブー (Kōri no Ue de Randebū)
Midnight Drive	4-4EX	Mario Kart 64	Mario Kart 64 Theme	Kenta Nagata	真夜中のドライブ (Mayonaka no Doraibu)
Always Smiling	5-1		Tritsch-Tratsch-Polka	Johann Strauss II	きっと笑顔がイチバンさ (Kitto Egao ga Ichiban sa)
Bowser's Castle	5-2	Mario Kart: Double Dash	Bowser's Castle	Shinobu Tanaka/Kenta Nagata	ワガハイはボスである! (Wagahai wa Bosu de Aru!)
Up, Down, Left, Right		Mario Paint	Twinkle, Twinkle, Little Star	Anonymous	ゼン・ゴ・サ・ユウ (Zen Go Sa Yū)
Choir on the Green			Ah, Lovely Meadow	Anonymous	緑の上の大合唱 (Midori no Ue no Daigasshō)
Hop, Mario!		Super Mario World	Opening	Koji Kondo	ホップステップマリオ (Hoppu Suteppu Mario)
Where's the Exit?		Super Mario Bros.	Underground	Koji Kondo	出口はどこだ!? (Deguchi wa Doko da!?)
Piroli		Famicom Disk System	BIOS	Hirokazu Tanaka	ピ・ロ・リ (Pi Ro Ri)

== Reception ==
Reception

Aggregate scores
Aggregator	Score
GameRankings	71.70%
Metacritic	69/100

Review scores
Publication	Score
Game Informer	5.25/10
GameSpot	7/10
GameSpy	3/5
IGN	8/10
NGC Magazine	77%
Nintendo World Report	8/10

Dance Dance Revolution: Mario Mix received "mixed or average" reviews, according to review aggregator website Metacritic. It gained a aggregate critical score of 71.70% on GameRankings.

GameSpot gave the game a 7 out of 10 and wrote "With a short story mode that serves as a fun, linear introduction to sequential stomping, Mario Mix is suitable for a child, or for an uncoordinated friend." IGN gave the game an 8 out of 10, saying, "Mario and friends bust some moves in Konami's updated take on an old dance formula." Phil Theobald of GameSpy, gave the game three out of five stars, saying "Mario and Luigi get out on the dance floor to save the Mushroom Kingdom. Come on, it's time to go do the Mario!"

During the 9th Annual Interactive Achievement Awards, DDR: Mario Mix received a nomination for "Family Game of the Year", which was ultimately awarded to Guitar Hero.
