= Classic series =

The term Classic series may refer to any list of media in a franchise considered "classic". Individual articles on entities referred to as "Classic series":

== Vehicle lines ==
- The Classic series of Boeing 737 airplanes
- The Classic series of Royal Enfield motorcycles
- The Classic series of guitar amplifiers by Peavey Electronics
- The AC30 Custom Classic series of guitar amplifiers by Vox

== Labels ==
- The budget line rereleases of NES games called Classic Series
- The ports of NES games to the Game Boy Advance called Classic NES Series

== Events ==
- The Bay Classic Series road cycling race
