= Csikós Post =

Composition by Hermann Necke

Csikós Post (Hungarian: [ˈt͡ʃikoːʃ ˈpoʃt]) is a galop in the key of E minor by the German composer Hermann Necke (1850–1912). Csikós is a Hungarian mounted horse-herdsman; Hungarian Post is an acrobatic riding performance where the rider stands on the back of two horses and drives three more horses in front (pickaxe arrangement).

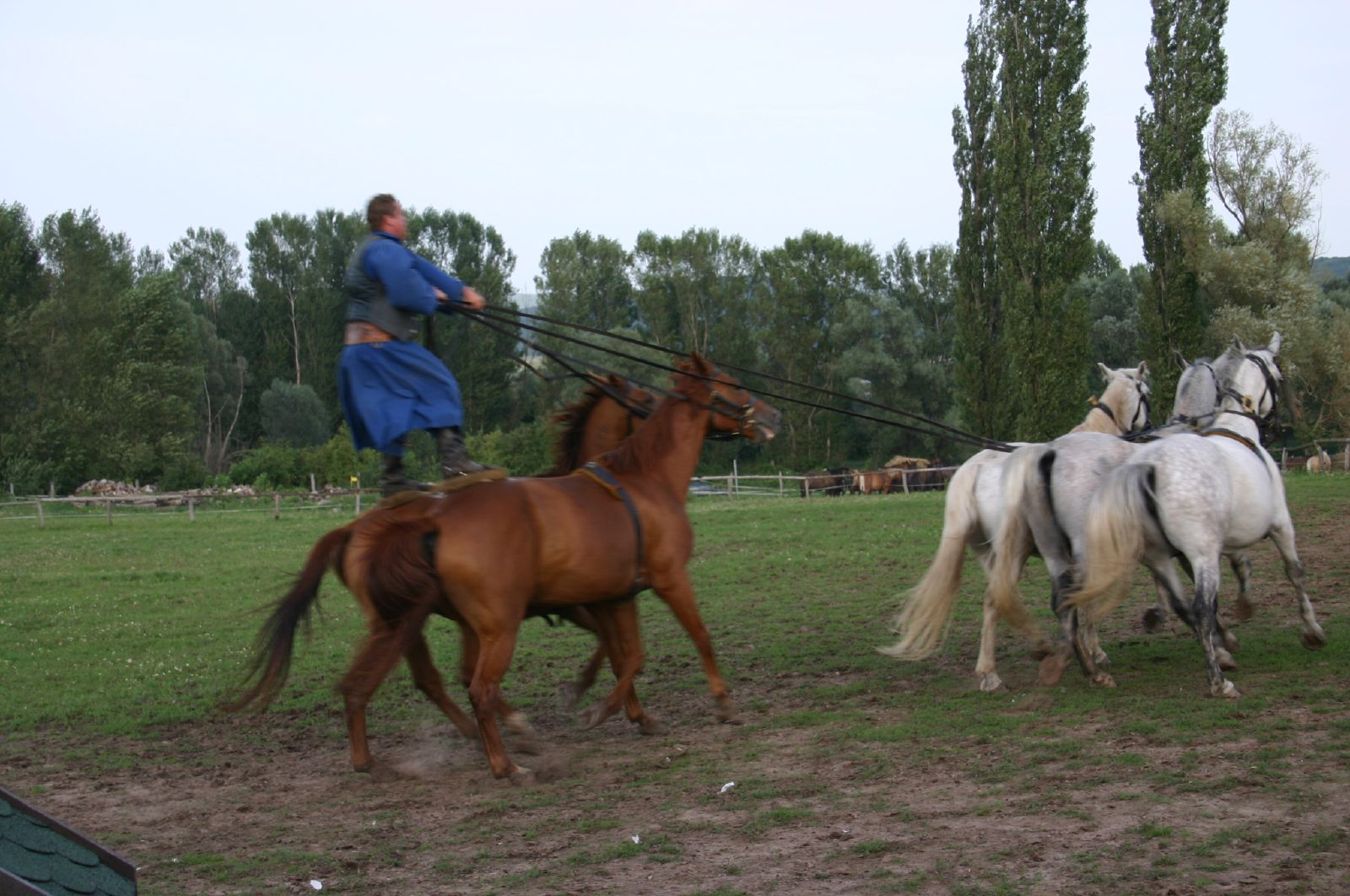
Hungarian Post riding performance

The melodic line in which the piece transitions to C major is a variation on a melody from Franz Liszt's Hungarian Rhapsody No. 2.

Hermann Necke

The piece has been used repeatedly in video games including Yoshi's Cookie (as Action Type B for the SNES version and Versus Type C for the NES and Game Boy versions), Mario & Sonic at the London 2012 Olympic Games, Dance Dance Revolution Mario Mix (as Fishing Frenzy), Nintendogs + Cats (used as a music record which could be bought at the store), Hamtaro: Ham-Hams Unite! (as Postman's Rush), and Daigasso! Band Brothers (as Athletic Medley). It is also present in the music games O2Jam and pop'n music FEVER! and was also used as background music in the Family Computer game Downtown Nekketsu Kōshinkyoku and in the opening sequence of its sequel Bikkuri Nekketsu Shin Kiroku! (released in North America as Crash 'n the Boys: Street Challenge) and as a piece in the popular piano game, Piano Tiles. It has also been used in the theme of The Battle Cats.

The piece has been remixed in Sexy Parodius (as Song Speed Bath) and by the group BanYa for the Pump It Up series. A version with parody lyrics was included in the 2001 Hong Kong animated movie My Life as McDull.
