= Super Mario Advance =

2001 video game

- North American cover art
- Developer: Nintendo R&D2
- Publisher: Nintendo
- Director: Toshiaki Suzuki
- Producer: Shigeru Miyamoto
- Designers: Yasuhisa Yamamura; Shigeyuki Asuke
- Artist: Hiroyuki Kimura
- Series: Super Mario
- Platform: Game Boy Advance
- Release: JP: March 21, 2001; NA: June 11, 2001; EU: June 22, 2001; CN: June 2004
- Genre: Platform
- Modes: Single player, multiplayer

Super Mario Advance (Note: Japanese: スーパーマリオアドバンス, Hepburn: Sūpā Mario Adobansu) is a 2001 platform game developed and published by Nintendo as a launch title for the Game Boy Advance (GBA). It is an enhanced remake of the NES video game Super Mario Bros. 2 (1988), using the graphical style of Super Mario All-Stars (1993). Players control Mario, Luigi, Peach, or Toad as they travel through the seven worlds of Subcon to save the kingdom from the evil toad Wart. It contains several additions, including voice clips for all playable characters, giant renditions of objects, and a multiplayer mode based on the original Mario Bros. arcade game.

Super Mario Advance began development in response to the success of Super Mario Bros. Deluxe (1999), a port of Super Mario Bros. released for the Game Boy Color. It was first revealed at a Japanese retail conference in January 2001, then released worldwide throughout the year; it was also released in China in June 2004. Super Mario Advance was well-received by critics upon release for its presentation and gameplay enhancements, though some felt it offered less than Deluxe. It was also a major commercial success, selling 5.5 million copies worldwide, making it one of the best-selling Game Boy Advance games. Nintendo would develop three more games with the Super Mario Advance moniker, being ports of Super Mario World, Yoshi's Island, and Super Mario Bros. 3, which themselves released to similar critical and commercial success and would lead to the development of New Super Mario Bros. (2006).

== Gameplay ==
The gameplay is similar to the original version of Super Mario Bros. 2 for the Nintendo Entertainment System. Before each stage, the player chooses one of four protagonists: Mario, Luigi, Toad, and Princess Peach. All four characters can run, jump, and climb ladders or vines, but each character possesses a unique advantage that causes them to be controlled differently. For example, Mario has balanced speed, jumping height, and strength; Luigi can jump the highest, but moves slightly slower and has weaker strength; Princess Peach can float because of her dress but has the lowest speed and strength; Toad has the highest speed and strength, which allows him to pick up items quickly, but jumps the lowest. Players pick up enemies and throw them rather than jumping on them like most traditional Mario games. The same applies for items. Players can pick up potions which allow them to travel to Subspace, where they can pick up a mushroom for extra health and coins which allow them to use the bonus machine at the end of the level for extra lives.

The game features several changes to take advantage of the Game Boy Advance hardware. Several sprites having scaling effects applied such as the throwable fruit, which can vary in size, and digitized voice acting is included with Charles Martinet and Jen Taylor reprising their roles as the voices of Mario/Luigi and Toad/Peach respectively. Present throughout the stages are five "Ace Coins" that reward an extra life. A "Yoshi Challenge" is unlocked upon beating the game in which players find Yoshi Eggs throughout the levels, similar to Challenge Mode in Super Mario Bros. Deluxe. Players are also able to save their progress.

A second mode is a remake of Mario Bros., which allows for 1-4 player simultaneous multiplayer. In this mode, gameplay takes place on a single screen, and the goal is to defeat every enemy that comes out of six pipes. These enemies are defeated by hitting the floor from below to flip them over; the player then must go to its level and touch it before it can flip back over. If it flips over, it turns blue and moves faster. In multiplayer, the players compete to defeat enemies and can inconvenience each other. Each player has only so many lives; once depleted, they lose.

== Development and release ==
Development on Super Mario Advance started after the release of Super Mario Bros. Deluxe, released for the Game Boy Color in 1999; Deluxe was an enhanced port of the original Super Mario Bros. with added features and enhanced visuals, and had been a commercial success with 2.8 million units sold in the United States. While graphically based on the Super Mario All-Stars version of Super Mario Bros. 2, it is not a port, rather it was programmed from the ground up. Due to the Game Boy Advance not having a backlight, all of the graphics had their brightness increased, and the level design was also altered to account for the smaller screen resolution. The Mario Bros. remake was originally a separate project at Nintendo before the two projects were merged. Designer Takashi Tezuka wanted to add new, more complex elements, but opted not to out of worry that these elements would be too complicated with four players.

Super Mario Advance was revealed on January 13, 2001, at a Japanese retail conference under the tentative title Mario Advance. Released as a launch title in all regions, it first released in Japan on March 21, 2001; it was then released in North America on June 11, 2001, and in Europe on June 22, 2001. It was later released in China in June 2004, where the system was distributed under the iQue brand. On April 2, 2006, it was re-released in the United States under the Player's Choice label.

On July 16, 2014, Super Mario Advance was added to the Wii U Virtual Console in Japan, and in North America on November 6, 2014; it was released in Europe nearly two years later on March 10, 2016. On May 26, 2023, the first three Super Mario Advance games were added to the Nintendo Classics service for the Switch.

== Reception ==
Reception

Aggregate scores
Aggregator	Score
GameRankings	82%
Metacritic	84/100

Review scores
Publication	Score
Famitsu	27/40
GamePro	9/10
GameSpot	8.2/10
GameSpy	4.5/5
IGN	8/10
Jeuxvideo.com	15/20
Nintendo Life	7/10
Nintendo Power	3.5/5 (Note: Editors respectively rated the game 2.5, 4, 4, 3.5, and 3.)
Nintendo World Report	8.5/10

Upon release, Super Mario Advance was met with "generally favorable reviews" according to review aggregator website Metacritic; it holds an aggregate score of 84/100 based on 19 reviews.

The presentation was well-received. Marc Nix of IGN noted the extensive use of scaling and rotation effects, saying "Super Mario Advance still puts the GBA through its paces, with scaling characters, spinning characters, gigantazoidized characters... Nintendo did a job on the characters." He also praised the quality of the audio, though wished that it had more music. GameSpot shared a similar sentiment, praising the improved graphics and music, as did Nintendo Life in a retrospective. The voice clips, however, received a mixed response; IGN and GameSpot both found them charming, but admitted that players may get annoyed at them. It also received criticism for its perceived lack of extra content, unlike Super Mario Bros. Deluxe.

Super Mario Advance was a commercial success. In its debut week in Japan, it sold approximately 159,000 copies. In July 2001, Famitsu reported that the game had sold 592,897 copies in Japan, making it the fourth-highest selling game since the start of the year. In 2008, it received a "Gold" sales award from the Entertainment and Leisure Software Publishers Association (ELSPA), indicating sales of at least 200,000 copies in the United Kingdom. By 2021, Super Mario Advance had sold an estimated 5,570,000 units worldwide, making it the sixth best-selling Game Boy Advance game of all-time.

== Legacy ==
Following the success of the first game, Nintendo would release three more games under the Super Mario Advance; Super Mario Advance 2: Super Mario World released on December 14, 2001, Super Mario Advance 3: Yoshi's Island on September 23, 2002, and Super Mario Advance 4: Super Mario Bros. 3 on July 11, 2003. All three sequels were met with critical acclaim (Note: Metacritic scores of Super Mario Advance sequels: Super Mario Advance 2: Super Mario World: 92/100; Super Mario Advance 3: Yoshi's Island: 91/100; Super Mario Advance 4: Super Mario Bros. 3: 94/100) and are among the highest-selling Game Boy Advance games.

Nintendo would start development on a new Mario game for the Nintendo DS after releasing Advance 4, evolving into New Super Mario Bros. in 2006.
