= New Super Mario Bros. =

2006 video game

- North American box art
- Developer: Nintendo EAD
- Publisher: Nintendo
- Director: Shigeyuki Asuke
- Producer: Hiroyuki Kimura
- Programmers: Nobuhiko Sadamoto; Eiji Noto
- Artist: Masanao Arimoto
- Composers: Asuka Hayazaki; Hajime Wakai; Koji Kondo
- Series: Super Mario
- Platform: Nintendo DS
- Release: Template:Video game release May 15, 2006 May 25, 2006 June 8, 2006 June 30, 2006 March 8, 2007 July 9, 2006
- Genre: Platform
- Modes: Single-player, multiplayer

New Super Mario Bros. (Note: Japanese: New スーパーマリオブラザーズ, Hepburn: Nyū Sūpā Mario Burazāzu) is a 2006 platform game developed and published by Nintendo for the Nintendo DS. It was first released in May 2006 in North America and Japan, in Europe and Australia in June 2006, in South Korea in March 2007, and in China in July 2009. It is the first installment in the New Super Mario Bros. subseries of the Super Mario series and the first side-scrolling Super Mario game since Yoshi's Island (1995). It follows Mario as he fights his way through Bowser's henchmen to rescue Princess Peach. Mario has access to an upgraded moveset and several old and new power-ups that help him complete his quest, including the Super Mushroom, the Fire Flower, and the Super Star, each giving him unique abilities. While traveling through eight worlds with more than 80 levels, Mario has to defeat Bowser Jr. and Bowser before saving Princess Peach.

New Super Mario Bros. released with critical and commercial success, with many considering it as the main contributor in the revival of the 2D platforming genre. Praise went towards the game's improvements and introductions made to the Mario franchise, level design, faithfulness to older Mario games, and its graphics and audio; while minor criticism was targeted at its low difficulty level and lingering similarities to previous games. It received numerous awards and was called one of the best games available for the Nintendo DS by many critics, with some further calling it one of the best side-scrolling Super Mario titles. It sold over 30 million copies globally, making it the best-selling game for the Nintendo DS and one of the best-selling video games of all time. The game's success led to a line of sequels and follow-ups, starting with New Super Mario Bros. Wii (2009).

== Gameplay ==
Mario powered up by the Mega Mushroom, which grows him to an enormous size for a short period of time, allowing him to destroy terrain such as pipes and blocks. Mario and surrounding objects are seen with a 2.5D effect.

New Super Mario Bros. is a side-scrolling video game. While the game is seen in 2D, most of the characters and objects are 3D polygonal renderings on 2D backgrounds, resulting in a 2.5D effect that visually simulates 3D computer graphics. The player can play as either Mario, or his younger brother, Luigi. Similar to previous Mario games, Mario and Luigi can jump, crouch, collect coins, stomp on enemies, and break open blocks. Moves from 3D Mario games appear for the first time in 2D Mario games in New Super Mario Bros., including the ground pound, triple jump, and wall jump. Enemies from previous games, such as Boos, are also reintroduced, while various other new enemies are introduced.

Between eight and twelve levels are available in each of the eight worlds in New Super Mario Bros., which are shown on the Nintendo DS's bottom touch screen while the player is viewing the world map in the game. The map of the currently selected world appears on the top screen, which is used to navigate between the world's levels. The goal of each level is to reach a black flag at the end of the level. At the end of each world, a different boss must be defeated before proceeding to the next world. There are six power-ups available in New Super Mario Bros.; the game allows the player to store an extra power-up when they are already using one, a feature carried over from Super Mario World. Three power-ups from Super Mario Bros. return in the game: the Super Mushroom makes Mario grow in size, the Fire Flower lets Mario throw fireballs, and the Starman makes Mario temporarily invincible. Three more power-ups are introduced in New Super Mario Bros.: the Blue Koopa Shell lets Mario withdraw into a shell to protect himself and perform a "shell dash" attack. He also swims faster when in this form. The Mega Mushroom grows Mario to an incredible size, where he can destroy everything in his path, and the Mini-Mushroom causes Mario to shrink, allowing him to enter tiny passageways. Mini Mario is so light that he can run on water and jump extremely high.

The multiplayer mode in New Super Mario Bros. features two players against each other as they play as Mario and Luigi in one of five stages, in which they try to be the first to obtain a preset number of stars. Both players can attack each other in an attempt to steal the other player's stars. Jumping on the opponent's character will make them lose one star while performing a ground pound will lose them three. In addition, some minigames previously available in Super Mario 64 DS have returned with 3D graphics and now offer multiplayer options for added replay value. The minigames are divided into four categories: Action, Puzzle, Table and Variety. New Super Mario Bros. features eighteen minigames for single players and ten minigames for multiple players.

== Plot ==
Mario/Luigi and Princess Peach are walking together near the Mushroom Kingdom, when all of a sudden, they notice dark gray clouds appearing over Princess Peach's castle, striking lightning down onto it. As Mario/Luigi runs towards the castle to investigate, Bowser Jr. sneaks up on Princess Peach from behind and kidnaps her, prompting Mario/Luigi to chase Bowser Jr. to save Peach. In one of Bowser's castles, Mario/Luigi faces Bowser Jr. on a bridge above a pit filled with lava as he leaves Mario/Luigi to fight Bowser. Mario/Luigi activate a button, causing the bridge to collapse and Bowser to fall into the pit filled with lava below him. The lava burns off Bowser's skin and flesh, leaving an undead skeleton and introducing Dry Bowser. Later, in one of Bowser's castles, Mario/Luigi face Bowser Jr. on a bridge above a deep pit as he leaves Mario/Luigi to fight Dry Bowser. They activate a button, causing the bridge to collapse and Dry Bowser to fall into the deep pit below him and break. Bowser Jr. then retreats to Bowser's main castle, where Mario/Luigi faces Bowser Jr. on a bridge above a deep pit as Princess Peach is seen in a cage in the air. Bowser Jr. then puts Bowser's destroyed skeleton into a cauldron, causing Bowser to turn back into his original state and making him more powerful. Mario/Luigi then defeats Bowser Jr. and activates a button, causing the bridge to collapse and Bowser to fall into the deep pit below him. Princess Peach is then freed, and she kisses Mario/Luigi on the cheek. In the post-credits scene, Bowser Jr. is seen dragging Bowser, who is unconscious, by his tail. Bowser Jr. then looks at the screen and growls, breaking the fourth wall, and continues dragging his father.

== Development ==
The idea of a new side-scrolling Super Mario title for the Nintendo DS was first conceived in late 2003, shortly after the release of Super Mario Advance 4. People wondered if there would be a fifth entry, but the development team led by series producer Takashi Tezuka and Super Mario Advance series director Hiroyuki Kimura decided to make a completely new Super Mario title during development of the Nintendo DS, while taking inspiration from the series. Kimura would serve as the producer of New Super Mario Bros. while Tezuka would be its general producer. Shigeru Miyamoto was involved with the game as its supervisor, overseeing its development. New Super Mario Bros. was first showcased alongside the reveal of the Nintendo DS at E3 2004. The game was not playable at the event, with the press only providing information from a fact sheet, b-roll footage and screenshots. The footage was distributed widely online during the event, in which the game–at this point–was nothing more but a tech demo to showcase potential gameplay scenarios.

Early in the game's development, the developers planned not to use voice acting for the game to stay more true to the spirit of Super Mario Bros.; however, voice acting was eventually embraced by the developers, who decided that it would positively serve the game. Although voice acting was used in earlier 2D Mario remakes, New Super Mario Bros. is the first original 2D Mario game to use voice acting. Charles Martinet returned to voice Mario and Luigi. The team also set a goal to implement more engaging and functional ways of using 3D models in a 2D platformer. The usage of 3D models was not only seen as a natural change, but also as a significant evolution when the game was released. New Super Mario Bros. features original music composed by Asuka Ohta and Hajime Wakai under the direction of the Super Mario Bros. series composer, Koji Kondo, who also created the "Aboveground BGM", the main theme for regular levels. The game's music dictates gameplay; enemies jump and dance in time to the music. Predicting enemy movements, players can time their jumps with enemy movements to reach otherwise inaccessible areas.

New Super Mario Bros. is the first original 2D platform game to feature Mario since Super Mario Land 2: 6 Golden Coins on the Game Boy in 1992. New Super Mario Bros. was available for play at E3 in 2005. The game's designers were given much more freedom with designs in New Super Mario Bros. compared to previous 2D Mario games. Characters, enemies, and objects could now be created with much more detailed animations, without requiring that they would be designed by hand. To provide visual cues, the developers made the game's camera more dynamic; it zooms in and out of action depending on the situation to provide focus where necessary.

New Super Mario Bros. was later covered in the 883rd issue of Weekly Famitsu–dated to early November 2005–which included an interview with Takashi Tezuka. As described in said interview, the game's multiplayer mode would've had coop features, but the primary focus was making most of this mode competitive, as it was the most fun. The winner of each round would've been decided by a number of factors, including which player hit the flagpole first, though the interview doesn't elaborate. The team was also planning minigames similar to Super Mario 64 DS. Physics play an important role in New Super Mario Bros.'s improved game mechanics. Without the rigid restrictions of tile-based sprites and backgrounds, the designers were free to explore new gameplay mechanics. Mario can swing on ropes, sidle on walls, and walk on wires that bend and stretch under his weight. The environment likewise introduces mechanics such as deforming terrain, giant 3D obstacles, and fully rotating environments. Mario's moveset is also upgraded with the addition of the Ground Pound, Wall Jump, and Triple Jump from Super Mario 64 alongside other newly added moves.

Nintendo announced on January 21, 2006, that New Super Mario Bros. would launch for the Nintendo DS on May 7, 2006. The game's new power-ups were also introduced at the same time, including the Blue Koopa Shell and the Mega Mushroom. Nintendo further mentioned that the game would be played in 2D, but use 3D models to create a 2.5D look and feel. The May 7 release was later delayed towards May 21, 2006, but the game's release date was eventually only pushed back slightly to May 15 of that year; Nintendo also planned to release the game around the same time that the Nintendo DS Lite launched, on June 11, 2006.

== Release ==
New Super Mario Bros. was released by Nintendo in North America on May 15, 2006, in Japan on May 25, 2006, and in Europe on June 30, 2006. Nintendo did not specify why it chose to delay the game's release in its home market of Japan by ten days, but GameSpot noted that "it stands to reason that the company simply wants a few more days to build inventory." In Japan, over 480,000 units of New Super Mario Bros. were sold on the day it was released and 900,000 copies in the first four days. At the time, it was the best-selling debut for a Nintendo DS game in Japan, which was then surpassed by Pokémon Diamond and Pearl. It is Japan's 26th best-selling game in 2008. In the United States, 500,000 copies of New Super Mario Bros. were sold in the first 35 days, and one million copies were sold twelve weeks after its release. Worldwide sales have steadily increased throughout the years, with five million copies by April 2008, eighteen million by March 2009, and 30.8 million by March 2016, making it the best-selling game for the Nintendo DS and one of the best-selling video games of all time.

== Reception ==
Reception

Aggregate scores
Aggregator	Score
GameRankings	89.07%
Metacritic	89/100

Review scores
Publication	Score
1Up.com	B+
Computer and Video Games	9/10
Edge	8/10
Eurogamer	9/10
Game Informer	9.25/10
GamePro	4.5/5
GameRevolution	B+
GameSpot	9/10
GameSpy	5/5
GamesRadar+	4.5/5
GameZone	9.3/10
IGN	9.5/10
Nintendo Life	9/10
X-Play	4/5
The A.V. Club	A−

The game received highly positive reviews from critics, with many calling New Super Mario Bros. one of the best games for the Nintendo DS and some further calling it one of the best side-scrolling Super Mario titles. Its high praise and success is what many consider to be a driving point towards the rebirth of 2D side-scroller platformers, which saw a decline in popularity after the development of 3D graphics for platformer games in the mid-1990s. While some games such as the Rayman series, Castlevania: Symphony of the Night, Metroid Fusion, Oddworld, and Heart of Darkness kept their style alive, 3D games were largely seen as a lasting and almost necessary evolution of the medium, while 2D games were increasingly dismissed as technologically inferior and outdated. IGN highlighted the importance New Super Mario Bros. had by remarking how "Rising expectations" had caused the "classic sidescrolling formula" to be "relegated to "classic" status", with only re-releases and ports of existing games and, occasionally, spin-off franchises. They stated that a new official Super Mario would have to be something special for it to exist on a current Nintendo system, and noted that the release of New Super Mario Bros. was "so significant" and "absolutely something special".

Critics praised the game’s core gameplay and level design, commending the significant evolution of the gameplay from prior games and the creativity in its level design. Craig Harris of IGN lauded the game, stating that it "marks a brilliant return to Mario's side-scrolling environments, with a look, feel, and play that feels unbelievably classic, with new elements that do a fantastic job advancing the design". He applauded the game’s gameplay and level design for having evolved similarly to how Yoshi’s Island had, considering that "A lot of what made Yoshi's Island so fantastic was how the designers used graphic capabilities to create and incorporate new gameplay elements into the mix. That's the same with New Super Mario Bros.-- the power of the Nintendo DS makes it possible for new elements like the deforming terrain, giant 3D enemies and obstacles, fully rotating environments, and countless other elements". Additionally, he praised the level design for its creativity and being "peppered with cool little subtleties". GameSpot praised the level design and the expansion of Mario’s moveset as "great", while also enjoying how it "takes advantage" of Mario's new moves and power-ups in key spots. GameZone believed that it was the "hot game" to purchase for any DS owner, noting its "huge exploration potential" and reinvention of the platform game genre. Tom Bramwell of Eurogamer stated, "I've done this sort of thing before hundreds of times across thousands of days in what feels like a dozen Mario games. I still love it."

The game’s extra modes also received praise from critics. The Computer and Video Games magazine was entertained by the "finely crafted slice of Mario", along with the extra minigames offered. IGN considered the Mario vs. Luigi multiplayer mode "fantastic" and deemed it a significant evolution from the Mario Bros. arcade game and its remake included in the Super Mario Advance series of ports. Harris called the extra minigames "pretty cool" and noted how while some reappeared from Super Mario 64 DS, most were new and commended how returning ones were given new multiplayer features and enhanced graphics. GamesRadar considered the game "a bargain", noting that it included "a completely solid solo game, a simple-but-exciting two-player, and then a collection of super-quick stylus games".

New Super Mario Bros.'s graphics and audio also received praise for their evolution from previous games by incorporating 3D models and striking a good balance of new and returning audio. GameSpot lauded the game's visual style by calling it "fantastic" and praised it "simultaneously reminding you of the older games while using polygonal graphics and effects very well, making the levels and characters all look really, really impressive", and additionally praised its music and sound effects for having "just enough old or remixed Mario music and sound effects in there to remind you of the older games" and "just enough newer-sounding stuff". Computer and Video Games believed that the audio was very good for a Nintendo DS game, predicting that "it'd still scare the pants off the hard-of-hearing". Though New Super Mario Bros. is a 2D game, GameSpy still found that the 2D and 3D elements blended together perfectly in the game.

Several reviewers drew comparisons between New Super Mario Bros. and their favorite Mario games. Although some liked older Mario games better, and the game's lower difficulty compared to older Mario games drew some minor criticism, reviewers were still widely pleased with the overall experience of the game; with many calling New Super Mario Bros. one of the best games for the Nintendo DS and some further calling it one of the best side-scrolling Super Mario titles. Even though Super Mario World and Super Mario Bros. 3 were considered the best 2D Mario games by GamePro's Mr. Marbles, he decided to add New Super Mario Bros. as his third favorite Mario game, which he admitted had much more replay value than the other two. Harris of IGN stated that it was possibly his new favorite platforming game, supplanting his previous, Yoshi's Island, due to how New Super Mario Bros. used its new graphic capabilities like it to create and incorporate a large variety of new gameplay elements. Additionally, he deemed that while the game wasn't difficult to complete, its challenge emerged when trying "to snag three large coins in each level" for full completion and noted how "many of the coins aren't easily snagged". The A.V. Club considered that "balance of challenge and ease almost never frustrates—for example, the game only gives you a save point after you've really earned it".

Though the game includes various new features such as a versus mode and new enemies and power-ups alongside other additions and improvements to the gameplay, GameRevolution disconcertedly asked the question, "Can Mario ever truly be new again?". The A.V. Club felt that while the game drew some inspiration from its predecessors, "It gets everything right from them" and praised its significant additions. Greg Sewart of X-Play, thought that the game did not live up to the standards set by its predecessors, but still considered the game the best side-scrolling video game available for the Nintendo DS. Nintendo Life felt that the game took everything great and fun from the previous Super Mario Bros. games, rolled it all together, and added new elements. Jeff Gerstmann of GameSpot thought that even if "experienced players might blow through the game quickly", New Super Mario Bros. regardless still was above all a "completely awesome" video game that was "absolutely necessary" to own; applauding how it had "the ability to recall the older games without leaning too heavily on its famous name" and pulled the series' classic 2D side-scrolling gameplay "without feeling contrived or like a needless nostalgia trip" while simultaneously evolving it. He commended the game’s balance of new and old elements by remarking that "While there's plenty of old memories referenced in this game, it is most definitely new", and concluded that the game "lives up to the legacy of the series quite well".

The game's overall experience pleased 1UP.com, which applauded Nintendo's ability to once again create an enjoyable, solid, and challenging portable experience. Nintendo Life considered the game "one of the best platformers we've seen released in years, not to mention a game easily worthy of the Super Mario Bros. name" and stated that it could be called "the best Nintendo DS game to date, and one that should have no trouble doing what its' [sic] predecessors did, and that's selling a lot of Nintendo game systems". GameSpot regarded the game as a "quality game" and lauded it as an "essential new classic".

New Super Mario Bros. received numerous awards and accolades. It was given Game of the Month awards from Game Informer and Electronic Gaming Monthly, and it received Editors's Choice Awards from IGN and GameSpot. The game was voted Best Handheld Game at the 2006 Spike Video Game Awards, Best Nintendo DS Game by GameSpot, and it won Best Platformer awards from X-Play and Nintendo Power. The game was awarded Choice Video Game at the 2006 Teen Choice Awards, and Nintendo Game of the Year at the 2006 Golden Joystick Award. During the 10th Annual Interactive Achievement Awards, New Super Mario Bros. received a nomination for "Handheld Game of the Year" by the Academy of Interactive Arts & Sciences.

In 2009, Official Nintendo Magazine remarked "Sure, it's a little easy at times and a bit short but with genius new power-ups and loads of retro nods, few games put a bigger smile on your face", placing the game 30th on a list of greatest Nintendo games.

In 2023, TheGamer rated New Super Mario Bros. the 4th best 2D Mario game, behind Super Mario World, Super Mario Bros. Wonder, and New Super Mario Bros. U's Deluxe port. They called the game "fabulous", noted how it is "the only one [of the New Super Mario Bros. series] to which the claim of 'new' is valid", and lauded it for "Brimming with content, fantastic platforming, and new additions" as well as extra minigames.

== Legacy ==
The critical and commercial success of New Super Mario Bros. led to it spawning a subseries of sequels, the eponymous New Super Mario Bros. series.

New Super Mario Bros. Wii, a successor to New Super Mario Bros., was released internationally for the Wii on November 12, 2009. It features similar gameplay to its predecessor, with several of the same power-ups returning as well as brand-new ones. The game is the first Super Mario game to feature cooperative gameplay for up to four people. A direct sequel, New Super Mario Bros. 2, was released for the Nintendo 3DS on July 28, 2012. New Super Mario Bros. U was released as a launch title for the Wii U on November 18, 2012. An expansion to the game titled New Super Luigi U was released as DLC on June 20, 2013, but was later rereleased as its own disc. An enhanced version of New Super Mario Bros. U, including New Super Luigi U, was released for the Nintendo Switch on January 11, 2019, under the name of New Super Mario Bros. U Deluxe. It features Toadette as a new playable character.

The subseries would be succeeded by Super Mario Bros. Wonder in 2023, whose developers stated that with it they sought to create "a foundation for future 2D Mario games" like the one New Super Mario Bros. created, and wanted to develop "a significant evolution" like it was when it was released as the first 2D Mario game to use 3D elements.

In 2026, outlets reflected on the impact and legacy of New Super Mario Bros. Nintendo Life stated that because of how following the release of its sequels there were "multiple 'New' games over the years" it "became sometimes difficult to appreciate just how big the game was at the time" but remarked that "it really felt 'New' back then" and "was special" for how it "blended the old and the new", "reintroduced the classic Mario formula", "kickstarted a whole new sub-series", and its "classic power-ups alongside shiny new ones" and "new movement abilities" which allowed "even more creative level designs". They concluded that "While many feel that the 'New' series got a bit samey over the years", the original regardless remained "an extremely fun and polished game", and they'll "always have a soft spot for the first 2.5D entry on DS". ComicBook.com determined that the game was a "fresh take on a side-scrolling adventure" and noted how it, in addition to revitalizing 2D Mario games, "helped bring back the side-scroller as a viable genre and set the stage for plenty of terrific modern classics" and went on to mention that its critical and commercial success "proved the genre could still be refined with modern touches and that older franchises still had a space in the gaming landscape". ComicBook concluded by remarking how it "underscored just how much potential was still in the then-forgotten side-scrolling genre" and "revitalize[d] an entire genre — and in the twenty years since, gaming has gotten a lot of great titles as a result".
