= Daigasso! Band Brothers =

2004 video game

- Japanese box art
- Developers: Nintendo R&D2; Nintendo SPD
- Publisher: Nintendo
- Directors: Masaru Nishita; Noriko Kitamura; Nobuo Matsumiya
- Producer: Shinya Takahashi
- Designers: Yasushi Matsubara; Naoko Okamoto
- Programmers: Yuichi Ozaki; Toshikazu Tomizawa; Shinji Kitahara
- Composers: Masami Yone; Akito Nakatsuka; Minako Hamano; Masaru Tajima; Toshiyuki Sudo
- Platform: Nintendo DS
- Release: JP: December 2, 2004
- Genre: Music
- Modes: Single-player, multiplayer

Daigasso! Band Brothers (Note: Japanese: 大合奏!バンドブラザーズ, Hepburn: Daigassō! Bando Burazāzu lit. "Grand Ensemble! Band Brothers") is a music video game published and developed by Nintendo for the Nintendo DS, a handheld game console. It was released in Japan on December 2, 2004, as a launch game for the Nintendo DS. The game features multiple songs, which include classical music, television themes, and video game music. The game is controlled using both the buttons on the DS as well as its touch screen in certain portions. It uses a variety of different instruments, which are combined selectively in order to compose a song. Besides the primary mode, players may play together, each one playing a different instrument in the song. Players may also compose their own songs. It was to be released in the United States as Jam with the Band, but was never released or formally cancelled. It has two sequels titled Jam with the Band, which was released in Japan in 2008 and in Europe in 2010, and 2013's Japan-exclusive Daigasso! Band Brothers P.

== Gameplay ==
The single-player game of Band Brothers includes 35 normal songs, plus three unlockable songs. These are divided into the categories J-Pop, World, TV (anime/tokusatsu), Classic, and Game (includes a variety of medleys from Nintendo titles such as Mario, Fire Emblem, and Zelda). Each song has a number of parts available for the player to play, usually ranging from 6 to 8, and each part will generally be a different instrument, but many songs have more than one part played by the same instrument.

In the Beginner mode, all notes are represented either by a D-Pad icon or a button icon, and any direction or face button, respectively, will automatically play the correct note. In Amateur mode, each of the eight buttons on the face of the Nintendo DS system corresponds to a musical note; there is also a drum set where each button, including the L and R buttons, plays a specific drum or cymbal. As many songs contain fast or difficult parts to play, they are covered in the Beginner and Amateur modes—when the cursor is about to move over them, the lower screen will change to the "touch" command; touching the bottom screen at this time causes the notes underneath the touch screen portion to be played automatically. These do not contribute to the player's score, but prevent high-speed sequences from being forced on the player early on, and activating them helps to keep the rhythm and flow of the song.

In Pro Mode, the player must hold down the L button while playing specified notes to raise them by a semitone, and hold down the R button at other notes to raise them by an octave; some notes combine both of these functions to raise a note an octave and a semitone. The player may also play a ↓+R note as X, as X represents the same note as ↓ an octave higher. In addition, the drum set sometimes requires the player to hit two notes at once, and the touch screen portions must be played manually; at this point, the game receives a drastic increase in difficulty and essentially turns the Nintendo DS into a musical instrument.

As a song progresses, the top screen scrolls through one bar at a time (one stretching across the screen horizontally, and the next few bars shown below it). A cursor moves to show where in the song the player currently is, and as the cursor moves over a note's "head", the aim is to press the button displayed on that head, and if necessary, hold it down until the end of the "tail". Some long notes will have a tail extending across multiple bars, and very short ones will have none at all. Successfully hit the buttons at the proper time will produce the desired tune, but hit it at the wrong time and the tune will sound discordant.

As in many music/rhythm-based games, every single note is given a title based on the accuracy, and the more accurate notes increase the score by more. These ranks are Best (perfect timing), Good (slightly too fast or slow), Bad (the note's head will not disappear; much too fast or slow), and Miss (the correct note was not played at all, or stopped before the end of the tail). At the end of a song, the score is calculated as a number out of 100.

In Free Play Mode, the player scrolls through the songs using up and down on the D-Pad and selects a part from the list using the touch screen. Listed with the instrument name will be a star difficulty level from 1 to 5. In Amateur and Pro modes (which are judged separately and toggled via a switch on the title screen), the player's score is recorded and appears next to the instrument of the song.

Progression through the game is done in the Recording Ticket mode, a single-player mode where the player must play three randomly selected songs, depending on the ticket level of the player; for example, a level three ticket will have the player randomly playing songs using instruments with a 3-star difficulty rating. The goal is to play the three songs and get a total score of 240/300, while making as few mistakes as possible; if the player makes too many mistakes, represented by a bomb and a burning fuse, then the game ends.

Beating the Recording Ticket Mode at the Beginner level, which only has 1 level, unlocks the Amateur mode; and beating all five levels of Amateur mode unlocks Professional mode. Beating the five levels of the Professional mode unlocks the Recording Ticket Gold Mode, a harder version of Professional Recording Ticket Mode that requires a near-perfect performance to beat, i.e., 297/300; Recording Ticket Gold Mode consists of only one level, with songs randomly chosen from all 5 difficulty levels.

Daigasso! Band Brothers utilizes the Nintendo DS' Wireless Link connection to allow multiple players to join in and make music. In 2 to 8 player link-ups, each player, like in solo player mode, takes command of one specific instrument in the music piece. Each player in the group is part of a band and must play the song together as a group; the better each player follows along, the more in tune the song comes through. Every note played, right or wrong, can be heard on the other players' systems, and if every single part in the song is played by a human, absolutely nothing will be automated. Scores are measured by percentage of notes hit; each player's percentage is represented by a balloon in the bottom screen. This lets everyone know how they are doing compared to their friends' scores.

Another feature is a full-blown music editor allowing the player to create their own custom tunes, using the touch screen to select the notes. It contains the basic features of any MIDI composer, although the players are limited to 8 parts in a song, and not every single MIDI instrument is available. This mode is used by many people to recreate tunes from video games or other MIDIs using a program to convert them into sheet music. There is also a mode in which players can sing or hum a tune into the Nintendo DS microphone, which will be recognized by the game and converted into notes on the screen. Any musical piece the player composes can be transmitted wirelessly to a friend's cart(s) so they can play the song.

== Song list ==
Song	Performer(s)/Media of origin	Theme	Type
Abarenbō Shōgun Theme	Abarenbō Shōgun	TV	Unlockable
Animal Crossing Title Theme	Animal Crossing	Game	Expansion
Aoi Bench	Sasuke	J-Pop & Anime	Expansion
Athletic Medley (Note: Csikós Post by Hermann Necke; Radetzky March by Johann Strauss Sr.; Hungarian Dance No. 5 by Johannes Brahms; Trepak from The Nutcracker by Pyotr Ilyich Tchaikovsky; Toreador Song from Carmen by Georges Bizet; Tritsch-Tratsch-Polka by Johann Strauss II; Galop Infernal from Orpheus in the Underworld by Jacques Offenbach.)	Various	Classic	Stock
Athletic	Super Mario World 2: Yoshi's Island	Game	Expansion
Ayumi's Theme	Famicom Tantei Club	Game	Expansion
Azusa Ni-Gō	Karyūdo	J-Pop & Anime	Expansion
Barbara Bat Theme	Daigasso! Band Brothers	Game	Unlockable
Children's Songs Medley (Note: The Other Day I Met a Bear; If You're Happy and You Know It (using the melody from the cover by Kyū Sakamoto); Picnic (ja:ピクニック (童謡))); Twinkle, Twinkle, Little Star; Vltava from Má vlast; Ah, Lovely Meadows (ja:おお牧場はみどり); Home! Sweet Home!.)	Various	World	Stock
Choo Choo TRAIN	Exile	J-Pop	Stock
Christmas Medley (Note: Silent Night; Jingle Bells; O Tannenbaum (Oh Christmas Tree); Angels We Have Heard on High; Joy to the World)	Various	World	Stock
DAYS	FLOW (from Eureka Seven)	J-Pop & Anime	Expansion
Donkey Kong Jungle Beat Theme	Donkey Kong Jungle Beat	Game	Expansion
Dragostea din tei	O-Zone	World	Expansion
Eikō no Kakehashi	Yuzu	J-Pop & Anime	Expansion
The Entertainer	Scott Joplin	World	Stock
F-Zero Medley	F-Zero	Game	Stock
Famicom Medley	Famicom Disk System	Game	Stock
Fire Emblem Theme	Fire Emblem	Game	Stock
Foster Medley (Note: Oh, Susanna; Camptown Races; My Old Kentucky Home; Old Folks at Home; Beautiful Dreamer.)	Stephen Foster	World	Stock
The Four Seasons/Spring	Antonio Vivaldi	Classic	Stock
fragile	Every Little Thing (from Ainori)	TV	Stock
G-Men '75	G-Men '75	TV	Unlockable
Gekkō Ka	Janne Da Arc (from Black Jack anime)	J-Pop & Anime	Expansion
Hana	Orange Range	J-Pop & Anime	Expansion
Happy Material	Mahora Gakuen Chūtōbu 2-A (from Mahou Sensei Negima!)	J-Pop & Anime	Expansion
Hoshi no Kirby Medley	Kirby series	Game	Stock
Kirari! Sailor Dream	Sae (from Pretty Guardian Sailor Moon)	TV	Stock
Koko ni Shika Sakanai Hana	Kobukuro	J-Pop & Anime	Expansion
Love Parade	Orange Range	J-Pop & Anime	Expansion
Mario Medley (Note: Super Mario Bros. overworld theme; Super Mario World grasslands theme; Super Mario Bros. 3 grasslands theme; Super Mario Land grasslands theme; Super Mario Sunshine Isle Delfino theme; Super Mario 64 grasslands theme.)	Mario	Game	Stock
Matsuken Samba Part 2	Ken Matsudaira	J-Pop & Anime	Expansion
Melissa	Porno Graffitti (from Fullmetal Alchemist)	TV	Stock
Namonaki Uta	Mr. Children	J-Pop	Stock
Neomelodramatic	Porno Graffitti	J-Pop & Anime	Expansion
Nihon Break Kōgyō Shaka	Man Z	J-Pop & Anime	Expansion
Onegai! Señorita	Orange Range	J-Pop & Anime	Expansion
Point of No Return	Chemistry	J-Pop	Stock
Pocket Monsters Medley	Pokémon	Game	Stock
READY STEADY GO!	L'Arc~en~Ciel (from Fullmetal Alchemist)	TV	Stock
Renai Revolution 21	Morning Musume	J-Pop	Stock
Rewrite	ASIAN KUNG-FU GENERATION (from Fullmetal Alchemist)	J-Pop & Anime	Expansion
Russian Medley (Note: Kalinka by Ivan Larionov; Sabre Dance from Gayane by Aram Khachaturian; Here Comes the Postal Troika (ja:トロイカ) with no known author; an extract from Act 1 of Swan Lake by Pyotr Ilyich Tchaikovsky; Pictures at an Exhibition by Modest Mussorgsky; Korobeiniki with no known author.)	Various	World	Stock
Sakura	Ketsumeishi	J-Pop & Anime	Expansion
Sakuranbo	Ai Otsuka	J-Pop	Stock
SEASONS	Ayumi Hamasaki	J-Pop	Stock
Sekai ni Hitotsu Dake no Hana	SMAP	J-Pop & Anime	Expansion
Shanghai Honey	Orange Range	J-Pop	Stock
Slider	Super Mario 64 DS	Game	Expansion
Slow Classic Medley	Various (Note: Largo from Symphony No. 9 by Antonín Dvořák; Air on the G String by Johann Sebastian Bach as arranged by August Wilhelmj; Salut d'Amour by Edward Elgar.)	Classic	Stock
SMILY	Ai Ōtsuka	J-Pop & Anime	Expansion
Smoke on the Water	Deep Purple	World	Stock
SONG OF ASHLEY	WarioWare: Touched!	Game	Expansion
Sora mo Toberu Hazu	Spitz	J-Pop	Stock
Star Wolf Theme	Star Fox 64	Game	Expansion
Starry Heavens	day after tomorrow	J-Pop & Anime	Expansion
Tentai Kansoku	BUMP OF CHICKEN	J-Pop & Anime	Expansion
Tokotoko Yoshi	Yoshi Touch & Go	Game	Expansion
Tokusō Sentai Dekaranger	Psychic Lover (from Tokusou Sentai Dekaranger)	TV	Stock
Touch	Younha (from the Touch movie)	TV	Stock
Tsubasa	Undergraph	J-Pop & Anime	Expansion
WAY OF DIFFERENCE	GLAY (from Ainori)	TV	Stock
When the Saints Go Marching In	Dixieland Jazz	World	Stock
World Songs Medley (Note: Tico-Tico no Fubá from Brazil; La cumparsita from Uruguay; Hava Nagila, a Jewish folk song; La Bamba and La Cucaracha both from Mexico.)	Various	World	Stock
Yama e no Michi	Shin Onigashima	Game	Expansion
Yeah! Meccha Holiday	Aya Matsuura	J-Pop	Stock
Zelda no Densetsu Medley	The Legend of Zelda	Game	Stock
Zenbu Dakishimete	KinKi Kids	J-Pop	Stock
Zenryoku Shounen	Sukima Switch	J-Pop & Anime	Expansion

== Development ==
The game first appeared at the Tokyo Game Show in the Spring of 2001, where it was announced for the Game Boy Advance—although it was originally being developed for the Game Boy Color—under the tentative name Game Boy Music. It lacked many of the features in the DS game, such as the touch screen and wireless multiplayer, but it had a wide variety of instruments to play, and featured the same graphical style as the DS game; it also starred the game's mascot, who would eventually be named Barbara the Bat. The game was delayed for several reasons, but the two main reasons were:

1. The limited technology of the Game Boy systems made it difficult to produce a good music game; in particular, the lack of buttons and an inadequate sound system.
2. The developers of the game had trouble getting Nintendo to approve the new characters they created, as a new character would not have the automatic appeal of an existing character.

Eventually, Daigasso! Band Brothers was released in Japan for the Nintendo DS in 2004 as a launch title; the game was also announced for a North American release, and as late as September 2006, it was listed as "in development", but is no longer found on Nintendo of America's website. It was also listed as "To Be Confirmed" on Nintendo Australia's website until its last relaunch.

In September 2005, Nintendo released an expansion pack titled Daigasso! Band Brothers Tsuika Kyoku Cartridge (or Great Concert! Band Brothers Request Selection Cartridge in English). The expansion comes in the form of a GBA cartridge, which is inserted into the DS at the same time as the original Band Brothers card, making Band Brothers the first DS game that uses the GBA port for more than some minor unlockables. It features 31 new songs, which were chosen based on a survey posted on Nintendo's website in July. The scores of the songs do not save after being played.

== Sequel ==
A sequel named Daigasso! Band Brothers DX was released for the Nintendo DS in Japan on June 26, 2008. It was released in Europe under the name Jam with the Band on May 21, 2010. The sequel is capable of interacting with the Wii through a game-specific channel called the Live Channel, known as the Speaker Channel in Japan. Jam with the Band also allowed the player to download new songs to the 8 megabyte capacity game cartridge via Nintendo Wi-Fi Connection.

== Daigasso! Band Brothers P ==
Another sequel named Daigasso! Band Brothers P was released for the Nintendo 3DS in Japan in November 2013, developed by Intelligent Systems. The game was discontinued in May 2020 and became unplayable.
