= Nintendo e-Reader =

Add-on for the Game Boy Advance

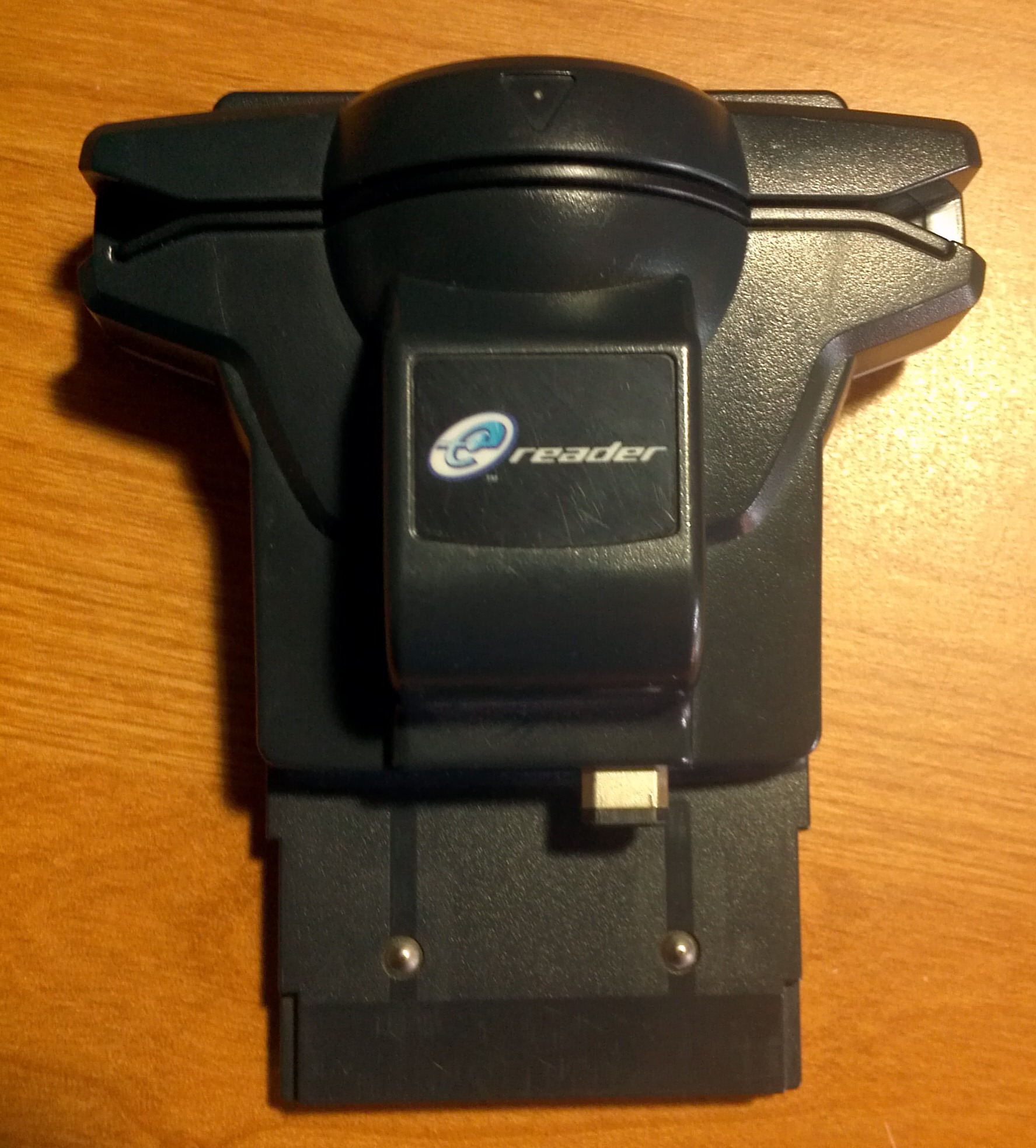
- Manufacturer: Nintendo
- Type: Add-on
- Released: Card e-Reader: JP: December 1, 2001; Card e-Reader+ / e-Reader: NA: September 16, 2002; JP: June 27, 2003; AU: October 31, 2003
- Discontinued: NA: Early 2004; JP: September 2008

The Nintendo e-Reader, (Note: Known in Japan as Card-e-Reader (Japanese: カードeリーダー, Hepburn: Kādo-Ī-Rīdā)) commonly abbreviated as e-Reader, is an add-on accessory by Japanese manufacturer Nintendo for its Game Boy Advance handheld video game console. It has an LED scanner that reads "e-Reader cards" — paper cards with specially encoded data printed on them as dot codes. It was released in Japan in December 2001 and in North America in September 2002.

Depending on the card and associated game, the e-cards are typically used in a key-like function to unlock secret items, levels, or play mini-games when swiped through the reader. The cards themselves contain data, as opposed to unlocking data already on the device itself.

== Usage and versions ==
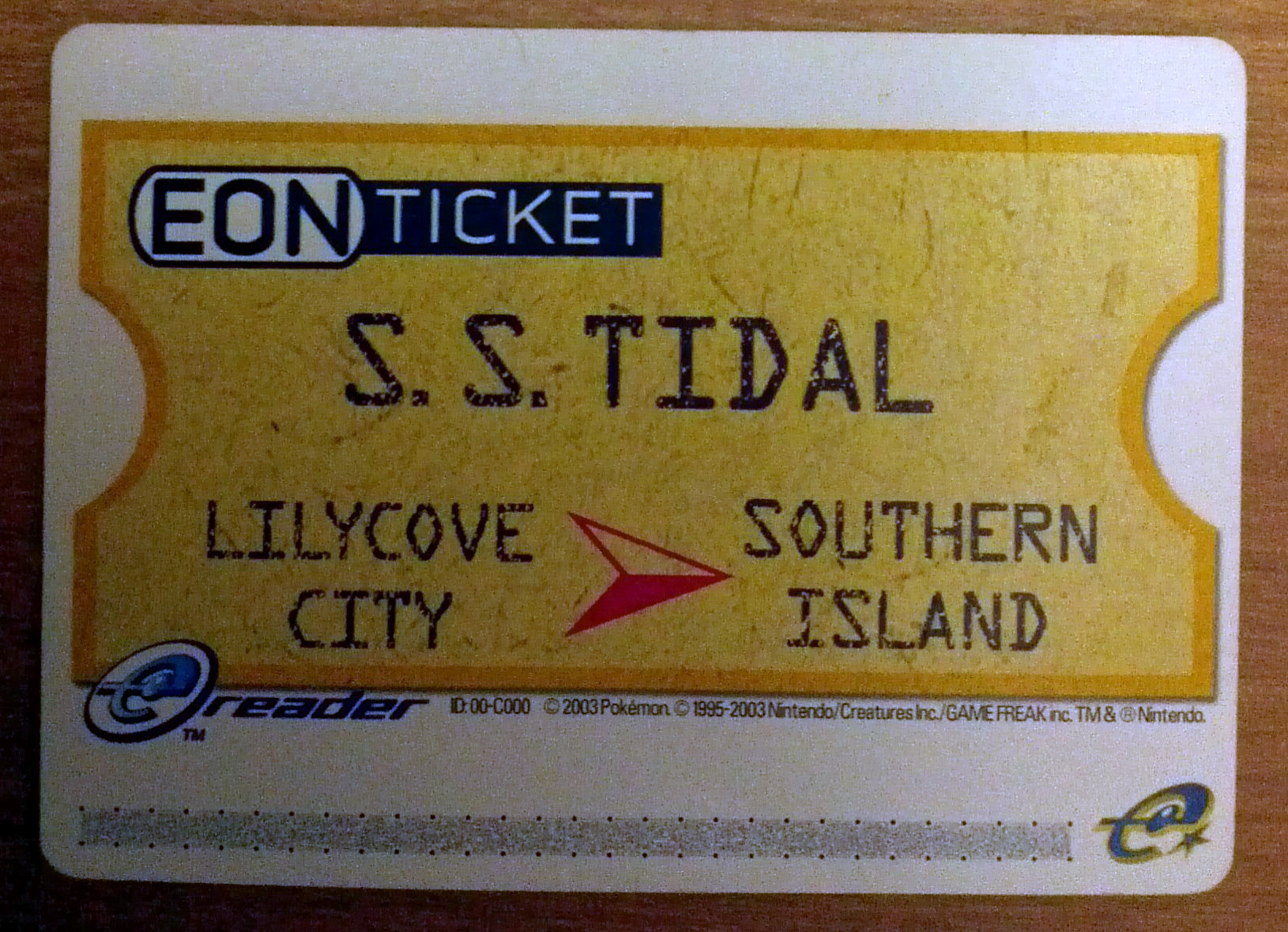
All e-Reader cards feature a printed dot code, seen here at the bottom, which are interpreted into data by scanning.

Two versions were released in Japan: the original Card-e-Reader (カードeリーダー, Kādo-Ī-Rīdā) without a link cable port (released on December 1, 2001), which could read cards to display the data stored on those cards; and the Card-e-Reader+ (カードeリーダー+, Kādo-Ī-Rīdā Purasu) (released on June 27, 2003) which came with a link cable port to connect with GameCube and Game Boy Advance games. Outside of Japan, only a single version was released, the e-Reader, which has the same functionality as the Card-e-Reader+ and was released in North America on September 16, 2002. In Japan, the Card-e-Reader+ was bundled with Animal Forest e+, the enhanced re-release of the GameCube version of Animal Crossing.

The e-Reader can connect via Game Link cable to GameCube games such as Animal Crossing, and Game Boy Advance games such as Pokémon Ruby and Sapphire and Super Mario Advance 4: Super Mario Bros. 3. In order to scan data and send it to a Game Boy Advance game, two Game Boy Advance systems and a Game Link cable are required. The Game Boy Advance system that the e-Reader is connected to uses the Player 1 end, while the other system uses the Player 2 end. After opening the necessary menu in the game, cards can be swiped in the e-Reader to transfer data to the other system. This is not possible with the Nintendo DS due to the system's lack of support for the Game Link cable.

The e-Reader was only considered successful in Japan. In 2004, Nintendo's head European PR confirmed that the e-Reader would not be releasing in Europe, following a year of confusion surrounding the subject. It was discontinued in North America in early 2004, due to a lack of popularity. In Japan, it sold much better and was produced until the discontinuation of the Game Boy hardware line.

=== Dot code ===
Data is encoded on the cards using "dot code", a specialized barcode technology licensed from Olympus Corporation. e-Reader Cards may have one or two sets of dot code on them, either a wide strip on the left side of the card, a wide strip on both the left and right sides of the card, a narrow strip on the bottom of the card or a short strip on the bottom of the card with a long strip on the left side of the card. Smaller games may require scanning only one card (two sets of dot code), while the greater NES games can require as many as five cards (nine to ten sets of dot code) in order to start the application.

The shorter sets of dot code were only used with the Pokémon Trading Card Game. Cards released in regular sets published by both Nintendo and Wizards of the Coast had a dot code on the bottom side of the card. When scanned, the e-Reader displayed a Pokédex data entry for the Pokémon shown on the card. Many of the cards published by Wizards of the Coast included a left side dot code that would allow users to play mini-games, animations, and use secret attacks in the Trading Card Game or play with various songs and graphics.

== Compatibility ==
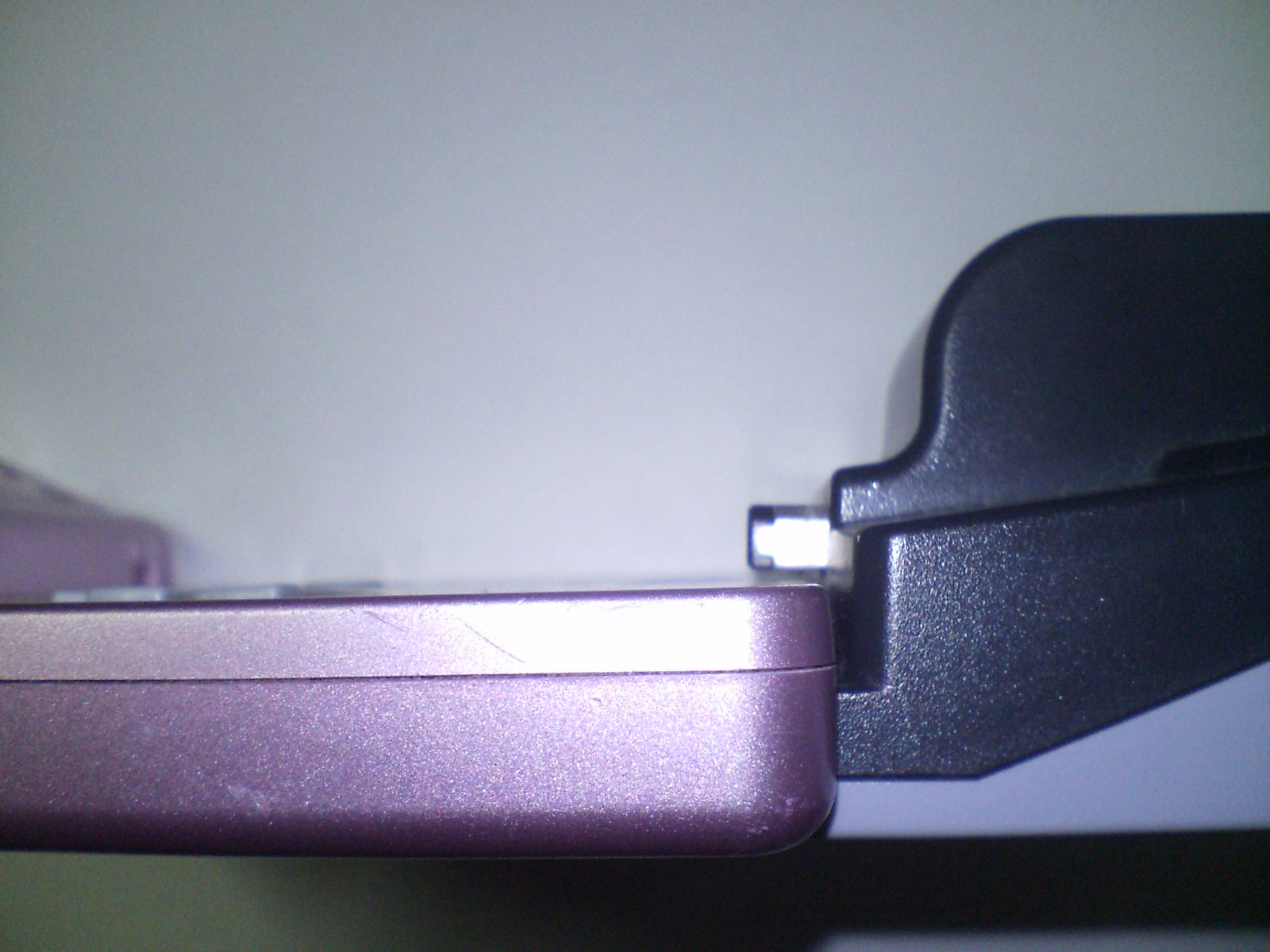
Because of the Game Boy Advance SP's different form factor, the e-Reader does not mount flush when connected to the system.

The e-Reader plugs into the cartridge slot of the Game Boy Advance like a regular game would. The end of the e-Reader sticks out from the Game Boy Advance unit to provide a slot to scan the e-Reader Cards. Electronically, the e-Reader is compatible with any console that supports Game Boy Advance games, but it may be mechanically incompatible with some systems (it simply does not fit), and the ability to link consoles may not be available.

Once installed, the link cable connector on the Game Boy Advance is obstructed, but a pass-through connection on the e-Reader allows link-up features to be used. The Game Boy Advance SP is also fully compatible, although the e-Reader does not mount flush with the SP. As the link cable connector on the SP is unobstructed, the pass-through on the e-Reader is not used. An additional cover (AGB-016) can be added to the e-reader in order to avoid damaging the 6 pin connector when linked to a GBA SP.

The Game Boy Player is also fully compatible, and the e-Reader connects as it would to a Game Boy Advance (the e-Reader pass-through connector is used for connecting the link cable). The GameCube hosting this system acts as a Game Boy Advance - in order to link to a GameCube game, a second GameCube (or a Wii) running the game in question, must be used.

The e-Reader can fit into the DS Lite, but not the original DS. The e-Reader can, however, be modified to fit into the original DS. In either case, there is no support for linking features, as neither system has a link cable port.

The e-Reader fits into the Game Boy Micro and has a link cable port, but not a standard connector. A special Game Boy Micro Game Link Cable must be used for linking features. The Game Boy Micro's non-standard link cable port can not accept the GameCube Game Boy Advance Cable, meaning it cannot link with GameCube games without modification to the cable.

Because the first version of the Japanese e-Reader did not have a link cable pass-through connector, it can fit into consoles which the later e-Readers are incompatible with. Even though the Game Boy Advance and the DS are region-free, Japanese e-Reader cards work only on Japanese e-Readers and North American e-Reader cards will only work on North American e-Readers. The system will display 'region error' on both systems if a user attempts to use another region's cards on their own device.

== Game list ==
=== Classic NES Series ===
Each game in this series comes in a pack of five cards, each of which must be scanned twice, on both sides. There are thirteen games in this series; each is a direct port of the one-player mode of the classic NES game of the same title (minus the added "-e" suffix), with multiplayer functions removed. Several games released as e-Reader cards were later released in cartridge form as part of the Classic NES Series on Game Boy Advance, while all games except Urban Champion were included as unlockables in the GameCube game Animal Crossing, which could also be played on Game Boy Advance through the "Advance Play" feature.

All NES titles released include:

- Balloon Fight
- Baseball
- Clu Clu Land
- Donkey Kong
- Donkey Kong Jr.
- Donkey Kong 3
- Excitebike
- Golf
- Ice Climber
- Mario Bros.
- Pinball
- Tennis
- Urban Champion

=== Animal Crossing-e ===
A series of Animal Crossing cards were released for the e-Reader. When used with the post office in the game, the cards provide items to players, unlock "town tunes", or unlock new designs to be used around the village. Some are "sibling" cards (series 2–4) with two related characters on the front. In addition to being sold in card packs, some regular series cards were distributed on a promotional basis through GameStop, EB Games, and Energizer batteries.

=== Pokémon Battle-e ===
The Pokémon Battle-e Cards, when scanned into Pokémon Ruby or Sapphire, allow the player to load up special trainers to battle or to get special berries. In Japan, the series was sold as six sets, each with a different theme, with 10 cards in each set (8 trainers, 1 berry, and 1 checklist), while in the US, the series was packaged together to have two themes per pack. In addition, 2 promo cards, 1 for each version, were packed in with the games. The cards are loaded into Ruby or Sapphire through the Mystery Events function once it is unlocked.

There are additional Battle-e card sets for Pokémon FireRed, LeafGreen and Emerald in Japan, but due to the e-Reader being discontinued in the US they were never released in other regions. The e-Reader functionality was eventually removed from all non-Japanese versions of the games.

=== Pokémon Colosseum ===
In Pokémon Colosseum, there is a Colosseum at the back of Phenac City. There are two large doors, which in the English version lead to the same arena. In the Japanese version the right door goes to the arena, while the left door leads to a special e-Reader area where players can scan in extra cards to battle additional trainers and capture three more Shadow Pokémon.

=== Pokémon Pinball: Ruby & Sapphire ===
There are five cards that were released that were compatible with the Japanese version. These cards make minor tweaks to the gameplay, but do not add any new features.

Card ID	Card title	Card effect	Promotion
09‑A001	Bonus Stage Card	Allows players to play the bonus stage of their choice.	Pokémon Scoop (Summer 2003); Pokémon Festa 2003
09-A002	GET Special Guests Card	Unlocks one of the following Pokémon for capture: Chikorita, Cyndaquil, Totodile or Aerodactyl.	Demo cards placed in selected stores in Japan throughout September 2003 (not for distribution).
09‑A003	Ruin Area Card	Allows players to start their games from the Ruins.	Distributed to customers who purchase the game at Pokémon Centers.
09‑A004	DX Mode Card	Allows players to start with 9 balls (lives), Master Ball and 99 coins; in addition, Pichu rescuer will always be enabled throughout the game.	Distributed to customers who purchase the game at Pokémon Centers.
09‑A005	Encounter Rate UP Card	The likelihood of encountering Chikorita, Cyndaquil, Totodile and Aerodactyl increases.	Distributed to customers who purchase the game at Pokémon Centers.

=== Super Mario Advance 4: Super Mario Bros. 3-e ===
There are 36 cards, divided into two series: 18 for Series 1 and 18 for Series 2. In each package of 18 cards there are five demo cards, five level cards, eight power-up cards, and a promotional card without data strips which only contains an advertisement for the Pokémon Battle-e cards. More were released in Japan, but they never saw American release due to the discontinuation of the device.

Two promotional cards come packed in with every US and Australian copy of the game sold. Five additional cards were released for a very short time and were packed in with the game and sold exclusively at Walmart stores in the US. These five cards have become extremely hard to find, as the e-Reader was discontinued in North America not long after the release of the game. The two e-Reader cards that were initially bundled with Super Mario Advance 4 have since been discontinued.

The re-releases of the game for Wii U Virtual Console and Nintendo Classics include all of the e-Reader levels, including those that were never released outside of Japan.

=== Mega Man Battle Network and Mega Man Zero 3 cards ===
The Japanese Mega Man games for GBA use Card Reader e+ cards to customize their game with the e-Reader +. The cards cause various effects, such as Base HP, Abilities, Buster Changes, Charge Shot Modifications, and B+ Back Abilities. There are also Item Cards which can give out sets of Battle Chips, Sub Chips, BugFrags, Zenny, or Navi Customizer Programs (only introduced in Mega Man Battle Network 6 Modification Card Part 1 & Battle Network 6 Modification Card Part 2). They can also trigger negative effects ('Bugs'), such as causing Mega Man to lose health and move the wrong way, or causing the player to be unable to control it. As for the Mega Man Zero 3 cards, they change the Resistance Base and add an overhaul of new things to it as well as Weapon Upgrades and Bullet Appearances to make an actual Buster Shot look like a real bullet that an actual gun fires.

The only way to gain the cards' effects in the English versions is through various cheating devices, such as Code Breaker, Action Replay and GameShark (although in Battle Network 6 all e-Reader content was removed from the European and American versions, and can no longer be accessed). The Mega Man Zero Collection, Mega Man Zero/ZX Legacy Collection, and Mega Man Battle Network Legacy Collection releases include the e-Reader bonuses for Mega Man Zero 3 and Battle Network 4–6 as unlockables, marking the first time they have been legitimately accessible outside of Japan.

=== F-Zero: GP Legend ===
Exclusive to the Japanese version, e+ cards can be used to unlock additional machines, race courses, and staff ghosts to race in the game's time trial mode.

=== Other ===
- E3 2002 Promo Pack: A very rare promotional pack given away at the 2002 E3 conference, this pack contains a variant Manhole e-card, two Pokémon trading card game cards and a Kirby card that, when scanned, tells the player if they have won a prize. The Kirby card is considered to be the rarest e-Reader card produced.
- Mario Party-e: A complete card game with 64 cards using the e-Reader for minigames.
  - Mario Party-e Promo Card: While not an e-Reader Card (the card contains no dot codes), a promotional "Two Coin Card" was packed with GamePro magazine and can be fully used with the Mario Party-e game.
- Air Hockey-e: A promotional card given away at various retailers when the e-Reader was initially released. This card plays a real game of fast-paced air hockey. An AU-exclusive version of this card was packed in with the e-Reader when sold in Australia.
- Manhole-e: A port of the original Game & Watch game. Included with the e-Reader, the player must close the manholes as pedestrians pass by. A complete Game & Watch card series was planned for release, including remakes based on those seen in the Game & Watch Gallery series, but never made it to stores.
- FoxBox Kirby Slide Puzzle: A slide puzzle game included in issue 175 of Nintendo Power and in an issue of Tips & Tricks Magazine. It was also given away with FoxBox promotional boxes at Toys R Us.
- EON Ticket: A promotional card given away at E3, at Toys R Us during the EON Ticket Summer Tour in 2003 and in issue 173 of Nintendo Power. This card is used to get Latias in Pokémon Ruby or Latios in Pokémon Sapphire by allowing the player access to the Southern Island location.
- Pokémon Channel: Three US exclusive cards and three Australian variant cards were released with the GameCube game Pokémon Channel. The USA version holds a "6-Pattern" card, a Pikachu card and a Kyogre card, whereas the Australian version has a Jirachi card, instead of the Kyogre card.
- Domo-Kun no Fushigi Terebi: Released in packs exclusively throughout Japan, little is known about this series to English-speakers. The cards extend the original title by a great number of mini-games and events not available on the cartridge.
- Mario vs. Donkey Kong: CoroCoro Comic had a competition where 1,000 people won a set of five cards, and a sixth was distributed at the 2004 Next-Generation World Hobby Fair. Despite there being data for twelve levels within the game, only these six cards were released. They are considered to be among the rarest of e-Cards. While connecting the North American version of the game to a Japanese e-Reader+ and fully scanning one of the cards will reveal the e-Reader menu, the cards cannot be used to unlock any levels, but all versions of the GBA game have the data for these 12 levels, unlockable via Action Replay codes.
- Pikmin 2-e: Exclusive to Japan, six packs of e-Reader minigames were released subsequent to the release of Pikmin 2. These games challenge players to pluck all the Pikmin in an area in a set amount of steps, to try to get Pikmin from one point to another without injury, etc. The cards contain region-specific encoding blocking their use with North American systems.

== Summary ==
Title	Type	Release Year
Air Hockey-e	Game	2002
Animal Crossing-e	Data	2003
Classic NES Series: Balloon Fight	Game	2002
Classic NES Series: Baseball	Game	2002
Classic NES Series: Clu Clu Land	Game	2003
Classic NES Series: Donkey Kong	Game	2002
Classic NES Series: Donkey Kong 3	Game	2003
Classic NES Series: Donkey Kong Jr.	Game	2002
Classic NES Series: Excitebike	Game	2002
Classic NES Series: Golf	Game	2003
Classic NES Series: Ice Climber	Game	2002
Classic NES Series: Mario Bros.	Game	2002
Classic NES Series: Pinball	Game	2002
Classic NES Series: Tennis	Game	2002
Classic NES Series: Urban Champion	Game	2002
Domo-kun Card-e	Game	2003
Eon Ticket e-Card	Data	2003
F-Zero: GP Legend (e-Reader cards)	Data	2003
Hamtaro Card-e	Game	2003
Kirby Slide	Game	2003
Manhole	Game	2002
Mario Party-e	Game	2003
Mario vs. Donkey Kong (e-Reader cards)	Data	2004
Pikmin 2-e	Game	2004
Pokémon Aquapolis	Game	2003
Pokémon Battle-e	Data	2003
Pokémon Channel (e-Reader cards)	Data	2003
Pokémon Expedition	Game	2002
Pokémon Pinball: Ruby & Sapphire (e-Reader cards)	Data	2003
Pokémon Skyridge	Game	2003
Rockman Zero 3 Kaizou (Modification) Cards	Data	2004
Rockman.EXE 4 Kaizou (Modification) Cards	Data	2004
Rockman.EXE 5 Kaizou (Modification) Cards	Data	2004
Rockman.EXE 6 Kaizou (Modification) Cards	Data	2004
Super Mario Advance 4: Super Mario Bros. 3-e	Data	2003
