= Pinball (1984 video game) =

1984 video game

- North American NES box art
- Developers: Nintendo R&D1; HAL Laboratory
- Publisher: Nintendo
- Programmers: Satoru Iwata; Satoshi Matsuoka
- Composer: Yukio Kaneoka
- Platforms: NES, arcade, Famicom Disk System, Nintendo e-Reader
- Release: February 2, 1984: NES; JP: February 2, 1984; NA: October 18, 1985; EU: September 1, 1986 Arcade (VS. Pinball); JP: August 1984; NA: October 1984 Famicom Disk System; JP: May 30, 1989 e-Reader; NA: September 16, 2002
- Genre: Pinball
- Modes: Single-player, multiplayer
- Arcade system: Nintendo VS. System

Pinball (Note: Japanese: ピンボール, Hepburn: Pinbōru) is a pinball video game developed by Nintendo and HAL Laboratory and published by Nintendo for the Nintendo Entertainment System. It is based on a Game & Watch unit of the same name, and was first released for the Famicom in Japan in 1984. It was later released for arcades on the Nintendo VS. System in Japan and North America in 1984. In 1985, it was a launch game for the Nintendo Entertainment System in North America.

== Gameplay ==
The player controls the paddles of a virtual pinball machine. Two screens represent the traditional pinball table plus a bonus mode. The player launches a ball with the plunger from the first screen—the bottom of the pinball table—through the top of the screen to the second screen. Play moves to the first screen if the ball falls through the bottom of the top screen and returns to the top screen if the ball is hit back through the space at the top of the first screen. The player controls the flippers on either screen to deflect the ball to keep it from falling off the bottom of the lower screen.

Pinball has a secondary Breakout-like mode, which the player reaches by hitting the ball into a bonus hole that takes the player to a bonus stage to control Mario carrying a platform. The object of this mode is to rescue Pauline who had debuted with Mario in Donkey Kong (1981). The player achieves this by bouncing the ball off Mario's platform and hitting various targets, the destruction of which also earns points. When the blocks under her are all gone, she will drop. Catching her on Mario's platform earns bonus points, but allowing her to hit the ground causes the player to lose.

== Development ==
The hardest part of the development process was collision detection. Due to the limited computing power available an approximation was used treating a curved surface as a series of squares.

== Re-releases ==
Pinball was re-released on NES in 1985, and for the Family Computer Disk System on May 30, 1989.

In the 1990s, Pinball was exclusively re-released in Germany with new box and manual art under the "Classic Series" label.

The game is unlockable within the 2001 games Dōbutsu no Mori for the Nintendo 64 and its GameCube port, Animal Crossing. The latter can be played on a Game Boy Advance via a link cable. In 2002, Pinball was re-released for the e-Reader on the Game Boy Advance.

Pinball was released on Virtual Console for the Wii on November 19, 2006 in North America, December 2 in Japan, and December 15 in PAL region, and on Wii U on October 24, 2013. It was released via the Nintendo Classics service on May 26, 2022. The arcade version was released by Hamster Corporation as part of their Arcade Archives series on the Nintendo Switch on August 30, 2019.

== Reception ==
Reception

Review scores
| Publication | Score |
|---|---|
| Nintendo Life | 6/10 |
| Power Play (DE) | 3.5/10 |
| Tilt | 15/20 |

Pinball received mixed reviews. German magazine Power Play said that although the game was fun, it was not worth its price at the time, and thought it should be cheaper. French publication Tilt praised the speed of the game, but noted the games drawbacks in having limited multiplayer support and the odd physics glitch. Corbie Dillard from Nintendo Life stated that for 500 Wii Points, "you'd be hard-pressed to find a better game for those times when you just need a quick and simple pinball fix without a lot of bells & whistles".

In Japan, Game Machine listed VS. Pinball as the 24th most successful table arcade unit of September 1984.

Over 1 million units were sold.
