= Jam with the Band =

2008 video game

- European box art
- Developer: Nintendo SPD
- Publisher: Nintendo
- Director: Noriko Kitamura
- Producer: Shinya Takahashi
- Composers: Asuka Ito; Megumi Inoue; Masaru Tajima; Toshiyuki Sudo; Minako Hamano
- Platform: Nintendo DS
- Release: JP: June 26, 2008; EU: May 21, 2010
- Genre: Music game
- Modes: Single player, multiplayer

Jam with the Band, known in Japan as Daigasso! Band Brothers DX, (Note: Japanese: 大合奏!バンドブラザーズDX, Hepburn: Daigassō! Bando Burazāzu DX; lit. Grand Ensemble! Band Brothers DX) is a music video game developed and published by Nintendo for the Nintendo DS handheld game console. It is the sequel to the Japan-exclusive Daigasso! Band Brothers, which was released at the DS' launch. Jam with the Band was released in Japan in June 2008 and in Europe in May 2010. Its release was accompanied by a Wii Channel for the Wii console called the Live Channel, known in Japan as the Speaker Channel, that allows players to hear the game's sound through their television. It features the character Barbara Bat, who was also in the predecessor.

It has been very well received commercially. It sold more than 120,000 copies in Japan in its first four days of release; at approximately 424,477 units, it sold well enough to become the 24th best-selling game of 2008 in Japan. It has also received positive reception. Jam with the Band features more than 60 instruments that can be played. Its gameplay focuses on button input similar to its predecessor, which involves notes that scroll down and an arrow to indicate when to hit them. Players may create and download songs, though the download limit was 100 due to JASRAC licensing issues. The Japanese list of songs consisted of more than 4,000 songs. Players could preview the song before downloading, and also rate them on a scale of one to five. The game was followed up in 2013 by the Japan-only release of the Nintendo 3DS game Daigasso! Band Brothers P.

== Gameplay ==
Jam with the Band features more than 60 instruments that can be played. During gameplay, Jam with the Band's gameplay focuses on button input similar to its predecessor. It also includes the ability to play chords instead of single button inputs for certain instruments. The buttons used increases as the difficulty increases—while on the lowest difficulty, any of the buttons may be used to hit a note, while the hardest difficulty usually makes use of all buttons. The notes scroll down at a certain speed, and the players must hit a note with the corresponding button. There are four ways a player may hit a note - "Best", "Good", "Bad", and "Miss". There is no health meter in Jam with the Band, allowing players to play the song to completion. A song can have a number of different ways to play it—if the song uses both a string and percussion instruments, players may play through it with either. Up to eight players may play together, each able to choose from one of the instruments available in a song. It also makes use of the microphone for an alternate mode of play which allows players to do karaoke to songs that include lyrics using the Nintendo DS' microphone.

Players can connect their game to a Wii console and utilize a game-specific Wii Channel called the Live Channel, known in Japan as the Speaker Channel, which transmits the game's audio through the television. Players could also download up to 100 songs out of over 1000 onto the game, via Nintendo Wi-Fi Connection which has ceased service, as well as play locally with up to eight people using single-card download play.

=== Song list ===
The Japanese version of Jam with the Band features 31 songs, which are mostly classical songs, while the European release includes 50 pre-installed songs. The Japanese version's roster included more than 4,000 downloadable songs created by users. It has enough storage space to hold 231 songs—the 31 default songs, 100 downloadable songs, and 100 custom-made songs. Once a song is downloaded, it cannot be deleted from the Japanese version's game data unless the player erases the save data, owing to legal issues with JASRAC. Jam with the Band features the largest capacity save chip currently used in a DS game. The chip has a capacity of 64 megabits (eight megabytes) of save data.

While it is Japan-oriented, the Japanese version features international songs, such as the "Ghostbusters theme", "When You Wish Upon A Star", "Highway Star", "Locomotion", and "The Final Countdown".

== Development ==
Jam with the Band was announced on Nintendo's Japanese website, and was eventually released in Japan on June 26, 2008. The game was released in Europe on May 21, 2010.

While previously it wasn't possible to run Jam with the Band on flashcarts on the Nintendo DS, several patches and fixes have been made to allow the use of an 8 MB save file, which the game uses. Nevertheless, flashcarts are unable to use the Wi-Fi Download function, as Nintendo's server keeps track of the IDs assigned to each physical copy of the game, which, even though they can be faked on flashcarts, the amount of possible IDs makes it for an extremely low chance to happen upon an ID that actually exists, thus effectively stopping illegal copies from downloading songs.

== Reception ==
In its first four days of release, Jam with the Band sold 120,000 copies in Japan. It is the 24th best-selling game of Japan in 2008, selling approximately 424,477 units. It was also the 161st best-selling game in Japan in 2009, selling 73,108 copies. As of the end of 2009, it has sold approximately 518,722 copies.

In their review of the Japanese version, Edge described Jam with the Band as the finest Nintendo DS game in recent memory. They described it as unapologetic in its simplicity. They also said it was more difficult than more popular rhythm games, such as Guitar Hero, making reference to one of the most difficult songs in Guitar Hero called "Through the Fire and Flames". They bemoaned the fact that players could only download 100 songs and cannot delete them, they praised it for having a "remarkably generous library". They also praised its Wii Channel, praising it as an excellent use of the Wii compared to how Wii games such as Wii Fit and Mario Kart Wii use it. IGN praised it as well, calling it an "enjoyable music game packed with value and personality".

Jam with the Band's lack of an English release prior to the European announcement was viewed as disappointing by IGN, which listed it amongst four other Nintendo DS games as ones that should be released stateside.
