= Super Mario Advance 4: Super Mario Bros. 3 =

2003 video game

- European box art
- Developer: Nintendo R&D2
- Publisher: Nintendo
- Director: Hiroyuki Kimura
- Producer: Takashi Tezuka
- Designers: Yasuhisa Yamamura; Shigeyuki Asuke
- Series: Super Mario
- Platform: Game Boy Advance
- Release: JP: July 11, 2003; EU: October 17, 2003; NA: October 21, 2003; AU: October 24, 2003
- Genre: Platform
- Modes: Single player, multiplayer

Super Mario Advance 4: Super Mario Bros. 3 (Note: Known in Japan as Super Mario Advance 4 (Japanese: スーパーマリオアドバンス4, Hepburn: Sūpā Mario Adobansu fō)) is a 2003 platform game developed and published by Nintendo for the Game Boy Advance. It was released in Japan, and later released in Europe, North America, and Australia. It is an enhanced remake of the 1988 NES video game Super Mario Bros. 3, and is based on the remake found in Super Mario All-Stars for the Super Nintendo Entertainment System. Players control either Mario or Luigi as they travel through the eight kingdoms of the Mushroom World to rescue Princess Peach from Bowser. The game was revealed at Nintendo's conference at the E3 2003 convention. It contains several enhancements, including the addition of Mario and Luigi's voices by Charles Martinet, the ability to scan e-Cards into Nintendo's e-Reader to add certain content, and a multiplayer mode based on the original arcade game Mario Bros.. The game also allows players to save replays of their gameplay.

The e-Reader compatibility received some interest from critics before the game's release; however, the e-Reader itself proved to be a failure. This led to two of the four e-Reader card series to only be released in Japan, and for the game to get a new version that does not market e-Reader capability. Critics generally felt that the e-Reader connectivity was sub-optimal, but that the content offered through it was high quality. Super Mario Advance 4 was critically acclaimed, and the game sold 2.88 million copies in North America. This version was eventually re-released on the Wii U's eShop and later on the Nintendo Switch's Nintendo Classics service. Both versions featured all e-Reader levels, including levels originally only available in Japan.

== Gameplay ==
The gameplay is the same as in the original version of Super Mario Bros. 3 for the Nintendo Entertainment System. Players take control of either Mario or Luigi, adventuring through eight kingdoms of the Mushroom World to defeat the seven Koopa Kids and Bowser, who have taken the seven magic rods from the kings of these seven kingdoms, transforming them into various creatures. Players are able to make use of several basic techniques such as running, jumping, and swimming. The objective of each stage is to reach a certain goal, which is typically a black background with a rotating box containing either a mushroom, flower, or star. Players access the levels by exploring various maps; once a level is complete, players may not replay it until they beat the game. This map has several features on it, such as bridges that lower after completing a level or Hammer Bros. that wander around the map. There are several kinds of levels, including a dungeon level and an airship level. Outside of the main mode of play, players may also play a remake of the Mario Bros. game, which has been included in all Super Mario Advance games previous to it. It supports anywhere from one to four players.

It retains the power-ups from Super Mario Bros. 3, including the basic power-ups of the Super Mushroom, Fire Flower, and Starman, as well as the Super Leaf, Tanooki Suit, Frog Suit, and Hammer Bros. Suit, all introduced in the original release. The Super Mushroom increases the player-character's size; the Fire Flower gives him a fireball attack; the Starman makes him invincible; the Super Leaf gives him a tail that lets him attack enemies by spinning and allows him to fly; the Tanooki Suit is a modified Super Leaf, giving him the ability to turn into a statue; the Frog Suit allows him to jump high and swim faster; and the Hammer Bros. Suit gives Mario a hammer projectile. Less common power-ups include these: a whistle, which allows players to go to other lands; a hammer, which allows them to gain access to new areas; and a cloud, which allows them to skip one level.

=== e-Cards ===
Vegetable Volley, an e-reader level that features turnips borrowed from Super Mario Bros. 2.

Super Mario Advance 4, excluding the European version of the game, is compatible with the Nintendo e-Reader, allowing players to scan certain e-Cards into the device utilizing two Game Boy Advances, the e-Reader, and a copy of Super Mario Advance 4. Once a card is scanned, it adds certain content to the game. One of the most prominent features included is the ability to add stages to the in-game area World E; the player is allowed to have 32 extra stages on one copy of the game. Stages included remakes of levels from Super Mario Bros. as well as original stages. Many of these original stages contain brand-new mechanics and stage elements, such as Super Mario Bros. 2's turnips. E-Card types also include the demo card, which allows players to view tips and tricks as performed by the developers for certain stages; the power-up cards, which allow players to add certain power-ups to their inventory, depending on which card they have; and the switch card, which causes changes to the game, such as adding projectiles from Super Mario Bros. 2 and causing enemies who have been hit by fireballs to turn into coins. Two item cards introduce new items to the game. The more common of the two is the Cape Feather card, which gives players said item from Super Mario World.

== Development ==
Super Mario Advance 4: Super Mario Bros. 3 was first announced on a European release list, then titled Super Mario Advance 4. It was first revealed at the E3 2003 conference for the Game Boy Advance. Its graphics and engine are based on the Super Mario All-Stars version of Super Mario Bros. 3, not the original version for the Nintendo Entertainment System. Shigeru Miyamoto and Takashi Tezuka were involved as producers and supervisors with this game; out of all Mario remakes up to that point, this is the one they were most involved in. It adds voice acting as contributed by Charles Martinet, and features the Mario Bros. mini-game also contained in other Super Mario Advance remakes. It introduces compatibility with Nintendo's e-Reader device, allowing players to add or view various things, including power-ups, stages, upgrades, and demonstration videos. It also allows players to create their own videos, with the game automatically recording players' progress through each level, erasing whatever is not saved.

Yusuke Amano was one of Super Mario Advance 4's debuggers, and also worked on some of the game's e-Reader functionality. In particular, he worked coming up with the Super Skill movie cards as part of the Mario Club. Amano exclaimed in an interview that he was not very good at video games, though the game's map director, Shigeyuki Asuke, was particular about the quality of the Super Skill movies. One criticism levied was that one of the Super Skill movies "[didn't] look like a real person played it." Amano's work on these Super Skill movies resulted in Amano pushing for the inclusion of Hint Movies in New Super Mario Bros. Wii.

== Release ==
It was shown at several video game trade shows, including E3, the Nintendo Gamers Summit, the Games Conference, and the European Computer Trade Show. It has had multiple North American release dates planned, including September 11 and September 22, 2003, but was delayed both times. It was first released in Japan on July 11, 2003, followed by Europe on October 17, North America on October 21, and Australia on October 24. The release of Super Mario Advance 4 was accompanied by four series of e-Cards, with only the first two series released outside Japan due to the failure of the e-Reader. Originally, the game was bundled with two or seven e-Cards with the extra five being exclusive to the version sold at Walmart early in its North American release before a version was released that removed any mention of e-Cards or inclusion thereof.

The game was re-released on the Wii U Virtual Console in Japan on December 29, 2015, in North America on January 21, 2016, and in Europe on March 10, 2016. It includes e-Reader-exclusive content via the data select screen, including the PAL release, which did not originally feature e-Reader support due to the accessory not being released in those regions. The game was later re-released on the Nintendo Classics service on February 8, 2023, and once again included the e-Reader stages.

== Reception ==
Reception

Aggregate scores
Aggregator	Score
GameRankings	92%
Metacritic	94/100

Review scores
Publication	Score
Electronic Gaming Monthly	9.3/10
Eurogamer	9/10
Game Informer	9.5/10
GameSpot	8.9/10
GameSpy	4/5
IGN	9.5/10
Nintendo Power	9.2/10

Pre-release impressions tended to be positive. In his preview of Super Mario Advance 4, IGN writer Craig Harris criticized the inclusion of Mario Bros. in it due to its prominence in every Mario Advance title beforehand. However, he was anticipating the e-Reader functionality, a sentiment shared by fellow IGN writer Fran Mirabella and GameSpot writer Ricardo Torres. The new content introduced through the e-Reader was a point of anticipation for multiple critics, including 1UP.com staff and GameSpot writer Brad Shoemaker, who felt that the combination of Super Mario Bros. 3's "immense popularity" with the new content could make it the best Mario game on the platform.

Upon release, Super Mario Advance 4: Super Mario Bros. 3 was met with "universal acclaim" according to review aggregator Metacritic; on the site it holds an aggregate score of 94/100 based on 25 reviews, making it the third highest-rated Game Boy Advance game. It has been nominated for several awards, winning best Game Boy Advance platform game from both IGN and its readers. GameSpot named it the best Game Boy Advance game of October 2003 and nominated it for best platform game of the year, while its readers voted it the best Game Boy Advance game of the year. GameSpy named it the ninth best Game Boy Advance game of 2003, while its readers named it the sixth best.

Pocket Gamer gave it a perfect score, calling it "Mario hop-n-bop action at its finest" and "as great as it ever was". GameNow similarly gave it a perfect score, commenting that it was designed to keep players playing. Play gave it a perfect score, calling the challenge perfect. They praised its quick save feature, as well as the additional e-Reader features. Electronic Gaming Monthly praised its controls and stages, as well as its visuals, noting that they are good for an "old, trippy 2D game". Nintendo Power praised the game for remaining a quality game since its release. Yahoo! Games praised it as surpassing the original, including its Super Mario All-Stars remake. Author William Abner called it the "quintessential side-scrolling platform game", though noting that it showed the Game Boy Advance's limitations rather than its strengths. The Detroit Free Press' Heather Newman gave it a perfect four out of four stars, while USA Today called it a great game. Game Informer's Dan Ryckert criticized the naming system employed, describing it as "boneheaded", also criticizing the method by which players use the e-Cards. A Game Informer reviewer praised it as their favourite game ever, expressing delight that the game has a "finally ... [has a] high quality port".

While GameSpy's Benjamin Turner found the e-Reader utilization neat, he criticized it as a means by Nintendo to get people to buy the e-Reader, calling it unfortunate that those without the device or the means to use it would be left out. He also criticized the Game Boy Advance's smaller screen for making the gameplay more "claustrophobic". However, he called it an excellent game for Mario fans and newcomers alike. GameZone's jkdmedia commented that while fans found the lack of new content in previous games to be disappointing, the extra content was "shocking" to him, encouraging players to purchase an e-Reader to utilize it. He added that to kids of this era, it would be harder for them to appreciate it, comparing it to kids observing the change in television from black and white to colour or kids seeing Star Wars coming to theaters. 1UP.com noted that while the set up to get the e-Reader features was complicated, it was worth it. They commented that the demo cards were hilarious, though bemoaning the limited number of them. They also praised the game, commenting that younger players would get a chance to play it and older players would be able to play it again, praising its gameplay as well as its e-Reader enhancements. Eurogamer's Tom Bramwell commented that throughout the releases of the Super Mario Advance titles, he was waiting for Super Mario Bros. 3 to be re-released under the brand. He commented that this release was better than 90% of the video games of the 2004 Holiday season, praising Nintendo for the visual improvements over the Super Mario All-Stars release. However, they faulted Nintendo for giving Mario and Luigi voices, calling them annoying to the point where he would turn down the volume.

IGN cited its potential for expansion for why it was the best Mario remake on the Game Boy Advance, praising the original game's gameplay and presentation as well. He added that while it was a significant investment to make use of the feature, it was worth it. IGN's Craig Harris noted Super Mario Advance 4 as an example of a game that makes good use of the e-Reader. IGN ultimately named it game of the month for its release in North America and the 11th best Game Boy Advance game ever made, calling its concept of adding levels "ahead of its time". Game, Set, Watch's Eric Caoili called it a shame that players could not enjoy the e-Reader levels due to the difficulty of setting everything up, citing their included elements from Super Mario World and Super Mario World 2: Yoshi's Island. He added that they were also the only two-dimensional Mario levels made in between Yoshi's Island and New Super Mario Bros. GameSpot's Ryan Davis commented that purists may dislike some minor changes to the original game, they would enjoy the overall experience. He also described the e-Reader levels as "entertaining and fiercely challenging", though criticizing the method of adding them, explaining that it was both clunky and poorly explained to players. CNN.com described the repackaging of the original game on the Game Boy Advance as a "tremendous success."

Super Mario Advance 4 has been commercially successful; it sold in excess of 2.88 million copies in North America, 718,207 in Japan, and at least 135,000 copies in the United Kingdom, earning a Silver sales award from the ELSPA. The Guardian attributed an increase in revenue by 2.1% to sales of Super Mario Advance 4, which they describe as strong. It debuted in the United Kingdom as the 20th best-selling game of its week of release. For the week ending December 28, 2006, it was the best-selling Game Boy Advance game in North America.
