= Mario Bros. =

1983 video game

- North American arcade flyer
- Developer: Nintendo R&D1 (Note: NES version developed by Nintendo R&D1 and Intelligent Systems; Atari 2600 and 5200 versions developed by Atari, Inc.; PC-8001 version developed by MISA; Amstrad CPC and ZX Spectrum versions developed by Choice Software; Commodore 64 version developed by Ocean Software; Atari 7800 version developed by ITDC; Atari 8-bit version developed by Sculptured Software.)
- Publishers: Nintendo: 2600, 5200; Atari, Inc.; PC-88; Hudson Soft; Atari 8-bit, 7800; Atari Corporation; C64, CPC, ZX Spectrum; Ocean Software
- Director: Shigeru Miyamoto
- Producer: Gunpei Yokoi
- Designers: Shigeru Miyamoto; Gunpei Yokoi
- Composer: Yukio Kaneoka
- Series: Mario
- Platform: Arcade: NES, Atari 2600, Atari 5200, FM-7, PC-88, Amstrad CPC, Commodore 64, ZX Spectrum, Famicom Disk System, Atari 7800, Atari 8-bit, Nintendo e-Reader, Game Boy Advance
- Release: March 1983: Arcade; NA: late March 1983 (Note: The original release date falls somewhere between 25 and 27 of that same month.); JP: June 21, 1983 (Note: Sources for the Japanese release date are conflicting and list it as somewhere between June and July 1983.); NES; JP: September 9, 1983; NA: June 1986; EU: 1986; 2600; December 1983; 5200; February 1984; FM-7, PC-88, PC-8001; JP: 1984; C64, CPC, ZX Spectrum; EU: 1987; Famicom Disk System; JP: November 30, 1988; 7800; December 1988; Atari 8-bit; Mid-1989; e-Reader; NA: November 11, 2002; Game Boy Advance; JP: May 21, 2004
- Genre: Platform
- Modes: Single-player, multiplayer

Mario Bros. (Note: Japanese: マリオブラザーズ, Hepburn: Mario Burazāzu) is a 1983 platform game developed and published by Nintendo for arcades. It was designed by Shigeru Miyamoto and Gunpei Yokoi, Nintendo's chief engineer. Players control Italian twin brother plumbers Mario and Luigi as they exterminate turtle-like creatures, giant flies, and crabs emerging from the sewers of New York City by knocking them upside-down and kicking them away. The Famicom/NES version was the first game to be developed by Intelligent Systems. It is part of the Mario franchise and the first spin-off of the Donkey Kong series.

The arcade and Famicom/NES versions were received positively by critics. Elements introduced in Mario Bros., such as floating coins, enemy turtles, and Luigi, were carried over to Super Mario Bros. (1985) and became staples of the Mario series.

An updated version, titled Mario Bros. Classic, is included as a minigame in all of the Super Mario Advance series and Mario & Luigi: Superstar Saga (2003). The NES version of Mario Bros. was re-released through the Wii and Wii U's Virtual Console, as well as the Nintendo Classics service for the Nintendo Switch. The original arcade version was released by Hamster Corporation as part of the Arcade Archives series for the Switch in 2017.

== Gameplay ==
Mario is about to defeat a Shellcreeper, in the arcade version.

Mario Bros. features two plumbers, Italian brothers Mario and Luigi, having to investigate the sewers of New York after strange creatures have been appearing down there. The objective of the game is to defeat all of the enemies in each phase, using only running and jumping.

Unlike subsequent Mario games, players cannot jump on enemies to squash them, until they are already flipped on their back. Each phase consists of a series of platforms with pipes at each corner of the screen, along with an object called a "POW" block in the center. The screen uses wraparound, so characters that go off to one side reappear on the opposite side. Points are scored for defeating enemies and collecting the bonus coins that emerge from the pipes afterward.

Enemies are defeated by kicking them over once they have been flipped on their back. This is accomplished by hitting the platform the enemy is on directly beneath them. If the player allows too much time to pass after doing this the enemy will flip itself back over and recover. Four types of enemies emerge from the pipes: Shellcreeper; Sidestepper; Fighter Fly, which moves by jumping and can only be flipped when it is touching a platform; and Slipice, which turns platforms into slippery ice. Fireballs float around the screen instead of sticking to platforms. The "POW" block flips all enemies touching a platform or the floor when activated, but can only be used three times before disappearing. In later rounds, icicles form on the underside of platforms and fall all the way to the bottom of the screen. One life is lost whenever the player touches an un-flipped enemy, fireball, or fully formed icicle. The game ends when all lives are lost.

The game contains bonus stages where the goal is to collect coins before a timer expires.

== Development ==
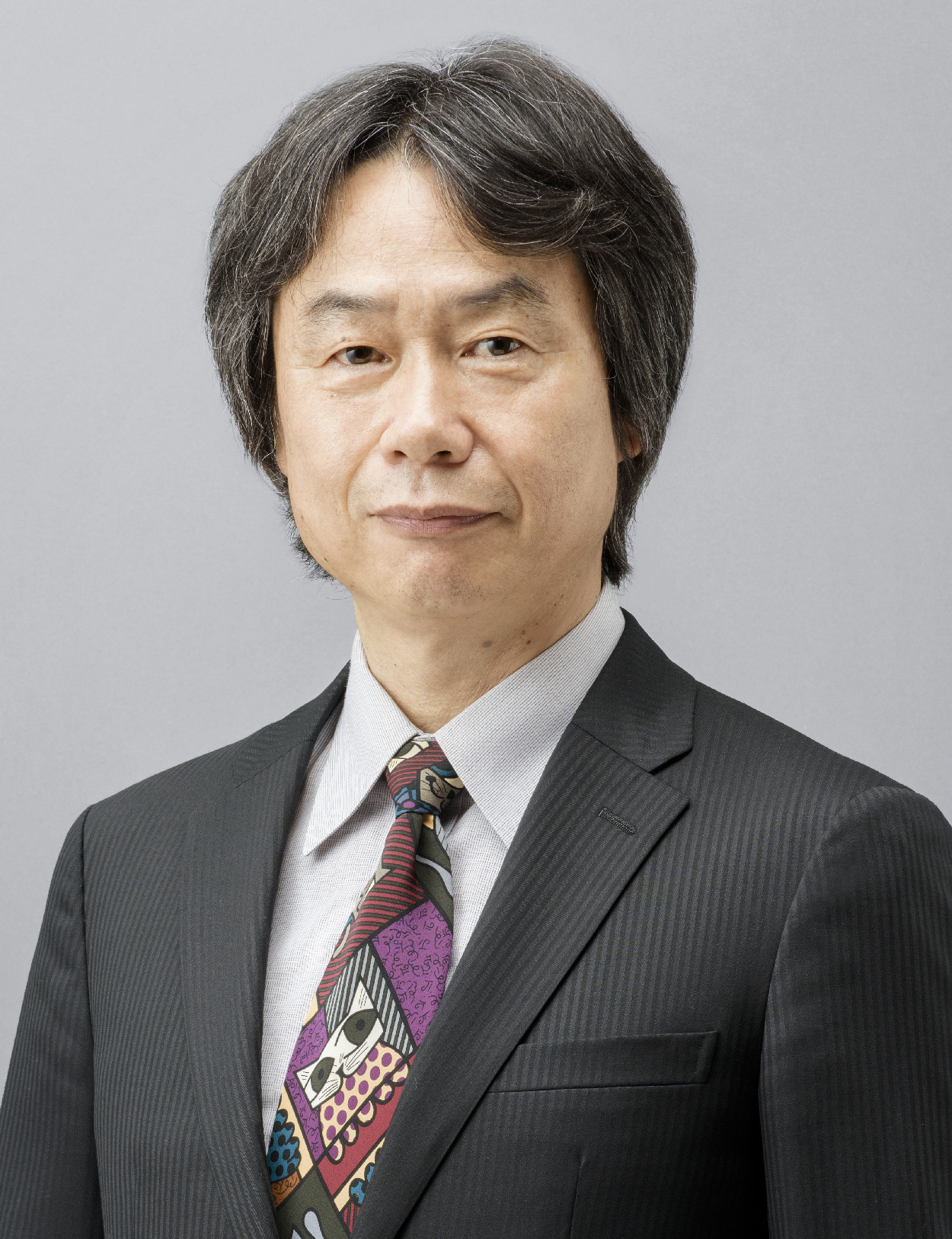
Shigeru Miyamoto (pictured) and Gunpei Yokoi collaborated on the design of Mario Bros.

Mario Bros. was created by Shigeru Miyamoto and Gunpei Yokoi, two of the lead developers for Donkey Kong (1981). In Donkey Kong, Mario dies if he falls too far. For Mario Bros., Yokoi suggested to Miyamoto that Mario should be able to fall from any height, which Miyamoto hesitantly thought would make it "not much of a game". He eventually agreed on some superhuman abilities. He designed a prototype that had Mario "jumping and bouncing around", which he was satisfied with. Yokoi suggested combating enemies from below, observing that it would work because there are multiple floors, but this proved too easy in gameplay, which the developers fixed by requiring the enemies to be touched after flipping. This was also how they introduced the turtle as an enemy that could only be hit from below. Because of Mario's appearance in Donkey Kong with overalls, a hat, and a thick moustache, and because Mario Bros. has a large network of giant pipes, Miyamoto changed Mario's occupation from carpenter to plumber. The game's music was composed by Yukio Kaneoka.

A popular story of how Mario went from Jumpman to Mario is that an Italian American landlord, Mario Segale, had barged in on Nintendo of America (NoA)'s staff to demand rent, and they decided to rename Jumpman after him. This story is contradicted by former NoA warehouse manager Don James, who has stated that he and NoA president Minoru Arakawa named the character after Segale as a joke because Segale was so reclusive that none of the employees had ever met him.

Miyamoto set the game in subterranean New York City due to what he called its "labyrinthine network of sewage pipes". The pipes were inspired by several manga, which he said feature waste grounds with pipes lying around. In this game, they are used to allow the enemies to enter and exit the stage neatly, to avoid them piling up on the bottom of the stage. The green coloring of the pipes, which Nintendo's late president Satoru Iwata called an uncommon color, came from Miyamoto having a limited color palette and wanting to keep things colorful. He added that two shades of green combine well.

Mario Bros. introduced Mario's brother, Luigi, who was created for the multiplayer mode by doing a palette swap of Mario. The two-player mode and several aspects of gameplay were inspired by Joust. To date, Mario Bros. has been released for more than a dozen platforms. The first movement from Mozart's Eine kleine Nachtmusik is used at the start of the game. This song has been used in later video games, including Dance Dance Revolution: Mario Mix and Super Smash Bros. Brawl.

== Release ==
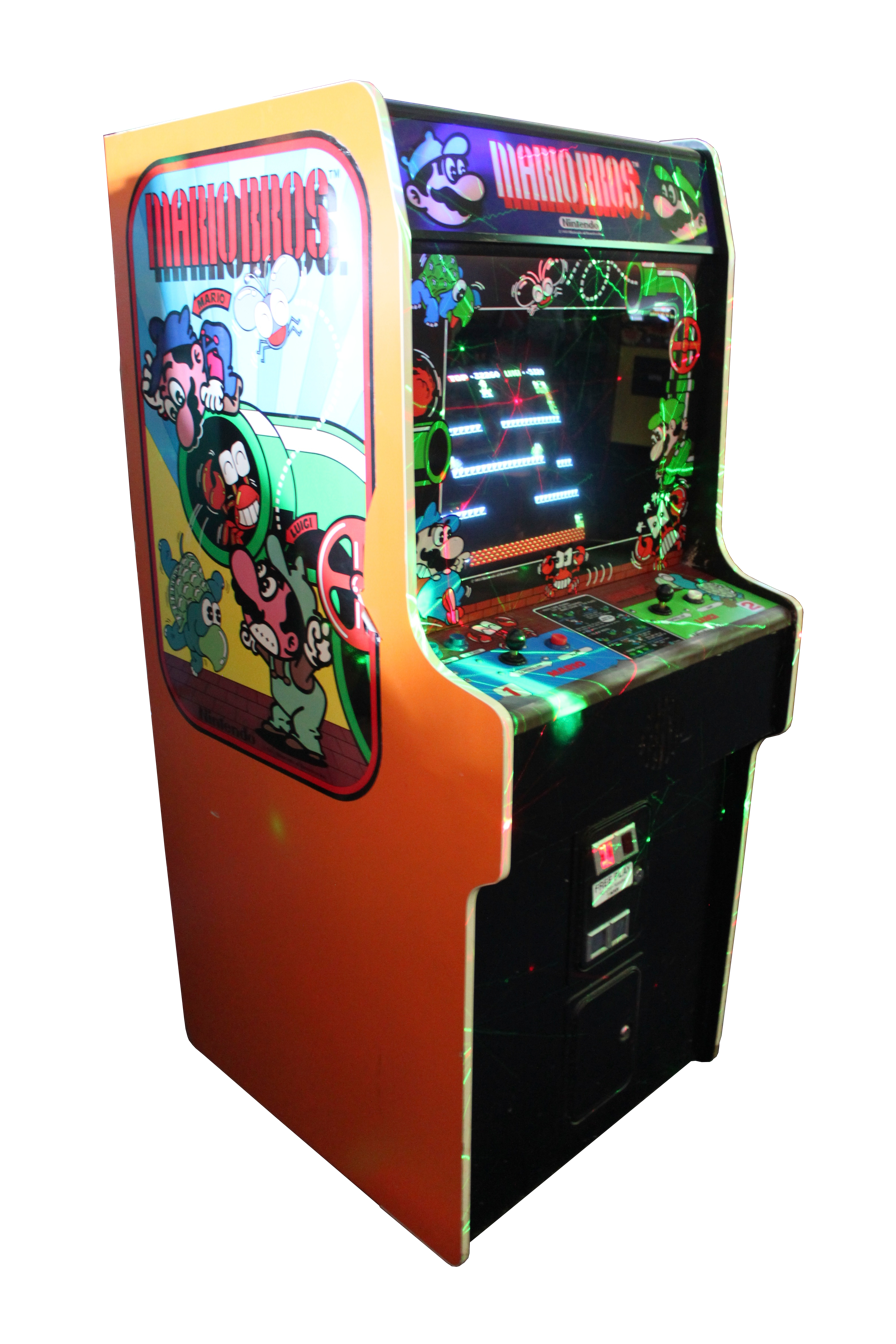
Upright arcade cabinet

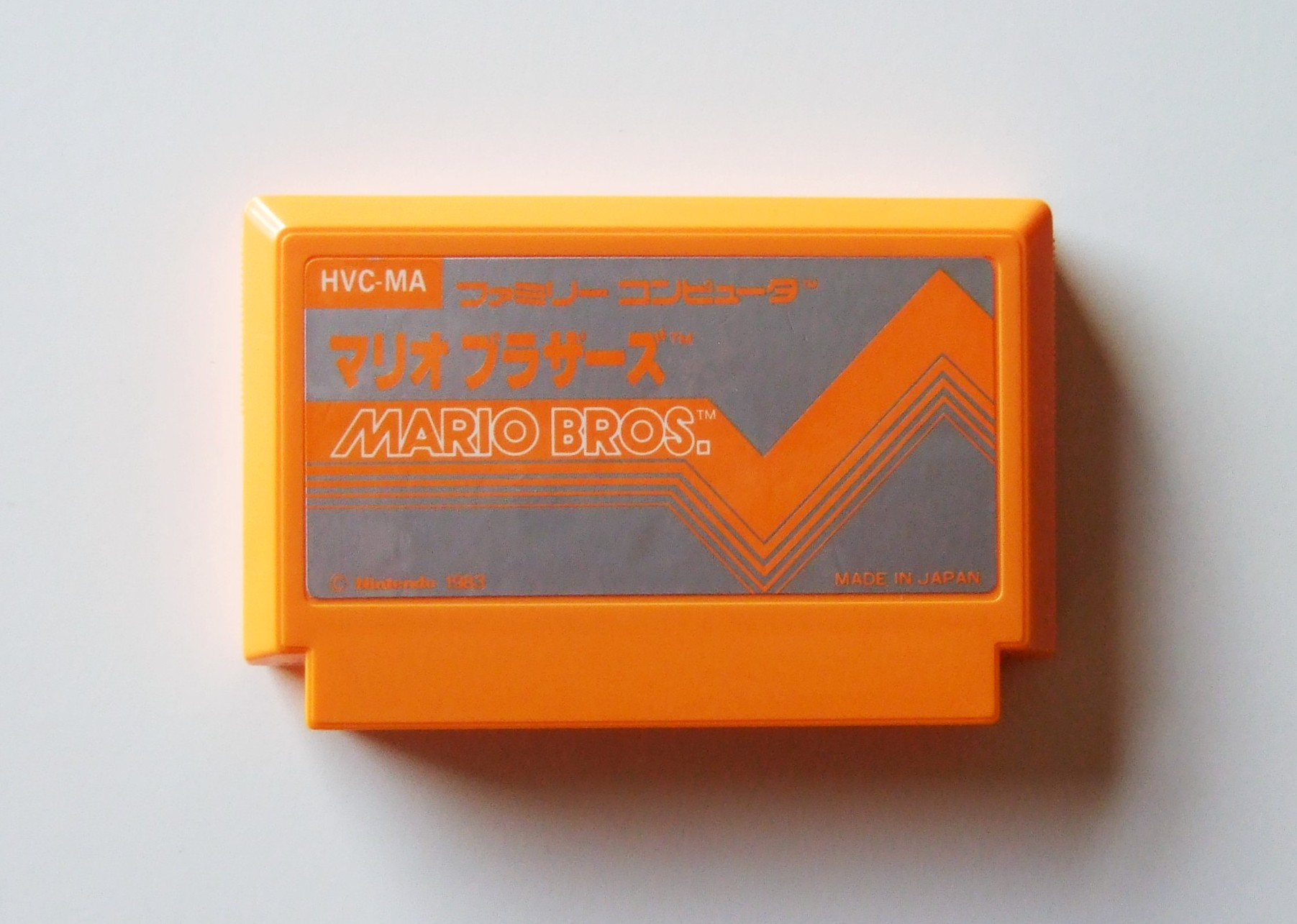
Famicom cartridge

Following its release in arcades, Mario Bros. was ported to several home console platforms.

Game Machine magazine reported that the game made its North American debut at the Amusement & Music Operators Association show during March 25–27, 1983, and entered mass production in Japan on June 21. The book Arcade TV Game List (2006), authored by Masumi Akagi and published by the Amusement News Agency, lists the release dates as March 1983 in North America and June 1983 in Japan. However, Nintendo president Satoru Iwata said in a 2013 Nintendo Direct presentation that the game was released in Japan on July 14, 1983.

Upon release, Mario Bros. was initially labeled as being the third game in the Donkey Kong series. For home video game conversions, Nintendo held the rights to the game in Japan, while licensing the overseas rights to Atari, Inc.

=== Other versions ===
Mario Bros. was ported by other companies to the Atari 2600, Atari 5200, Atari 8-bit computers, Atari 7800, Amstrad CPC, and ZX Spectrum. The two versions for Commodore 64 are an unreleased Atarisoft version, and a 1986 version by Ocean Software. The Atari 8-bit computer version by Sculptured Software is the only home port which includes the falling icicles. An Apple II version was made, but never commercially released.

A version by Nintendo and Intelligent Systems for the Famicom/Nintendo Entertainment System was released in Japan on September 9, 1983, followed by North America in June 1986. Another NES version was released exclusively in Europe in 1993 as part of the Classic Series. A version for NEC's PC-8001, unrelated to the Hudson Soft-developed Mario Bros. Special and Punch Ball Mario Bros., was developed by MISA and published by Westside Soft House in 1984. A modified version for the Famicom Disk System, titled Kaettekita Mario Bros., (Note: Japanese: 帰ってきたマリオブラザーズ, Hepburn: Kaette kita Mario Burazāzu; lit. The Return of the Mario Bros.) was released only in Japan on November 30, 1988, through the Disk Writer service. This version featured product placement from Japanese food company Nagatanien, with cutscenes advertising various food products.

In Taiwan and Mainland China, the game is sometimes nicknamed as Pipeline (管道) or Mr. Mary (瑪莉) due to the fact that counterfeits were distributed widely.

The NES version of Mario Bros. was ported via the Virtual Console service in North America, Australia, Europe, and Japan for the Wii, Nintendo 3DS, and Wii U. The original arcade version of Mario Bros. was released in September 2017 for the Nintendo Switch as part of the Arcade Archives series. The NES version is one of the first games to have been added to the Nintendo Classics service on the Switch.

Nintendo included Mario Bros. as a bonus in several releases, including Super Mario Bros. 3 in the form of a two-player minigame, as a single-player mode in the Game Boy Advance's Super Mario Advance series, and in Mario & Luigi: Superstar Saga. The NES version is in a piece of furniture in Animal Crossing for the GameCube, along with many other NES games, though this one requires the use of a Nintendo e-Reader and a North America-exclusive e-Card.

In 2004, Namco released an arcade cabinet containing Donkey Kong, Donkey Kong Jr., and Mario Bros. under license from Nintendo. The latter was altered for the vertical screen used by the other games, with the visible play area cropped on the sides.

== Reception ==
Reception

Review scores
Publication	Score			
Publication	Atari 2600	GBA	NES	Wii
AllGame			4.5/5	
Computer and Video Games	82%		83%	
GameSpot				4.9/10
IGN		6/10 (e-Reader)		4.5/10
Mean Machines			80%	
Power Unlimited			80%	

Mario Bros. was initially a modest success in arcades, with an estimated 2,000 arcade cabinets sold in the United States by July 1983. It became highly successful in American arcades.

In Japan, Game Machine listed Mario Bros. as the third most successful new table arcade unit of July 1983. In the United States, Nintendo sold 3,800 Mario Bros. arcade cabinets. The arcade cabinets have since become mildly rare. The arcade game was not affected by its release during the video game crash of 1983. Video game author Dave Ellis considers it one of the more memorable classic games. In Japan, more than 1.63 million copies of the Famicom version of Mario Bros. have been sold, and more than 90,000 copies of the Famicom Mini re-release.

The Nintendo Entertainment System (NES) version had 2.28 million cartridges sold worldwide. The Atari 2600 version's sales of 1.59 million cartridges made it one of the bestselling games of 1983. This brings total Atari 2600, NES, and Famicom Mini cartridge sales to 3.96 million units sold worldwide.

The NES and Atari versions of Mario Bros. received positive reviews from Computer and Video Games in 1989. They said the NES version is "incredibly good fun" especially in two-player mode, the Atari VCS version is "just as much fun" but with graphical restrictions, and the Atari 7800 version is slightly better.

The 2009 Virtual Console re-release of the NES version later received mixed reviews, but received positive reviews from gamers. In a review of the Virtual Console release, GameSpot criticized the NES version for being a poor arcade conversion that retains all of the technical flaws found in this version. IGN complimented the Virtual Console version's gameplay, even though it was critical of Nintendo's decision to release an "inferior" NES version on the Virtual Console. IGN also agreed on the issue of the number of ports. They said that since most people have Mario Bros. on one of the Super Mario Advance games, this version is not worth 500 Wii Points. The Nintendo e-Reader version of Mario Bros. was slightly better received by IGN, who praised the gameplay, but criticized it for lack of multiplayer and for not being worth the purchase because of the Super Mario Advance versions.

The Super Mario Advance releases and Mario & Luigi: Superstar Saga all featured the same version of Mario Bros. (titled Mario Bros. Classic). The mode was first included in Super Mario Advance, and was praised for its simplicity and entertainment value. IGN called this mode fun in its review of Super Mario World: Super Mario Advance 2, but complained that it would have been nice if the developers had come up with a new game to replace it.

Their review of Yoshi's Island: Super Mario Advance 3 criticizes it more than in the review of Super Mario Advance 2 because Nintendo chose not to add multiplayer to any of the mini-games found in that game, sticking instead with an identical version of the Mario Bros. game found in previous versions. GameSpot's review of Super Mario Advance 4: Super Mario Bros. 3 calls it a throwaway feature that could have simply been removed. Other reviewers were not as negative on the feature's use in later Super Mario Advance games. Though it was criticized in most Super Mario Advance games, a GameSpy review praised the version within Super Mario Advance 2 in multi-player because it only requires at least two Game Boy Advances, one copy of the game, and a link cable.

== Legacy ==
Mario Clash (1995) is on the Virtual Boy.

In 1984, Hudson Soft made two different games based on Mario Bros. Mario Bros. Special (Note: Japanese: マリオブラザーズスペシャル, Hepburn: Mario Burazāzu Supesharu) is a reimagining with new phases and gameplay. Punch Ball Mario Bros. (Note: Japanese: パンチボールマリオブラザーズ, Hepburn: Panchi Bōru Mario Burazāzu) includes a new gameplay mechanic: punching small balls to stun enemies. Both games were released for the PC-6001mkII, PC-8001mkII, PC-8801, FM-7, and Sharp X1.

A version was announced alongside the Virtual Boy console at Nintendo Space World 1994. Footage showed a faithful recreation, though with the Virtual Boy's signature graphical qualities of monochrome red and black graphics and a slight stereoscopic 3D effect. Its demonstration was generally poorly received by video game publications, which lamented the selection of a decade-old game to demonstrate the technology of the new Virtual Boy hardware. Mario Bros. VB was never released, but some gameplay concepts were utilized in Mario Clash (1995).

Super Mario 3D World for the Wii U contains Luigi Bros., starring Luigi. This version, based on the NES version and included as a part of 2013's Year of Luigi celebrations, replaces Mario with Luigi in his modern color scheme; the second player's sprite retains the original Luigi colors. On October 16, 2015, Steve Kleisath obtained the world record for the arcade version at 5,424,920 points verified by Twin Galaxies.

== See also ==
- List of video games featuring Mario
- List of Luigi video games
