= Classic Series (NES) =

Marketing label by Nintendo

- Emblem as used in Germany
- Genre: Various
- Developer: Nintendo
- Publisher: Nintendo
- Platform: Nintendo Entertainment System
- First release: Donkey Kong Classics; Late-1992
- Latest release: Zelda II: The Adventure of Link; 1993

The Classic Series was a marketing label used by Nintendo in Europe and North America from 1992 onwards to describe a line of budget range rereleases of NES video games. Games released as part of the label were sold at a lower price, usually around half that of other NES titles (i.e. $29.99 instead of $49.99 in the United States or DM 44.95 instead of DM 94.95 in Germany). Club Nintendo Magazine promoted the games with the slogan "Good toys never go out of style".

== History ==
Despite the NES's successor SNES already releasing either one or two years before the introduction of the label (depending on the region), Nintendo's then-Vice President of Marketing Peter Main claimed the reason for its introduction to be "ensur[ing] that these timeless classics are available to new NES owners as well as to the millions of current owners who missed purchasing them the first time around", citing the fact that the NES was projected to still sell four million units in 1992 alone.

After its fairly limited runtime from late 1992 throughout 1993, the label inspired the similarly named Super Classic Series (called Player's Choice in North America) on the SNES in 1996, which was then rebranded to Nintendo Selects in 2011.

== Branding ==
From left to right: Original American box art, Classic Series European box art, Classic Series American box art

The way each title was shown to be part of the label varied between European and North American releases.

The former mostly reused the respective game's original packaging (including box art and manuals) with only the small addition of a golden emblem showing Mario in a top hat with "Nintendo Entertainment System" written in a circle around him. Below is a ribbon, the color of which varies, displaying the "Classic Series" name. Sometimes, the original box art in its 3:2 aspect ratio is drawn onto a solid color in a 3:5 ratio in order to unify the size of game cases.

In North America, cartridge labels and box art were redesigned to feature a red header reading "Nintendo Entertainment System - Classic Series" as well as an emblem resembling a tilted square consisting of dashed lines and the words "The Original". The packaging of Metroid specifically was redesigned to mimic that of the Game Boy game Metroid II: Return of Samus in an attempt to cross-promote the games and strengthen the Metroid brand image.

== Titles ==
The label was used in three of the Nintendo Entertainment System's game regions, those being NES-NOE (only referring to reunified Germany after 1991), NES-FRA (Metropolitan France, Belgium, the Netherlands and Luxembourg) and NES-USA (United States).

Game	Release		
Game	NES-NOE	NES-FRA	NES-USA
Donkey Kong Classics	No	Yes	No
Ice Hockey	Yes	No	No
Mario Bros.	Yes	No	No
Metroid	No	No	Yes
Pinball	Yes	No	No
Punch-Out!!	No	No	Yes
Soccer	Yes	Yes	No
Super Mario Bros. 3	Yes	Yes	No
Tennis	Yes	No	No
The Legend of Zelda	No	Yes	Yes
Zelda II: The Adventure of Link	No	Yes	Yes

The Classic Series rerelease of Mario Bros. is particularly notable, as it not only features completely redesigned packaging, art and a manual, but also actual differences in the programming, making it the only game in the lineup to do so. These differences include improved movement controls, graphical changes and the re-inclusion of cutscenes and enemies that were present in the Arcade version, but cut in the 1986 NES release. It was also the only NES-NOE Classic Series game to be released in August 1993, four months after all other games using the label.
