= Piano Tiles =

2014 video game

- Developers: Hu Wen Zeng; Umoni Studio
- Publisher: Kooapps
- Platforms: iOS, Android, Windows Phone
- Release: 28 March 2014
- Genre: Action
- Mode: Single-player

Piano Tiles (known on iOS as Piano Tiles – Don't Tap the White Tile and on Android as Don't Tap the White Tile) is a single-player mobile game launched on 28 March 2014 by Umoni Studio, specifically by creator Hu Wen Zeng. In late April 2014 the game was the most downloaded application on both the iOS and Android platforms. In early July it was released for Windows Phone.

A sequel, Piano Tiles 2, was created by Hu Wen Zeng and launched by Cheetah Mobile on 19 August 2015. The game received a Red Dot award in game design in 2016. However, it was taken offline in February 2020 due to allegations of fraud against Cheetah Mobile. The Piano Tiles series has been published by Kooapps since 2023. Two years later, Piano Tiles 2 was released on Apple Arcade, giving subscribers access to the game with exclusive features and ad-free gameplay.

In August 2025, the game celebrated its 10th anniversary with a special in-game event called "Tree of Melodies".

== Gameplay ==
Piano Tiles is a game where the player's objective is to tap on the black tiles as they appear from the top of the screen while avoiding the white tiles. When each black tile is tapped, it will emit a piano sound. The player loses the game if they tap on a white tile.

The game contains six modes: Classic, Arcade, Zen, Rush, Arcade+ (which includes the Bomb, Lightning, Bilayer, and Double tiles), and Relay.
