= Hermann Necke =

German composer, conductor and pianist

- Necke, as published in the Christmas 1910 edition of The Etude
- Born: 8 November 1850; Wiehe, Thuringia, Kingdom of Prussia
- Died: 15 February 1912 (aged 61); Leipzig, Kingdom of Saxony, German Empire
- Occupations: Concert pianist; Concert violinist; Conductor; Composer; Music director
- Organizations: Dürener Männergesangverein; Feuerwehrkapelle Düren; Städtischekapelle Düren

Hermann Necke (8 November 1850 – 15 February 1912) was a German composer, conductor, music director, pianist, and violinist of the Romantic period. He is best known for the galop Csikós Post, first published in 1895 as part of Klänge aus Ungarn [Sounds from Hungary], Opus 286.

While seldom heard today, Necke's prolific output of songs, choruses, and instrumental works (upwards of 400 opus numbers) was well-known during his lifetime.

== Life ==
=== Early years ===
Necke was brought up in Wiehe, and his initial education was "conducted under the guidance of several able teachers in Germany." His desire to become a composer stemmed from a young age.

=== Musical career ===
Necke's compositions were quick to attract multiple publishers. His first known published works, appearing in 1873, were a galop and rheinländer for brass band.

Necke led several singing societies, most notably the Dürener Männergesangverein [Düren Men's Singing Society] from 1877 to 1895. The Dürener Männergesangverein was founded on September 6, 1877 by members of a similar group when the disagreeable personality of a newly elected conductor caused many to resign. According to Hildegard von Radzibor (1969, p. 76), the association's sole purpose as laid out by Necke was to revive and improve men's singing in a convivial manner through weekly meetings and practical exercise; to accomplish this, the Männergesangverein put on numerous private and public performances.

Around the same time as the Dürener Männergesangverein's founding, Necke also took over management of the Düren fire brigade choir (soon to become the town's municipal chapel choir). His tenure here lasted until retirement in 1910 and was very well-received, being described as vital towards establishing the choir as a semi-renowned group. The Stadttheater Düren opened in 1907 under his watch.

Starting in 1884, Necke began to organize larger "Liedertafel" concerts that invited figures such as composer-pianist Franz Litterscheid. These concerts also saw Necke perform as a pianist and violinist, his repertoire on the latter including Henri Vieuxtemps' Ballade et polonaise de concert and Charles Auguste de Bériot's violin concerti. After his retirement in 1910, the concerts were taken over by E. Jos. Müller and Ad. Bauer until their discontinuation in 1918.

== Music ==
=== Reception ===
Necke's compositions were said to have been immediately popular and continued to have a large following in both Germany and the United States. In fact, it was an American magazine—The Etude—that described his music as "marked by a vein of pleasing originality."
