= Pikmin Finder =

Defunct 2023 mobile browser game

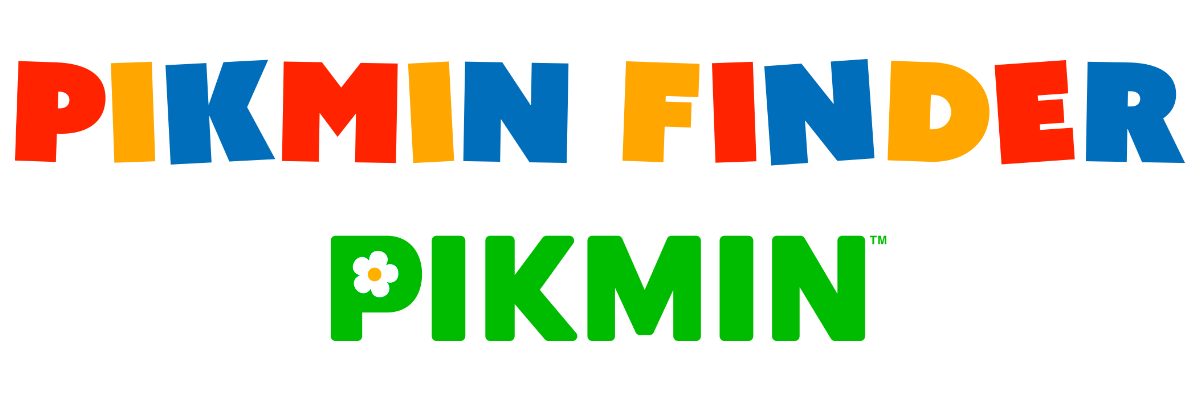
- Developers: Nintendo; Niantic (Note: The game is powered by Niantic's subsidiary 8th Wall, using their development platform.)
- Publisher: Nintendo
- Series: Pikmin
- Platform: Web Browser
- Release: WW: September 1, 2023
- Genre: Augmented reality
- Mode: Single-player

Pikmin Finder was a 2023 augmented reality browser-based mobile game in the Pikmin series. It is the second mobile game in the Pikmin franchise, following Pikmin Bloom. Developed and published by Nintendo using Niantic's 8th Wall development platform, the game involves using the player's mobile camera to display Pikmin and command them to carry treasure back to the player.

The game was distributed worldwide on September 1, 2023, to coincide with a Nintendo Live event in Seattle, Washington. The game was noted as being rather short by critics, with many deeming the game as being just a fun diversion. Finder was shut down on December 31, 2024.

== Gameplay ==
A group of Pikmin have brought back a treasure for the player to collect and view.

Pikmin Finder is an augmented reality (AR) mobile game, utilising AR gameplay similar to that seen in the 2021 mobile game Pikmin Bloom. The player uses their mobile phone's camera to locate and view Pikmin in the surrounding environment. At first, the player will find Pikmin sprouted in the ground that can be pulled out by swiping up on the phone screen. Once enough are plucked out of the ground, the player can send the Pikmin away to collect and return treasure. The player repeats this until the player collects all the treasure in their catalogue. The phone's camera can be used to take pictures with the Pikmin in the environment.

The game features all the types of Pikmin that can be found in Pikmin 4, as well as Oatchi, but it depends on time of day and location to determine which types show up. The treasures are also the same as the ones found in that game too, with twenty treasures for the player to collect.

== Development and release ==
Following questions made by The Verge, a Niantic representative stated that Finder was developed by Nintendo with the assistance of the Niantic subsidiary 8th Wall, using their web-based development platform. Niantic had previously worked on the Pikmin series in the past with 2021's Pikmin Bloom. The game was originally released to coincide with Nintendo Live in Seattle, Washington, with gameplay geared specifically to those attending the event, as well as to promote the recently released Pikmin 4. The game was designed to be easy to allow for easier play whilst waiting for events or in stores, with one of the aspects being not needing to download the game in order to play it. At both Nintendo Live and official Nintendo stores such as Nintendo Tokyo, guests received cards labelled with QR code URLs to access the game. The game was made available worldwide on all browsers using either the game's link on mobile or a QR code on the desktop version. On December 31, 2024, Nintendo announced on the game's webpage that its services had been discontinued.

== Reception ==
Critics noted that whilst the game was novel in concept, many pointed out the game's extremely short length, with Engadget and Nintendo Life deeming it "harmless fun" and "mostly good for passing time than serious gaming". Wes Davis from The Verge felt that the game came up short and described it as being "a digital AR game equivalent of a fidget spinner". Furthermore he described the game as being a "cute, distilled version" of Pikmin Bloom, mentioning it was good for only a "couple minutes of diversion". Comparatively, Victoria Kennedy of Eurogamer described the game as being "charming, but simplful", commenting that she found the game "rather delightful". Gaming Bolt's Shunal Doke described the gameplay as "rather simplistic" and deemed it nothing more than an advertisement for the recently released Pikmin 4. Kieron Verbrugge from Press Start noted the game as being a "fun diversion" but acknowledged the game's accessibility due to being available on browser, though they stated the quality of your images is down to the player's photography abilities and camera quality. Hideaki Fujiwara from Automaton Media felt that while the game was meant solely to kill time while waiting, he added that the AR technology was put to good use and was "a glimpse of Niantic's proactive attitude towards expanding AR functions".
