= Oatchi =

Fictional character from Pikmin 4

- Pikmin character
- Oatchi as he appeared in Pikmin 4 (2023)
- First game: Pikmin 4 (2023)
- Created by: Yuji Kando

In-universe information
- Species: Space Dog
- Gender: Male
- Origin: Giya

Oatchi (Japanese: オッチン, Hepburn: Otchin) is a character who first appeared in Nintendo's 2023 real-time strategy video game Pikmin 4 for the Nintendo Switch. Oatchi, a breed of a bipedal alien species resembling dogs dubbed "Space Dog", is a member of the Rescue Corps; a group of intergalactic individuals tasked with rescuing space adventurers who have become stranded. Oatchi is one of the two playable characters in Pikmin 4's main story and is partnered up with the player character to explore the Pikmin planet to rescue reoccurring series protagonist Captain Olimar after he crash landed on planet PNF-404.

In Pikmin 4, Oatchi can be commanded by the player to perform tasks to aid in exploring such as destroying obstacles, carrying items and defeating enemies. Oatchi can also function as transport for both the player and the titular Pikmin. These abilities can be upgraded as the player progresses through the game. Additionally, Oatchi can function as a second captain, meaning he can command his own squad of Pikmin which can be used for puzzle solving.

Several media publications have given Oatchi praise for his adorable appearance as well as his adaptability and usefulness in the game, with some declaring that it was hard to go back to previous installments due to the lack of Oatchi. Critics labelled Oatchi as one of the best video game characters of 2023.

== Character design ==
An image that demonstrates the visual differences between Oatchi (right) and Moss (left). Compared to Oatchi, Moss is significantly larger and has a dark green coat of fur. Additionally, Oatchi has a dandelion seedhead at the end of his tail whereas Moss has a leaf instead.

Oatchi is a "Space Dog", a bipedal alien species that resembles the appearance of a dog. He has a yellow coat of fur, a tail with a white furry ball at the end that resembles a dandelion's seedhead, and lacks a visible nose. The character is also commonly depicted with a red collar. (Note: Though his collar colour can change depending on the spacesuit colour the player picks.) His appearance varies slightly in comparison to another Space Dog that appears in Pikmin 4: Moss, a larger green dog-like creature with a leaf growing on its tail who lives on the Pikmin planet and is capable of using the same abilities as Oatchi. In the game's story, Moss acts as an opponent to the player and Oatchi, who kidnaps castaways along with the protagonist Captain Olimar. Oatchi is a type of Space Dog known as a Rescue Pup, a breed raised on the planet Giya. Giya is home to the Shepherd family, a generational line of Rescue Corps captains who have raised Oatchi's breeds for generations.

The character of Oatchi was created as a result of the series' low sales, causing developers to consider ideas for a unique selling point for Pikmin 4 that grabbed people's attention and impacted the game's overall gameplay. In interviews, Pikmin 4 co-director Yuji Kando mentioned how during the early stages of the game's development, himself and other developers toyed with a prototype that allowed the player to control a recurring enemy known as a Bulborb. With this mechanic the player would be able to use the enemy to consume Pikmin, which developers believed would simple to control, be visually striking and give satisfaction to the player. Kando added that they tried to develop ways for the player to control or possess enemies, mentioning Cappy from Super Mario Odyssey as an inspiration, but according to Kando "it was difficult to come up with something that fit the world of Pikmin." As development furthered, developers considered the possibility of being able to control various creatures as well as letting the player ride them, however Kando commented that it had become difficult to connect everything into a coherent game. Developers started to find it difficult to justify having the player control an enemy, so they instead tried to have a character be more associated with the game's narrative of rescuing Olimar. The idea of "rescue dogs" came to mind with developers, which lead to the decision to add Oatchi as a partner to the player character. Kando spoke about how the creation of Oatchi became the starting point in getting the game's narrative and mechanics to come together, giving an example of how the idea of Oatchi being a rescue dog lead to the creation of the Rescue Corp. Pikmin 4 designer and writer Yutaka Hiramuki noted in an interview with 4Gamer.net that Oatchi also led to the creation of Moss as an opponent in the game's Dandori Battles. (Note: Dandori is a Japanese word that describes a person's ability to strategically organise tasks and work effectively to execute plans.) He mentioned that this led to additions to the narrative to explain the two similar dog-like creatures in the game, which gave Oatchi a greater presence in the game.

Oatchi was developed to have two different aspects to his gameplay; a "Super Pikmin" side where he has the power of ten Pikmin when fighting or carrying an object, and a playable character side where Oatchi can operate separately from the player character and can command his own Pikmin. Hiramuki stated that developers chose a dog to allow his incorporation into the game's narrative as a Rescue Corps member in order to sniff out castaways, as well to train the player to increase Oatchi's utilities such as transport. Hiramuki added that during development, adjustments were made to maintain the balance between the abilities of Oatchi and the Pikmin. Kando mentioned that he was initially worried about the character making battles too easy, but later believed that Oatchi deepened the "strategic nature of the game" and coincided with the theme of Dandori as Oatchi was both controllable by the player and could also be ordered to do tasks independently.

== Appearances ==
=== Main appearance ===
Oatchi's first appearance is in the 2023 game Pikmin 4 as companion to the player character and secondary captain to the Pikmin. Oatchi is a Rescue Pup and member of the Rescue Corps, an intergalactic organisation tasked with helping stranded explorers, referred to in-game as "castaways". At the beginning of the game, the Rescue Corps sends out a team with Oatchi led by Captain Shephard, tasked with rescuing series protagonist Captain Olimar from the planet PNF-404. However, upon arrival to the planet the team crash land on the planet and are separated from each-other. The Rescue Corps proceed to task the player character, a new recruit to the organisation, with rescuing the now stranded team. Reaching PNF-404, the player character encounters and teams up with Oatchi to scout out the nearby members of the Rescue Corps team. Upon finding a colony of Pikmin near the Rescue Corps' ship, they cooperate with the player and Oatchi in exploring the planet and finding Captain Olimar.

Oatchi charging at a group of pots, breaking them in the process.

Oatchi can be commanded by the player to perform a variety of tasks similar to Pikmin; such as being able to carry objects, attacking enemies and breaking structures. However unlike Pikmin, Oatchi is also able to jump up small ledges, sniff out for objectives and resources and is able to carry both the player and Pikmin on his back. Additionally, Oatchi can be commanded to charge; either to travel more quickly for a short distance or to bash into breakable objects and enemies. Oatchi can be separated from the player to become the game's secondary captain. In this state, Oatchi is able to command and throw Pikmin to perform tasks, which is useful for multitasking and solving puzzles. Oatchi is able to gain new abilities such as swimming, as well as upgrade existing abilities using Pup Drives; points earned by completing tasks that can be exchanged with Captain Shephard.

Later in the game, the Rescue Corps are able to find and rescue Olimar. Trying to leave the planet and return home, the team realise Oatchi is unable to leave the surface of the planet due to an illness that sprouts a leaf on his tail (similar to the leaves on a Pikmin's head). Unable to leave, Oatchi and the player search for a cure for the illness. They find the necessary ingredients after defeating a giant dog-like creature, which has the DNA able to create a cure for Oatchi.

=== Other appearances ===
Oatchi has made cameo appearances in other instalments of the Pikmin series. To celebrate the release of the Pikmin 4 demo in June 2023, Niantic announced that players who have completed the demo would receive an Oatchi-based costume for the player's Mii in Pikmin Bloom. The character has also made an appearance in the 2023 browser-based mobile game Pikmin Finder. Outside of the Pikmin series, Oatchi appeared in Super Smash Bros. Ultimate in 2024 as a spirit, a collectable obtained by playing matches under certain conditions.

== Critical reception ==
Following his appearance in Pikmin 4, Oatchi garnered largely positive reception from critics, with publications such as IGN Japan, Nintendo Life and Destructoid declaring him as one of the best video game characters of 2023. Destructoid's Chris Carter added that Oatchi was "the [star] of the game" and was one of the most useful game mechanics he had seen. In his review of Pikmin 4, he felt that Oatchi completely changed how he approached the game and worked well with strategizing alongside the Pikmin, adding that Oatchi perfectly aligned with the game's philosophy of Dandori. When discussing Oatchi in IGN Japan's character awards for 2023, Takuya Watanabe commented that they thought he was reliable and memorable. They described how they firmly believed Oatchi had become an important character to the Pikmin series and may even be its new face.

Oatchi's appearance was a subject of discussion, with critics describing his appearances as being adorable and cute. ITmedia's Sadataro wrote how over the course of the game he was "completely smitten" by Oatchi's behaviour, noting how he felt better just by looking at him. He also praised Oatchi for his usefulness, which Sadataro claimed lowered the stress from leading the Pikmin during the game. Multiple editors expressed strong affection for Oatchi, with one describing Oatchi as being "shaped liked a friend". Writer Kelsey Raynor from VG247 wrote how they thought Oatchi was adorable, but commented that he looked bizarre and rather strange-looking due to his lack of a nose.

Another aspect of Oatchi that gained significant discussion is his abilities in Pikmin 4. Nintendo Life writer Jim Norman responded positively to the abilities, noting how Oatchi became his only form of transport in the game due to how efficient he was. Norman added he was excited to utilise Oatchi as a second captain, adding that he felt that Oatchi was the "pinnacle of Pikmin planning". Similarly, Willa Rowe mentioned how Oatchi's strength when riding him resulted in him being her main strategy for navigation. She noted how Oatchi's design and innovations to the series' formula "stole her heart". In his review for Pikmin 4, Famitsu writer Tonio Kunizaki noted how attached he became to Oatchi by the end of the game. He felt that once Oatchi had become fully upgraded, the master and servant dynamic between the player and Oatchi had switched, noting that he felt Oatchi was capable of almost anything. Hope Bellingham of GamesRadar+ welcomed the addition of Oatchi to the series and commented that riding on the back of Oatchi never got old. Bellingham wrote that while she was disappointed at the lack of ability to pet him, she was glad she was able to feed Oatchi treats.

Conversely, other critics believed Oatchi's inclusion in the game made him too powerful when facing obstacles. Writing for Real Sound [ja] (リアルサウンド), Takuya Watanabe stated that he believed Oatchi overshadowed both the protagonists and the Pikmin in 4, going further to mention that he believed the Pikmin in the game were an add-on due to Oatchi overshadowing and taking their role. Critics from both Real Sound and Eurogamer jokingly commented that the game should have been named after Oatchi instead of the Pikmin due to his ubiquitous role in the narrative. Eurogamer reported that players in the Pikmin community were devising "no-Oatchi" playthroughs of 4, with the article's author Liv Ngan believing challenges like these added a proper challenge to the game. Ngan notes the community was also attempting no Pikmin runs (also dubbed "Piklophobic" runs) which would emphasise the use of Oatchi and other in-game items significantly more, though she noted that these runs were attempted less often.

Upon the release of Pikmin 4, Oatchi received merchandise of his likeness. In July 2023, Japanese manufacturing company San-Ei Boeki announced a seven inch tall Oatchi plushie would be released on Amazon Japan the following September. Toy company Re-Ment revealed a range of Pikmin-themed terrarium figures in July 2024, of which Oatchi was one of the designs.
