= List of best-selling Wii U video games =

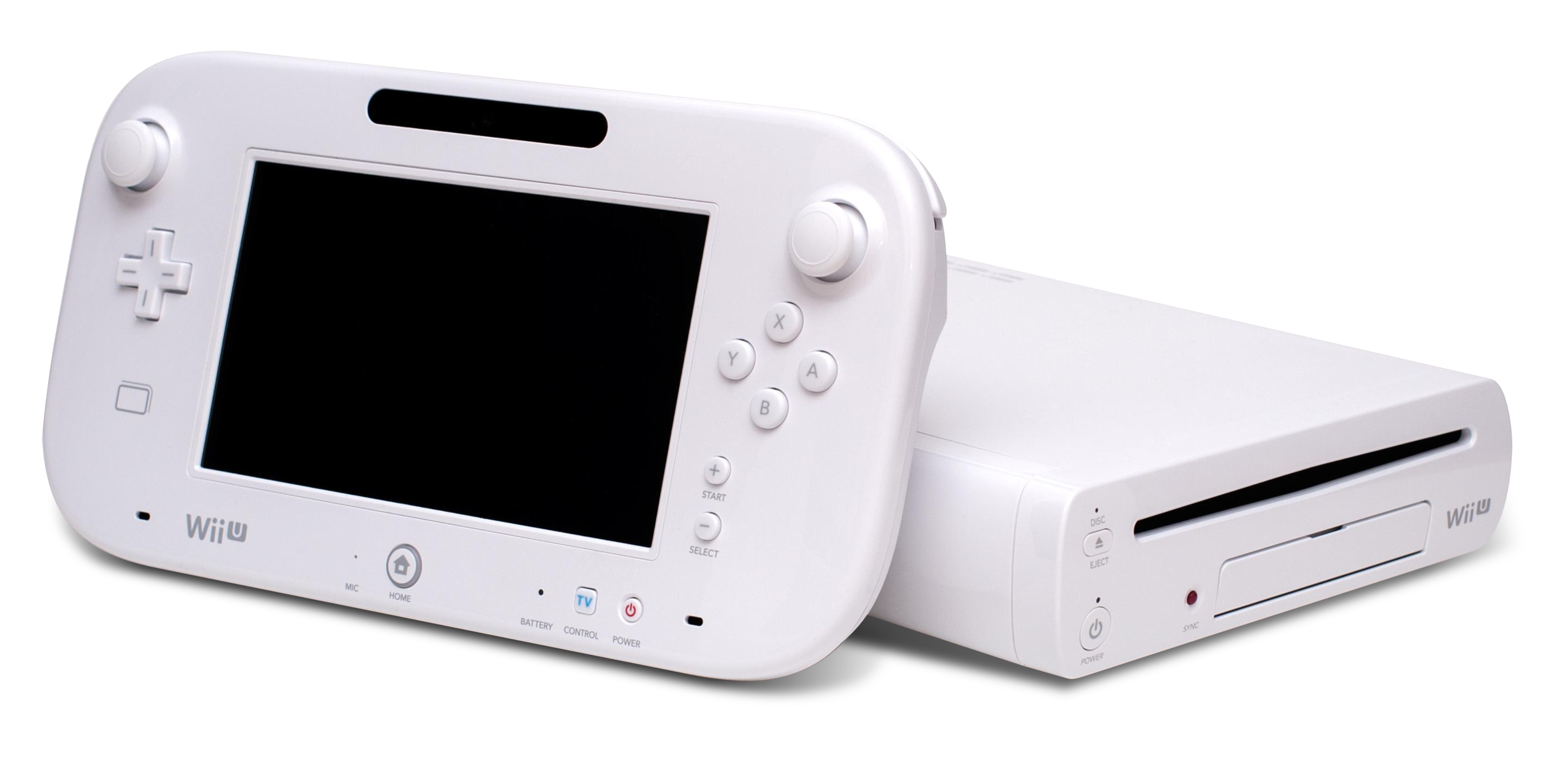
Wii U console with GamePad

This is a list of video games for the Wii U video game console that have sold or shipped at least one million copies. The best-selling game on the Wii U is Mario Kart 8. First released in Japan on May 29, 2014, it went on to sell over 8.4 million units worldwide.

There are a total of 20 Wii U games on this list which are confirmed to have sold or shipped at least one million units. Of these, 14 were developed by internal Nintendo development divisions. All of them were published in one or more regions by Nintendo.

By March 31, 2023, over 103.60 million total copies of games had been sold for the Wii U.

== List ==
†	Game was bundled with Wii U consoles during its lifetime

Game	Copies sold	As of	Release date (Note: Only the initial release date on this platform is listed.)	Developer(s)	Publisher(s)
Mario Kart 8 †	8.46 million	March 31, 2023	May 29, 2014	Nintendo EAD	Nintendo
Super Mario 3D World †	5.89 million	March 31, 2023	November 21, 2013	Nintendo EAD; 1-Up Studio	Nintendo
New Super Mario Bros. U †	5.82 million	March 31, 2023	November 18, 2012	Nintendo EAD	Nintendo
Super Smash Bros. for Wii U †	5.38 million	March 31, 2023	November 21, 2014	Sora Ltd.; Bandai Namco Studios	Nintendo
Nintendo Land †	5.21 million	March 31, 2023	November 18, 2012	Nintendo EAD	Nintendo
Splatoon †	4.95 million	March 31, 2023	May 28, 2015	Nintendo EAD	Nintendo
Super Mario Maker †	4.02 million	March 31, 2023	September 10, 2015	Nintendo EAD	Nintendo
New Super Luigi U †	3.07 million	March 31, 2023	June 19, 2013 (Note: Initial release was as downloadable content for New Super Mario Bros. U; a stand-alone retail version was released in the following months.)	Nintendo EAD	Nintendo
The Legend of Zelda: The Wind Waker HD †	2.37 million	March 31, 2023	September 20, 2013	Nintendo EAD	Nintendo
Mario Party 10	2.27 million	March 31, 2023	March 12, 2015	NDcube; Nintendo SPD	Nintendo
Donkey Kong Country: Tropical Freeze	2.02 million	December 31, 2020	February 13, 2014	Retro Studios	Nintendo
Wii Party U †	1.79 million	December 31, 2020	October 25, 2013	NDcube; Nintendo SPD	Nintendo
The Legend of Zelda: Breath of the Wild	1.70 million	December 31, 2020	March 3, 2017	Nintendo EPD	Nintendo
Yoshi's Woolly World	1.57 million	December 31, 2020	June 25, 2015	Good-Feel	Nintendo
Captain Toad: Treasure Tracker	1.37 million	December 31, 2020	November 13, 2014	Nintendo EAD	Nintendo
Pikmin 3	1.28 million	December 31, 2022	July 13, 2013	Nintendo EAD	Nintendo
The Legend of Zelda: Twilight Princess HD	1.17 million	December 31, 2022	March 4, 2016	Tantalus Media	Nintendo
Lego City Undercover	1.15 million	December 31, 2022	March 18, 2013	TT Fusion	Nintendo
Hyrule Warriors	1 million	January 27, 2015	August 14, 2014	Omega Force; Team Ninja	JP: Koei Tecmo; WW: Nintendo
Pokkén Tournament †	1 million	August 18, 2016	March 18, 2016	Bandai Namco Studios	JP: The Pokémon Company; WW: Nintendo

== See also ==
- List of best-selling Nintendo video games
