= Nintendo Land =

2012 video game

- North American box art
- Developer: Nintendo EAD
- Publisher: Nintendo
- Directors: Takayuki Shimamura; Yoshikazu Yamashita
- Producer: Katsuya Eguchi
- Programmer: Souichi Nakajima
- Artist: Tsubasa Sakaguchi
- Composer: Ryō Nagamatsu
- Platform: Wii U
- Release: NA: November 18, 2012; PAL: November 30, 2012; JP: December 8, 2012
- Genres: Party, adventure
- Modes: Single-player, multiplayer

Nintendo Land (Note: Japanese: ニンテンドーランド, Hepburn: Nintendō Rando) is a 2012 party video game developed and published by Nintendo for the Wii U. The game was first announced at E3 2012 during Nintendo's press conference, and was released as a pack-in launch title for the system.

Nintendo Land features twelve minigames, each based on an existing Nintendo game franchise such as Mario and The Legend of Zelda, depicted as attractions in the eponymous fictional amusement park with an Attraction Tour train designed as a tournament that utilizes all minigames. The minigames are designed to demonstrate the concept of the Wii U and its Wii U GamePad controller to new players, in the same way the 2006 game Wii Sports demonstrated the Wii and its Wii Remote, utilizing many of the controller's features, including its touchscreen controls and motion-sensing capabilities. Some minigames incorporate the Wii Remote Plus and Nunchuk controllers for alternate control schemes and multiplayer support, which also helps exhibit "asymmetric gameplay", a concept in which certain players have different experiences based on the controller they use.

Nintendo Land received positive reviews from critics, with praise for its minigames and demonstration of the Wii U hardware. It sold 5.21 million copies by March 2023, making it the fifth highest-selling Wii U game.

== Gameplay ==
Nintendo Land takes place in an amusement park setting, which serves as a hub for the twelve minigames, which are depicted as the park's attractions. A robotic character named Monita guides the player through the game's features and attractions. The first twelve minigames of Nintendo Land are based on popular Nintendo franchises; two of the attractions (Metroid Blast and Mario Chase) are based on Wii U tech demos shown at E3 2011, but are modified to feature Nintendo characters. These minigames are designed to incorporate elements which utilize the features of the Wii U GamePad, often in conjunction with other players using Wii Remotes and Nunchucks (with some games supporting up to five players in this configuration). The combination of Wii Remotes and Wii U GamePads allows for asymmetric gameplay, where players have different experiences depending on which controller scheme they use. Completing minigames and certain objectives earns coins, which can be used to play a single-player pachinko minigame. Winning pachinko stages will earn new items (of which there are 200) for decorating the Nintendo Land hub area.

=== Team attractions ===
Number of players: 1–5 (1-4 in The Legend of Zelda: Battle Quest)

The Legend of Zelda: Battle Quest

Based on The Legend of Zelda series, up to three players (respectively dressed in red, blue, and yellow) use their Wii Remotes as swords to fight AI enemies. One more player (in green) uses the Wii U GamePad to control a character in the rear of the pack using a bow and arrow. The player with the GamePad can also lift their controller to spy for sniping AI. To reload their bow and arrow, the player aims the GamePad down.

Metroid Blast

Based on the Metroid series and the "Battle Mii" tech demo from E3 2011, Metroid Blast an action-adventure game, similar to its original series. The player using the Wii U GamePad controls Samus' Gunship, while up to four players with Wii Remotes and Nunchuks control Mii characters on foot, wearing Varia Suits. There are three modes: "Assault Mission", "Surface-Air Combat", and "Ground Battle". In "Assault Mission", the players cooperate to defeat waves of enemies and complete missions. In "Surface-Air Combat", the players with Wii Remotes and Nunchuks try to shoot down the player with the GamePad. In "Ground Battle" all players use Wii Remotes and Nunchuks in a battle for tokens.

Pikmin Adventure

Based on the Pikmin series, one player controls Captain Olimar who can command tiny Pikmin using the Wii U GamePad, whilst four additional players (as red, blue, yellow and white Pikmin) can control larger Pikmin using the Wii Remotes. Players must work together to help navigate levels and defeat enemies, including a boss at the end of the stage. When the boss is defeated, the players board the Hocotate ship from Pikmin 2. There is also a Versus Mode where the players compete for candy.

=== Competitive attractions ===
Number of players: 2–5

Mario Chase

Mario Chase, inspired by the Super Mario series, is a tag-based game that takes place inside an arena consisting of large obstacles, hills, and slides. One player using the GamePad, whose Mii is dressed as Mario, runs away from up to four players, whose Mii characters are dressed in Toad costumes, whose goal is to pursue and catch the single player. The Mario player, who views the action on the GamePad screen from a top-down perspective, has a map of the entire arena and can see the locations of all of the Toad players. The Toad players view the action on the television in split-screen from a third person perspective, and are given only their current distance from Mario in yards or meters (depending on the region). The Toad players win if one of them catches Mario before the time limit expires; otherwise the Mario player will win. If there are two players, two computer-controlled Yoshi carts will assist the Toad.

Luigi's Ghost Mansion

Luigi's Ghost Mansion, inspired by the 2001 Nintendo GameCube launch title Luigi's Mansion, is a game in which up to four players (dressed like Luigi, Mario, Waluigi and Wario) assume the roles of "ghost trackers" and explore a haunted house to hunt and capture a ghost being controlled by the player using the GamePad. Each level is set on a different floor with different layouts of rooms and hallways, and the action is viewed from above, showing the entire floor and the location of all players. The trackers must find the ghost player, who remains invisible on the television screen, and decrease its health (a numerical value from 100 to 0) by shining their flashlights/torches upon it. Meanwhile, the ghost must sneak up and ambush each tracker to make them faint. The ghost's proximity to a tracker is made known when that player's Wii Remote begins to vibrate, and different events or conditions may cause the ghost to temporarily become visible to all trackers. Fainted trackers can be revived by the others by using their flashlights/torches, though flashlight/torch energy is in limited reserve and must be restored by picking up battery items. The ghost wins if all the trackers have fainted; the trackers win if they decrease the ghost's health to zero.

Animal Crossing: Sweet Day

Based on the Animal Crossing series, up to four players control animals trying to collect candy as a team before they get caught three times by the two guards, with both guards being controlled by the player using the GamePad. As players collect more candies, their movement becomes slower, making it easier for them to be caught. If starting the game with only two players, the format changes to the stash rules, where one animal must collect candies and put fifteen into the stashes on the map while avoiding the other player.

=== Solo attractions ===
Number of players: 1 (though other players can assist the GamePad player by utilizing unique abilities on a Wii Remote)

Takamaru's Ninja Castle

Based on the 1986 Famicom Disk System game The Mysterious Murasame Castle, the player uses the GamePad's touchscreen to launch paper shuriken at waves of enemy ninjas. The controller can be tilted in order to change the trajectory of the throws. The player can use a katana to attack boss ninjas or ninjas who are at close range.

Donkey Kong's Crash Course

The player uses the GamePad's gyroscope abilities to guide a trolley through a platform-based obstacle course inspired by the original Donkey Kong arcade game. In addition to the tilt input to move the trolley, the player controls the GamePad's two analog sticks, L and R shoulder buttons, and microphone to activate various levers, elevators, and pathways to advance themselves throughout the course.

Captain Falcon's Twister Race

Based on Nintendo's futuristic racing series F-Zero, the player must race down a track while avoiding obstacles in 12 different areas. The GamePad is held vertically and its internal gyroscope is used to steer the vehicle when the player rotates the GamePad. The GamePad provides an aerial view of the track while the TV provides a third-person view.

Balloon Trip Breeze

Based on Nintendo's Balloon Fight, the player controls their Mii on a playfield similar to the game's Balloon Trip mode. The player swipes the stylus on the GamePad's touch screen to create gusts of wind that move the Mii around. The GamePad offers a zoomed-in view for more precise input, whereas the TV offers a zoomed-out view to see more of the level. The levels are divided into morning, afternoon, evening and night, which are all ended by landing on an island. Occasionally, there are packages on islands that the player can pick up to protect and deliver to the next island.

Yoshi's Fruit Cart

This attraction is based on the Yoshi series. The player uses the stylus on the GamePad touchscreen to draw a trail that guides Yoshi to the goal of each level while collecting all the fruit in the area. The fruit is only visible on the TV screen, so the player must use reference points in the level's background to draw the path on the GamePad. As the player advances in level, obstacles will appear that take away a life from Yoshi if he is led into one.

Octopus Dance

This attraction is based on Game & Watch Octopus. Octopus Dance is a rhythm game which is played with the GamePad's control sticks and gyroscope. Players must memorize the moves and replicate the actions performed by the instructor on screen.

== Development ==
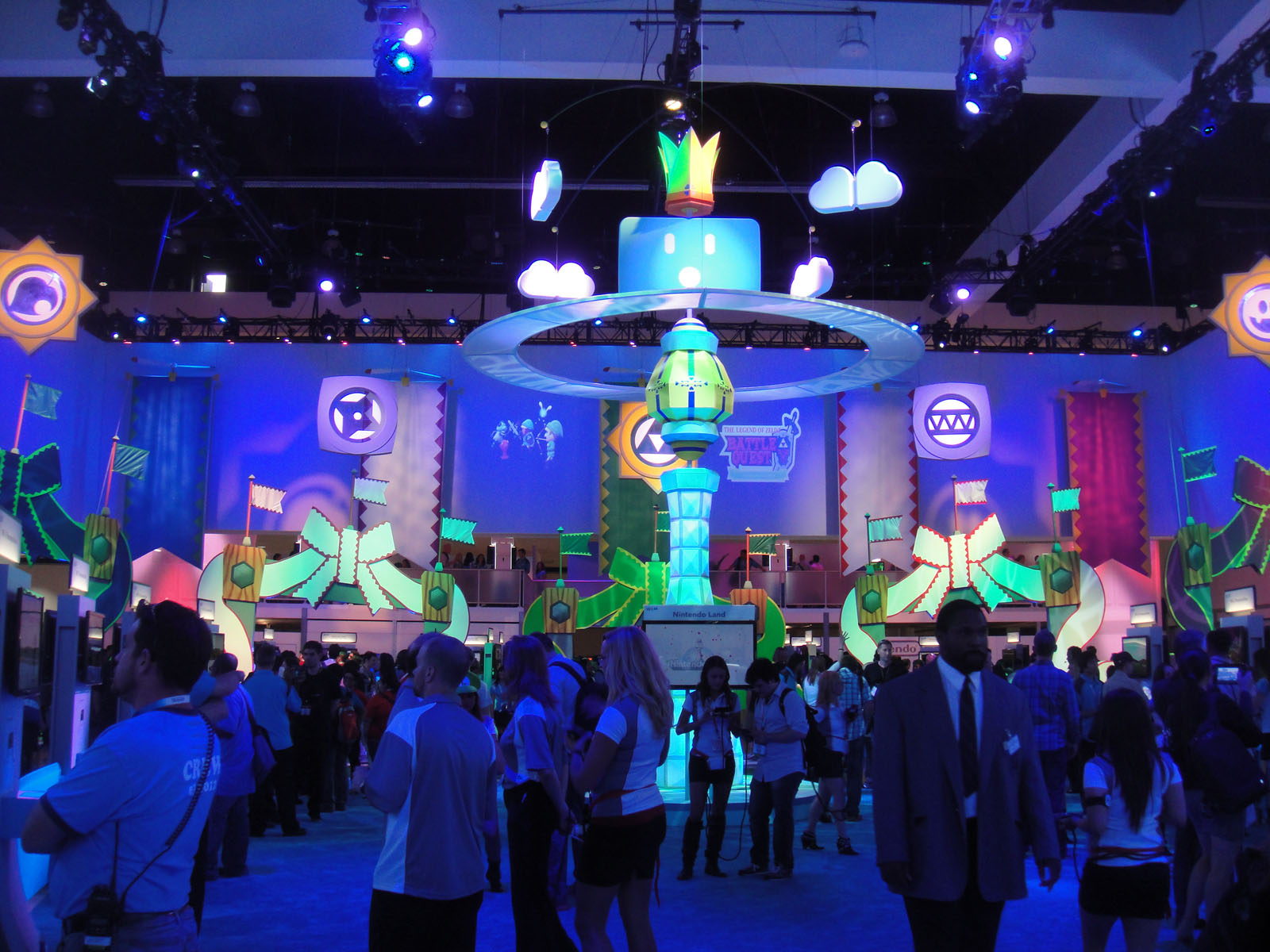
Promotion for Nintendo Land at E3 2012

Development of Nintendo Land started shortly after the release of Wii Sports Resort and was made at a time when the Wii U had not been finalized yet which led to the team experimenting with different prototypes. One of said prototypes involved the use of a gyroscope, which directly led to Shigeru Miyamoto incorporating the technology into the Nintendo 3DS.

The team's goal was to create a product that showcased all the features the new console could do. This led to a problem, as unlike the similar Wii Sports, the games were not inherently related. Early on one staff member suggested that they attempt to do something that would unite the various Nintendo franchises. As the team considered this too grand a concept, the idea was at first not taken seriously. The developers initially decided to present the theme as an "Expo" which lead to the theme park concept. Although most attractions were easy to theme, the team struggled with some: Metroid Blast was initially themed around Star Fox, while at one point it was considered to theme Donkey Kong Crash Course around either Excitebike or 1080° Snowboarding.

The ability to download the game was originally removed from the Nintendo eShop in North America in November 2013, but was re-added in August 2016.

== Reception ==
=== Critical response ===
Reception

Aggregate scores
Aggregator	Score
GameRankings	78%
Metacritic	77/100

Review scores
Publication	Score
1Up.com	B+
4Players	66/100
Destructoid	7/10
Edge	7/10
Electronic Gaming Monthly	6.5/10
Eurogamer	8/10
Famitsu	35/40
Game Informer	7/10
GameRevolution	4/5
GameSpot	8/10
GamesRadar+	3.5/5
GamesTM	7/10
GameTrailers	6.9/10
Giant Bomb	4/5
Hyper	70/100
IGN	8.7/10
Joystiq	4/5
Nintendo Life	9/10
Nintendo World Report	8.5/10
Official Nintendo Magazine	90%
Polygon	8/10
Video Games (DE)	7/10
VideoGamer.com	6/10

Nintendo Land received "generally favorable" reviews from critics, according to the review aggregation website Metacritic. In Japan, four critics from Famitsu gave the game a total score of 35 out of 40.

Critics praised the game's party atmosphere and attractions, particularly the way they were developed and built up, though a few were critical of simply showing Wii U GamePad capabilities. IGN praised the game for showing the Wii U capabilities, its gameplay, and its detailed and HD graphics, claiming that "Wii Sports has met its match" and giving it an 8.7 score.

During the 16th Annual D.I.C.E. Awards, the Academy of Interactive Arts & Sciences nominated Nintendo Land for "Family Game of the Year" and "Outstanding Innovation in Gaming".

=== Sales ===
By March 2014, the game had sold 3.09 million copies, and by December 2014, it had sold 4.44 million units worldwide. As of March 31, 2026, the game has sold 5.21 million copies, making it the fifth best-selling Wii U video game.

== See also ==
- List of Wii U games
- List of party video games
- 2012 in video games
