= Hey! Pikmin =

2017 platform video game

- Developer: Arzest
- Publisher: Nintendo
- Director: Tomohide Hayashi
- Producers: Naoto Ohshima; Takashi Tezuka
- Designer: Kenta Usui
- Programmer: Yuki Hatakeyama
- Artists: Masamichi Harada; Noboru Shirasu
- Composers: Masato Kouda; Kento Hasegawa
- Series: Pikmin
- Platform: Nintendo 3DS
- Release: JP: July 13, 2017; NA/EU: July 28, 2017; AU: July 29, 2017
- Genres: Action, platform, puzzle
- Mode: Single-player

Hey! Pikmin is a 2017 platform video game developed by Arzest and published by Nintendo for the Nintendo 3DS. A spin-off of the Pikmin series, it is the series' first installment on a handheld console. Hey! Pikmin was released worldwide in July 2017, coinciding with the release of the New Nintendo 2DS XL—the sixth and final hardware revision of the 3DS. The game received mixed reviews from critics, with criticism focusing on its simplicity and lack of depth compared to the mainline console games.

== Gameplay ==
Hey! Pikmin consists of main character Captain Olimar leading a group of Pikmin through a series of 2D side-scrolling platforming levels while collecting items that contain "sparklium", the main source of fuel for Olimar's ship. Unlike other games of the Pikmin series, players do not choose what Pikmin to bring into levels. Instead, players enter a level and use whatever Pikmin they find while exploring. Olimar is able to swim and use a jetpack to reach new areas. Winged Pikmin are able to carry Olimar while flying. Olimar is incapable of attacking on his own, instead relying on the Pikmin for defense. As players continue to collect more sparklium, Olimar is able to upgrade his space suit's capabilities, such as the amount of fuel the jetpack has or the number of hits it can take.

After clearing a level, all recruited Pikmin are taken to the Pikmin Park, an area where Pikmin can be sent to look for more objects with sparklium. By finding colored pellets, the number of Pikmin in the park can be increased. After clearing a section of the Pikmin Park, more sections open up for the Pikmin to explore. The game is compatible with every Amiibo released before the game's launch, which provides a variety of in-game bonuses. A Pikmin-themed Amiibo was also released at launch.

== Plot ==
Olimar is flying in space on his new ship, the S.S. Dolphin II, when he hits an asteroid and crash-lands on an unknown planet. He learns that in order to bring his ship back in working order, he must collect 30,000 of the substance known as Sparklium. He soon re-encounters Red Pikmin, which he figures out he can use to carry Sparklium-rich treasures and acorn-like seeds. These "treasures" are usually common household objects, such as glasses or toothpaste. As Olimar searches more sectors of the planet, he finds Yellow Pikmin, Blue Pikmin, Rock Pikmin, and Winged Pikmin, respectively. Once the player gathers up 30,000 Sparklium, Olimar learns he must retrieve an essential component needed to repair the ship, the Sparklium Converter. However, it is revealed that it was accidentally eaten by a Leech Hydroe and has turned into the Berserk Leech Hydroe, a giant plant-like monster, through the converter's power, which he must fight. After returning the Leech Hydroe back to normal and obtaining the converter from it, Olimar heads back to his home planet, Hocotate.

== Development ==
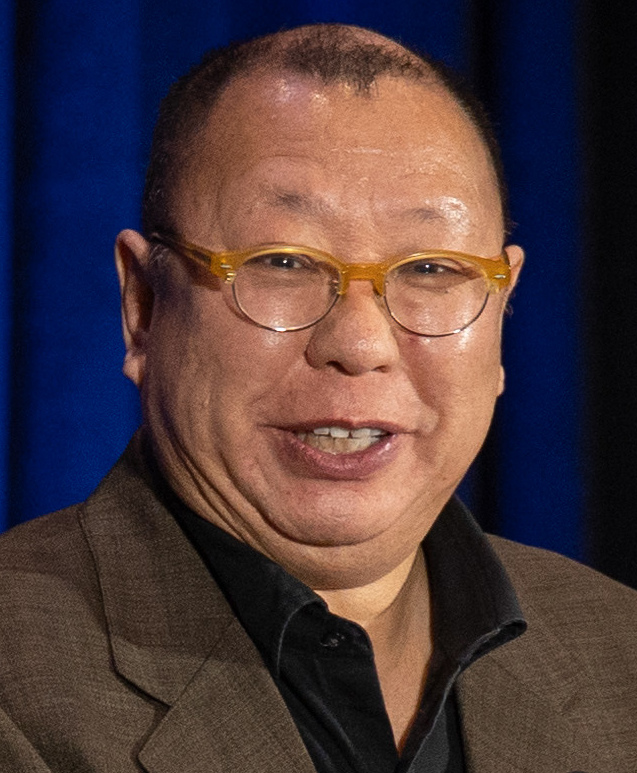
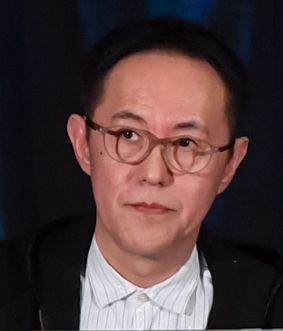
Producers Takashi Tezuka (left, pictured in 2024) and Naoto Ohsima (right, pictured in 2018).

Hey! Pikmin was developed by Arzest and produced by Takashi Tezuka and Naoto Ohshima, Arzest's founder. On November 6, 2014, Shigeru Miyamoto stated during a Q&A of his recently released Pikmin short films that "Continually launching campaigns after the release of software will lay the groundwork for the next iteration of Pikmin in the future. And needless to say, we want it to be one of the motivations for potential consumers to purchase a Wii U. We are making a variety of different efforts."

Later, on January 6, 2015, Miyamoto gave further confirmation that the Pikmin franchise would be receiving more games in the future, stating, "I still have a lot of ideas about what I want to do with Pikmin, but nothing's decided yet in terms of anything else. But of course, we will continue to make Pikmin games."

Furthermore, on September 7, 2015, Miyamoto confirmed in an interview with Eurogamer that the next Pikmin game was in development, and was "very close to completion", although calling it Pikmin 4. During E3 2016, Miyamoto gave further updates, stating: "Yes, you are right, and we're working on [the next Pikmin]. So, you know, when we're in development we have to create a list of priorities and it has been hard to kind of fit that into that list, but we're hopefully starting to see that on the list now."

== Reception ==
Reception

Aggregate scores
Aggregator	Score
Metacritic	69/100
OpenCritic	38% recommend

Review scores
Publication	Score
4Players	75/100
Destructoid	7/10
Edge	6/10
Electronic Gaming Monthly	3/5
Famitsu	8/10, 8/10, 8/10, 9/10
Game Informer	6/10
GameSpot	6/10
GamesTM	7/10
IGN	6.8/10
Nintendo Life	6/10
Nintendo World Report	8/10
Pocket Gamer	3.5/5
Polygon	7/10
USgamer	3/5

The game received "mixed or average" reviews according to the review aggregation website Metacritic. Fellow review aggregator OpenCritic assessed that the game received fair approval, being recommended by 38% of critics. In Japan, four critics from Famitsu gave the game a total score of 33 out of 40. The game was criticized for its simple puzzles and lack of depth. Game Informer stated: "Puzzles are also extremely simple, and usually boil down to tossing Pikmin around obstacles... Nintendo's low-impact blend of strategy and action flounders between relaxing and boring." Areas praised in the game include the amiibo functions. Allegra Frank of Polygon said "Hey! Pikmin might not be the most exciting Nintendo 3DS game out right now—hats off to Miitopia—but its amiibo functionality is the most charming we've seen in a long, long time."

=== Sales ===
Hey! Pikmin sold more than 65,000 units within the first week of its release in Japan. As of January 2021, Hey! Pikmin had sold 157,000 units in Japan, making it the worst-selling Pikmin title in the region.
