= Pikmin =

Nintendo video game series

- Series logo since 2023
- Genres: Real-time strategy; Puzzle
- Developers: Nintendo EAD (2001–2013); Arzest (2017); Nintendo EPD (2020–present); Eighting (2020–present); Niantic (2021–present)
- Publisher: Nintendo
- Creator: Shigeru Miyamoto
- Platforms: GameCube; Wii; Wii U; Nintendo 3DS; Nintendo Switch; Nintendo Switch 2; Android; iOS
- First release: Pikmin; October 26, 2001
- Latest release: Pikmin Finder; September 1, 2023

Pikmin (Note: Japanese: ピクミン, Hepburn: Pikumin) is a real-time strategy and puzzle video game series created by Shigeru Miyamoto, and developed and published by Nintendo. The games focus on directing a legion of plant-like creatures called Pikmin to collect objects, fight enemies, and navigate diverse environments. The game is set on a miniature scale, turning small obstacles such as puddles, rocks, and bug-like fauna into serious hazards for the player character and the Pikmin.

The Pikmin series features four main entries and two spin-offs. The first two, Pikmin (2001) and Pikmin 2 (2004), were made and released for the GameCube and later ported to the Wii as New Play Control! titles in 2008 and 2009. Pikmin 2 was re-released in the Nintendo Selects series in 2012. Both titles were remastered for the Nintendo Switch in 2023 as Pikmin 1+2. A third installment, Pikmin 3, was released for the Wii U in 2013. An enhanced port of Pikmin 3 for the Nintendo Switch, Pikmin 3 Deluxe, was released in 2020. The series' first handheld game, Hey! Pikmin, was released for the Nintendo 3DS in 2017. Pikmin 4 was released for the Nintendo Switch in 2023. Pikmin Bloom, the series' mobile spin-off, was released for iOS and Android in 2021. Pikmin Finder, an augmented reality browser-based mobile game, was released in 2023.

== Gameplay ==
Olimar, surrounded by Pikmin, stands by Pellet Posies (right) that can be brought to the Pikmin Onion to grow more Pikmin.

The series' gameplay has elements of Real-time strategy gameplay, with an explorable over world and a directly controllable character in a third person semi isometric view. The Pikmin games focus on exploring an Earth-like planet named PNF-404, and controlling a crowd of the titular Pikmin. Pikmin are intelligent, loyal, multicolored, plant-animal hybrids that follow the orders of their leader. There have been multiple leaders throughout the series, with the first and most notable being Captain Olimar, a tiny alien from the planet Hocotate introduced in the original Pikmin. Pikmin 2 features Olimar's co-worker Louie and their boss The President who are also playable leaders. Pikmin 3 features leaders from a new alien species. They are Alph, Brittany and Charlie, who come from the planet Koppai and are similar to the Hocotatians, but possess some different features, notably rounded ears instead of pointed ones. Pikmin 4 features a customizable character who is part of an interplanetary rescue team, assisted by Oatchi, a space dog creature with unique abilities.

Pikmin are sent to perform several tasks, with the primary one being the retrieval of items relative to the mission of each game. The player must direct the Pikmin to overcome obstacles and PNF-404's fauna. Individual Pikmin are small and weak against most predators, and some are best suited for certain tasks. It is the responsibility of the player to direct the Pikmin appropriately to ensure successful retrievals of items, avoid danger, and quickly overcome any obstacles and predators. Gameplay is divided into individual days, each of which consists of approximately 13 minutes, in which the player is encouraged to accomplish as much as possible before sunset. At sunset, monsters come out and will eat any Pikmin either left without a leader or far enough away from their Onion.

Pikmin appear in a variety of colors, which signify the Pikmin's abilities and resistance to environmental hazards. The number of Pikmin and their abilities have shifted throughout the franchise, with the first Pikmin game featuring three colors: Red, Yellow and Blue. Red Pikmin are immune to fire, Blue Pikmin can safely move through the water thanks to their gills, and Yellow Pikmin can be thrown higher than other Pikmin, and can carry bomb rocks. In Pikmin 2, Yellow Pikmin have lost their ability to carry bomb rocks in exchange for being immune to electrical hazards, and White and Purple Pikmin are introduced. White Pikmin are the fastest, resistant to poisonous gases, capable of poisoning enemies and capable of spotting objects buried underground. In comparison, Purple Pikmin are significantly stronger and heavier than the other types, which makes them excellent at inflicting damage and carrying heavy items, due to their stunning shockwave effect.

Pikmin 3 introduced two more types: the black and grey-colored Rock Pikmin, and the pink-colored, bee-inspired Winged Pikmin. Rock Pikmin can break crystalline materials and cannot be crushed or impaled. They inflict the most damage out of all Pikmin types when thrown. In comparison, Winged Pikmin can fly freely, enabling them to recover elevated items and attack airborne enemies. Their flight makes it easier to transport things back to the leader's ship or the Pikmins' Onion. In addition to making each type capable of carrying bomb rocks, Pikmin 3 also adjusted the abilities of Yellow, Blue, White and Purple Pikmin. Yellow Pikmin are tied with Rock Pikmin for the fastest digging speed; Blue Pikmin are capable of swimming; White Pikmin are tied with Winged Pikmin for the lowest attack strength and slowest digging speed; Purple Pikmin are tied with Red Pikmin for second highest attack strength and second fastest digging speed, while removing their stunning ability.

Pikmin 4 introduced two other types: Ice Pikmin, which can work during the day like most Pikmin; and Glow Pikmin, which are primarily used during the newly introduced night expeditions and can also be used during the day within caves. Ice Pikmin can freeze enemies and bodies of water, and are invulnerable to being frozen at the cost of having low attack power. They can freeze enemies by attacking them enough, or by being eaten, similarly to the White Pikmin. With the Offensive Method, Ice Pikmin trigger a sort of "Freeze Meter"; if the ring fills, the enemy is frozen. But with the Sacrificial Method, the ring fills significantly upon death, like how the White Pikmin kill their attacker on death. They can float on bodies of water when the water isn't frozen. Depending on the size of the body of water, you may need a whole party of Ice Pikmin to freeze it, leaving only the player and Oatchi left. Glow Pikmin are immune to all the elements of fire, water, electricity, and poison, and can stun enemies when a group is charged together. While they may be used freely at night, they are only accessible during the day within caves and must be summoned using glow seeds, which are gathered from nighttime expeditions. Pikmin 4 readjusted the previous Pikmin types again. Bomb rocks are no longer carried by the Pikmin. Instead, they are items the player can acquire and use at their discretion. Rock Pikmin can now be crushed on hard surfaces, and when taking elemental damage. They also cannot dig fast like Yellow Pikmin, who now dig even faster than before. Purple Pikmin's attack strength is the same as in Pikmin 3, but their shockwave stun returns and gives them extra damage upon impact.

Outside of coloration, all types of Pikmin share the same method of indicating their strength and swiftness: the stalk atop their heads will sport either a leaf, bud or flower, which develops when Pikmin are fed nectar or left planted in the ground for a certain amount of time. By extension, all types of Pikmin are stored in their respective motherships, referred to as "Onions", for safety after sunset, as they are vulnerable to nocturnal predators. The Onions play a vital role in Pikmin reproduction: when any food, such as prey or pellets, is delivered to an Onion, it propagates seeds, which grow and are plucked from the ground as fully developed Pikmin. An Onion serves as an incubator for all Pikmin of its respective color, housing the Pikmin. The Onions travel alongside Olimar as he flies to different locations on the planet PNF-404.

== Plot ==
Captain Olimar crash-lands on an unknown planet and befriends plant-animal creatures that he dubs Pikmin because of their similarity to the brand of carrots called "Pikpik carrots". He has to gather the missing pieces of his broken spaceship to escape before his air supply completely runs out, and he succumbs to the planet's oxygen-rich atmosphere, which is poisonous to his species. Pikmin features three endings, which are dependent on the number of spaceship parts reclaimed. Reclaiming all thirty parts by the final day results in the best ending: Olimar waves goodbye to the Pikmin, who proceed to defend themselves on their own at nighttime, while Onions of various colors observe his departure as he looks back on the unknown planet before returning home. Reclaiming at least the twenty-five required parts by the final day results in the normal ending: Olimar quickly departs, while one of each type of Pikmin runs toward his ship to watch him depart. Lastly, failing to reclaim the twenty-five required parts by the final day results in the worst ending: Olimar crash-lands back onto the planet, succumbs to oxygen poisoning, and is taken by several Pikmin to be placed into an Onion, which converts him into a Pikmin-Hocotatian hybrid.

Pikmin 2 takes place immediately following the events of Pikmin. When Olimar returns to his home planet Hocotate, he discovers that his employer, Hocotate Freight, has gone into severe debt. When the company's president discovers that the souvenir that Olimar has brought back with him is significantly valuable, he orders Olimar and Louie, another employee, to journey back to the Pikmin planet and gather treasure to pay off the debt. After gathering enough to do so and go home, Olimar accidentally leaves Louie behind. He returns with the company president to search for Louie and any remaining treasure. They find an unresponsive Louie being guarded by a creature called the Titan Dweevil, defeat it to save Louie, and take him home.

Hocotate Frieght goes into debt a second time, and Louie and Olimar go yet again to gather more treasure. Unknown to them, a trio from the planet Koppai—the player characters of Pikmin 3—travels to the Pikmin planet in search of fruit to alleviate a famine on their home world. A mysterious malfunction causes Alph, Brittany, and Charlie's ship, the S. S. Drake, to crash, and in the ensuing chaos, the trio lose the cosmic drive key they need to go home. The Koppaites learn through data files scattered throughout the land that their Hocotatian author has mistaken it for a treasure and taken it. After mistaking Louie for the files' author and saving him twice, the trio find and save Olimar from a strange being called the Plasm Wraith. Olimar returns the cosmic drive key, and everyone departs.

The events of Pikmin 4 are inconsistent with those of the first three games: Olimar finds a space dog in addition to the Pikmin after he crashes and sends a distress signal with his voyage logs attached. The rescue team sent in response to the signal also crashes, and a rookie rescue officer goes to the planet to rescue both the original team and Olimar.

=== Characters ===
==== Protagonists ====
The main protagonist of the series is Captain Olimar, an employee of the Hocotate Freight Company, who flies a rocket ship known as the S.S. Dolphin, a reference to the GameCube's developmental code name. He has a wife, son and daughter. The character's Japanese name, Orimā (オリマー), functions as a direct syllabic anagram of Mario (マリオ), another iconic character created by Shigeru Miyamoto. Pikmin 2 introduces Louie, a co-worker of Olimar, who places the Hocotate Freight Company in debt after losing a shipment of gold "Pikpik" brand carrots to a "ravenous space bunny".

Concept art of Pikmin 3 characters Alph, Brittany, Charlie (each labeled 'A', 'B', and 'C', respectively), a Pikmin, and an unnamed fourth character (labeled 'D') who was removed during development

In Pikmin 3, three new characters succeed Olimar as playable leaders: Alph the engineer, Brittany the botanist, and Captain Charlie. All three characters come from Koppai, a planet whose inhabitants are similar to the Hocotatians, and they interact with each other through in-game dialogue. Though not playable during the game's story, Olimar and Louie both appear later in the game's story and become integral to its plot, are playable in Bingo Battle Mode and five of the downloadable mission levels, and Olimar's expedition logs are later discovered by the crew and offer helpful advice regarding PNF-404. Olimar and Louie are playable in the Olimar's Comeback side story missions unique to Pikmin 3 Deluxe.

In Pikmin 4, the main character is customizable by the player, and works as a rookie member of the Rescue Corps organization. They are tasked with rescuing the other Rescue Corps members, as well as Olimar. This player character is one of two playable characters in the main story, along with the Rescue Corps' dog Oatchi. Though not playable during the game's story, Olimar and Louie both appear later in the game's story and become integral to its plot, with Louie appearing in a more antagonistic role. While not playable in the main story, Olimar is playable in the Olimar's Shipwreck Tale side story.

==== Pikmin creatures ====
After becoming stranded on the unknown planet in Pikmin, Olimar becomes acquainted with the species of plant-like beings that he names "Pikmin" because they resemble the "Pikpik" brand of carrots on his home planet of Hocotate. They are small, brightly colored creatures who are each as tall as a US dime. They follow any command: from attacking enemies and defending Olimar to retrieving large artifacts. Pikmin are generally very weak unless they are used in hordes, as they are excellent at working together and speak with strange, squeaky noises. Simple commands can, however, be communicated to them by the use of a whistle or any other device capable of producing high-pitched noises.

A selection of the varying Pikmin types (from left to right): Blue Pikmin, Yellow Pikmin, Red Pikmin, Winged Pikmin, Rock Pikmin, White Pikmin, Purple Pikmin, Ice Pikmin, and Glow Pikmin.

Pikmin come in several colors, each with strengths and weaknesses. In Pikmin, there are three types of Pikmin: Red Pikmin, who are better in combat and can withstand extreme heat and fire; Yellow Pikmin, who can be thrown higher, can use bomb rocks (Pikmin and Pikmin 3, although all Pikmin types are capable of using bomb rocks in this game), are immune to electricity (Pikmin 2 onward), and can dig faster (Pikmin 3 onward); and Blue Pikmin, which have gills and can walk in water (or get splashed with water-based attacks) without drowning. There are also Mushroom Pikmin who attack the other types of Pikmin. They are created when regular Pikmin are infected by spores let out by the Puffstool.

In Pikmin 2, three new species of Pikmin were introduced: Purple Pikmin, White Pikmin, and Bulbmin. Purple Pikmin move slower than normal Pikmin, but have ten times the strength and weight of other Pikmin, giving them the ability to pick up much heavier objects and attack and destroy obstacles and other enemies with fewer numbers. They also have the potential to stun enemies when they land near or on them. they can only be obtained via violet candypop buds. White Pikmin, when ingested by enemies, damage the enemy by being toxic. White Pikmin themselves are immune to poison, can locate buried treasure with their special eyes, and can run faster than other Pikmin. Like Purple Pikmin, they may only be obtained via candypop bud. Bulbmin are a subterranean parasitic species of Pikmin that infect Bulborbs (the most common enemy found within the Pikmin series) and take control of them. These Pikmin are found exclusively within certain cave systems in the game, usually as a pack of up to 10 juvenile Bulbmin and a single adult Bulbmin. While the adult forms of these Pikmin are hostile towards Olimar, the juvenile Bulbmin will follow Olimar like regular Pikmin once the adult is killed. They are immune to most hazards (save explosions, being eaten, being crushed, and bottomless pits), and will not follow Olimar when he leaves the cave they are found in. The only way to "keep" them is if they are transformed into other Pikmin species by Candypop Buds.

Pikmin 3 introduced two new species of Pikmin: Rock Pikmin and Winged Pikmin. The gray-colored Rock Pikmin look like small rocks and can smash through glass, crystals, ice, and the carapaces of large creatures. These Pikmin can also survive crushing attacks from boulders and enemies and are invulnerable to piercing attacks as well. In Pikmin 4, they will only die from being crushed if they are on a solid surface, like stone or metal. Rock Pikmin also cause more initial damage when thrown at an enemy, though they are unable to latch onto them. The pink-colored Winged Pikmin are the smallest species of Pikmin and hover in the air using their small, transparent wings. They can fly over hazards such as water and pits and can carry items in the air, unlike in Pikmin 2. The new types have their respective onions.

Pikmin 4 also introduced two new species of Pikmin: Ice Pikmin and Glow Pikmin. Ice Pikmin can freeze enemies when attacking after a number of hits and instantly freeze after being ingested. If you throw enough Ice Pikmin into water, it will freeze. Glow Pikmin are ghost-like Pikmin that only come out at night and are invulnerable to all elemental hazards (except being eaten). They can only be used during night expeditions or in caves.

==== Other characters ====
Another main character in Pikmin 2 is the President of Hocotate Freight, a large man who runs the company and keeps debt collectors away. The president is forced to sell the Dolphin, and it is replaced by a ship, labeled ‘Hocotate Freight Ship’, that can speak, name, and value the treasure on the planet.

== Development ==
Release timeline New main series entries in bold
| 2001 | **Pikmin** |
2002
2003
| 2004 | **Pikmin 2** |
2005
2006
2007
| 2008 | Pikmin (New Play Control!) |
| 2009 | Pikmin 2 (New Play Control!) |
2010
2011
2012
| 2013 | **Pikmin 3** |
2014
2015
2016
| 2017 | Hey! Pikmin |
2018
2019
| 2020 | Pikmin 3 Deluxe |
| 2021 | Pikmin Bloom |
2022
| 2023 | Pikmin 1+2 |
| 2023 | **Pikmin 4** |
| 2023 | Pikmin Finder |

=== 2001–2003: Pikmin ===
Pikmin is the first game in the series, released on October 26, 2001. The game was ported to the Wii in 2009 as a New Play Control! title, which was made available on the Wii U's Virtual Console service in North America in 2016. An HD remaster of the game was released for Nintendo Switch in 2023.

=== 2004–2012: Pikmin 2 ===
Pikmin 2, released in 2004, has the player collect human artifacts (such as bottle caps, gadgets, and food items) that are referred to as treasure on Hocotate. The player controls both Olimar and his coworker Louie, alternating between the two characters to divide and accomplish more tasks during a single day. Unlike the first game, Pikmin 2 has no deadline, so the player can spend as many days as desired to collect all the treasure.

Like its predecessor, Pikmin 2 was ported to the Wii in 2009 (or 2012 in North America) as a New Play Control! title was made available on the Wii U's Virtual Console service in Europe in 2016. An HD remaster of the game was released for Nintendo Switch in 2023.

=== 2013–2022: Pikmin 3 and spin-offs ===
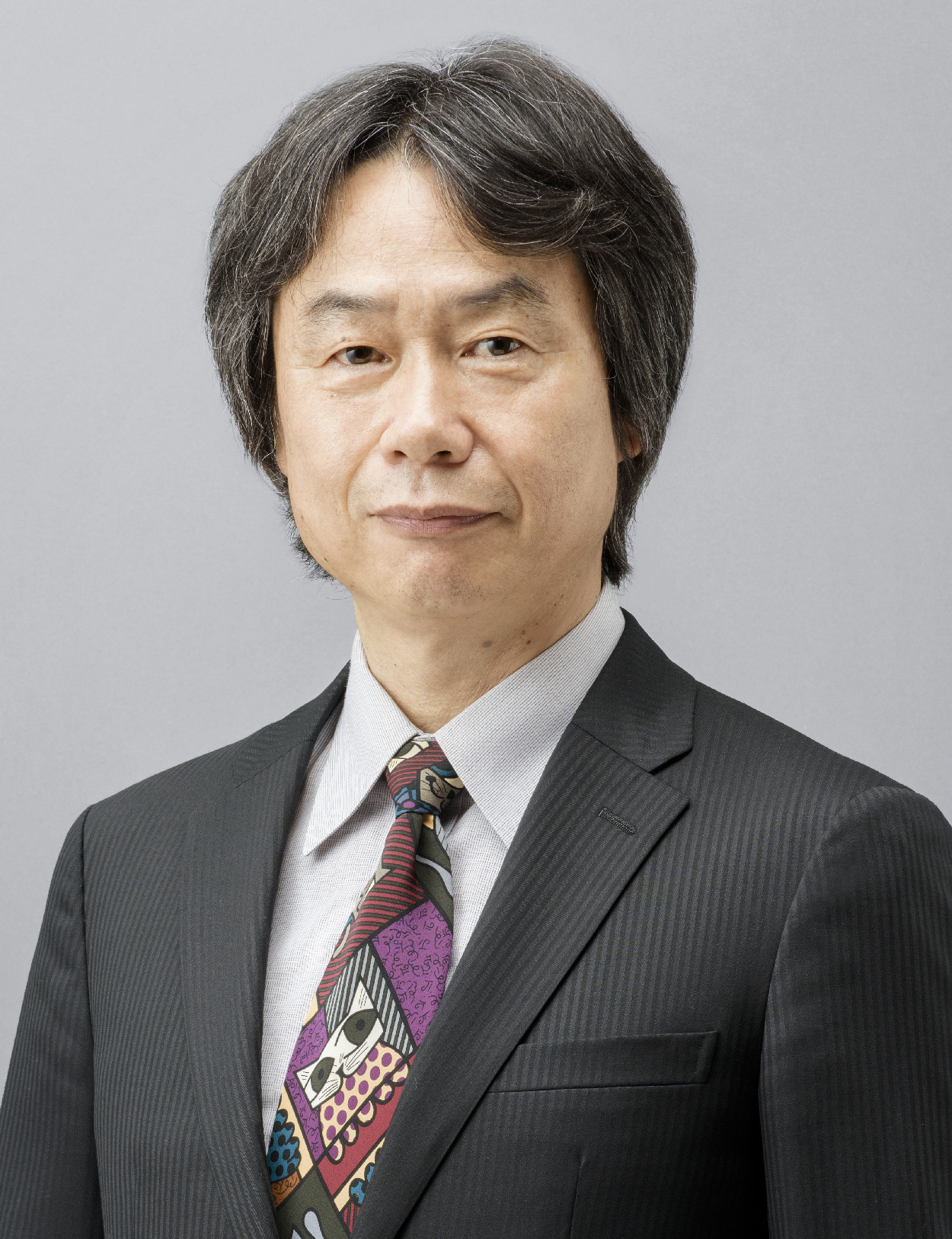
Pikmin creator Shigeru Miyamoto in 2015

Shigeru Miyamoto hinted about the possibilities of a new Pikmin game in a July 2007 interview with IGN, saying "I certainly don't think we've seen the last of Pikmin. I definitely would like to do something with them, and I think the Wii interface in particular is very well suited to that franchise." A later CNET.com interview in April 2008 reported that "For now, Miyamoto looks ahead to other projects for the Wii, mentioning his desire to continue the Pikmin series." A new Pikmin game was confirmed at E3 2008 during Nintendo's developer roundtable, in which Miyamoto stated that his team was working on a new entry in the series. Miyamoto confirmed that Pikmin 3 would be released on the Wii. He also stated that the Wii's controls were "working well" with the game. The announcement in October 2008 of a re-release of the first two Pikmin games on the Wii with updated motion controls, raised concerns about whether Pikmin 3 was in development. However, a subsequent interview with IGN clarified that the re-releases of Pikmin and Pikmin 2 under the New Play Control! series was separate from Pikmin 3. The game was not shown at E3 2009, E3 2010, or E3 2011, but Miyamoto confirmed in June 2010 that the game was still in development. At Miyamoto's roundtable discussion at E3 2011, Miyamoto stated that Pikmin 3 development was moved to Wii U, the Wii successor. He said that the HD graphics for the next system and its special screen-based controller would work better for it. On April 15, 2012, Miyamoto said in a Spanish interview that a new Pikmin game and a new New Super Mario Bros. game will both be showcased for the Wii U at E3 2012. He also added the comment "Anyone who played the original Pikmin games will enjoy playing it." On June 5, 2012, at Nintendo's E3 press conference, Pikmin 3 was announced and featured a trailer that revealed the inclusion of the new Rock Pikmin. Six days later, a second trailer was released that revealed the new Winged Pikmin and other aspects of the game. Although originally intended to be released within the Wii U's launch window, Pikmin 3 was delayed and instead released in mid-2013.

On August 5, 2020, Nintendo announced Pikmin 3 Deluxe, an enhanced port of Pikmin 3 for the Nintendo Switch, for release on October 30, 2020, via Twitter.

A Nintendo 3DS entry in the series was announced in a Nintendo Direct in September 2016 as a side-scrolling action game due for release in 2017. In another Nintendo Direct in April 2017, the game's title was announced as Hey! Pikmin and its release date was announced to be July 28, 2017. The game was developed by Arzest.

On March 22, 2021, Niantic, known primarily for the mobile game Pokémon Go, announced a Pikmin game for mobile devices. Little was known at the time of announcement, except that it will feature similar gameplay to Pokémon Go, using augmented reality technology. A playable prototype was released for select users in Singapore the same day the game was announced. On October 26, 2021, the game was revealed to be titled Pikmin Bloom and launched immediately in Australia and Singapore.

=== 2023–present: Pikmin 4 and spin-offs ===
In September 2015, Miyamoto said that Pikmin 4 was in development, and "very close to completion". On July 7, 2016, Miyamoto said in an E3 interview with Game Rant that Pikmin 4 was still in development, though at a lower priority. On June 19, 2017, Miyamoto reassured Eurogamer that the game was still "progressing". In the years to follow, the game was widely considered vaporware until it was officially unveiled on September 13, 2022.

Pikmin 4 was developed using Unreal Engine, its first use in an internally developed Nintendo EPD game, although the game was co-developed with Eighting. Lead staff include veteran Pikmin developer Yuji Kando, who was one of the two directors of Pikmin 3 and returned as chief director and programming director; Yutaka Hiramuki as game design and lead writer, responsible for the level design and story similarly to his responsibilities on Pikmin 3; Takashi Tezuka, who returned as the mainline series producer, a role he has held since Pikmin 2, and Shigeru Miyamoto, who returned as the general producer, the same position he had in Pikmin 3.

Throughout the series, two styles of gameplay had emerged: a shorter, more focused challenge that encourages resource management and multitasking with an ultimate time limit, seen in Pikmin (2001) and Pikmin 3, and a longer experience featuring the collection of treasures within dangerous underground caves that focus more on the aspect of resource management without time limits in Pikmin 2. In Pikmin 4, the team aimed to appease fans of both gameplay types by trying to mix both styles into one, as well as make a highly approachable and accessible game, considering the series' relative lack of success in reaching general audiences. Additionally, the team wanted to incorporate new and exciting elements as selling points, such as Oatchi. This resulted in an extended development period, with many discussions among staff.

Pikmin 4 was announced by Miyamoto in a Nintendo Direct on September 13, 2022. The teaser trailer gives a brief glimpse of the game's environment, without any gameplay or story details. In the February 8, 2023, Nintendo Direct, Pikmin 4 was revealed to launch on July 21, 2023. A demo was released on June 28, 2023. Pikmin 4 was released on July 21, 2023, for the Nintendo Switch. It received positive reviews from critics, who praised the game's level design, visuals, score, large amount of content, and accessibility to newcomers, while criticizing the limited multiplayer options and low difficulty. The game was commercially successful, selling over three million units worldwide, making it the best-selling game in the series.

The first two games in the series were remastered for the Nintendo Switch in September 2023 as Pikmin 1+2. Pikmin Finder was released in 2023 and is an augmented reality browser-based mobile game. Developed and published by Nintendo using Niantic's 8th Wall development platform, the game involves using the player's mobile camera to display Pikmin and command them to carry treasure back to the player. The game was distributed in early September to coincide with Nintendo Live. On December 31, 2024, Nintendo announced on the game's webpage that Finder's services had been discontinued.

== Reception ==
Sales and aggregate review scores As of November 6, 2025.
| Game | Year | Units sold (in millions) | GameRankings | Metacritic | OpenCritic |
|---|---|---|---|---|---|
| Pikmin | GCN: 2001; Wii: 2008; NS: 2023 | GCN: 1.60; Wii: –; NS: – | GCN: 87%; Wii: 79%; NS: – | GCN: 89/100; Wii: 77/100; NS: – | GCN: –; Wii: –; NS: 75% recommend |
| Pikmin 2 | GCN: 2004; Wii: 2009; NS: 2023 | GCN: 1.12; Wii: –; NS: – | GCN: 89%; Wii: 84%; NS: – | GCN: 90/100; Wii: –; NS: – | GCN: –; Wii: –; NS: 70% recommend |
| Pikmin 3 | Wii U: 2013; NS: 2020 | Wii U: 1.27; NS: 2.40 | Wii U: 87%; NS: – | Wii U: 87/100; NS: 85/100 | Wii U: –; NS: 99% recommend |
| Hey! Pikmin | 2017 | 0.44 | 70% | 69/100 | 38% recommend |
| Pikmin Bloom | 2021 | 2.00 | 68% | 65/100 | – |
| Pikmin 4 | 2023 | 3.48 | 87% | 87/100 | 96% recommend |

The Pikmin series has received generally positive reviews. The series has been praised for its strategic gameplay based on time and resource management, as well as its graphics; Philip Kollar of Polygon described Pikmin 3 as "one of those rare pieces of evidence that a modern Nintendo can still produce something wholly unique."

In a positive review for Pikmin 4, IGN's Jada Griffin wrote that the co-op feature was "more of an assist mode... rather than an actual co-op mode," in contrast to the series' second and third iterations.

== Legacy ==
Olimar was introduced as a playable character in the Super Smash Bros. series beginning with 2008's Super Smash Bros. Brawl, and has appeared in every subsequent entry. He commands the Pikmin in battle and, like in the Pikmin series, he is almost entirely dependent on them. Olimar can pluck new Pikmin from the ground at any time unless he has the maximum number of Pikmin allowed; he can command up to six in Brawl, and three in subsequent games. The Pikmin, as in the Pikmin series, are fragile and can be trounced, but new ones can be plucked from the stage immediately after. Olimar's Final Smash, a signature one-use technique, shows him getting into his Hocotate Spaceship and flying off into the sky, while Red Bulborbs attack the other players on the ground. The ship then plummets to the ground and causes an explosion, dealing damage and knockback to opposing players as Olimar is ejected from it. Super Smash Bros. Brawl also features a playable stage called Distant Planet, based on the general setting of the Pikmin's home planet featured in the first three Pikmin games. The same stage returned in Super Smash Bros. for Nintendo 3DS, while Super Smash Bros. for Wii U added a stage based on Pikmin 3; both stages returned in Super Smash Bros. Ultimate. Alph from Pikmin 3 appears as an alternate costume for Olimar beginning with 3DS and Wii U.

Pikmin appear in the Nintendo 3DS built-in application AR Games. Pikmin make a cameo during the process of transferring downloadable content from a Nintendo DSi to a 3DS, (or transferring from a 3DS to another 3DS or 2DS) with various types of Pikmin carrying the data over. A similar animation occurs when transferring saved data and other information from a Wii to an SD card using the Wii U transfer application, and a second animation, picking up where the first one leaves off, appears when completing the transfer from the SD card to a Wii U.

Nintendo Land includes the series in a team attraction titled Pikmin Adventure, where players' Mii's fight robotic versions of familiar Pikmin foes. Pikmin Adventure utilizes the Wii U GamePad and Wii Remote; the former controls Olimar, whereas the latter allows other players to play as Pikmin. On the Game Boy Advance, the card-based Nintendo e-Reader peripheral included Pikmin minigames exclusive to Japan following the release of Pikmin 2, titled Pikmin 2-E. In the various minigames, players control either Olimar or the Pikmin to complete various puzzles.

Pikmin franchise amiibo figures can be used to unlock a Pikmin Mii costume in Mario Kart 8 Deluxe, and Pikmin character costumes in Super Mario Maker.

Several red, yellow, and blue Pikmin can be found across the land on ledges of Super Nintendo World at Universal Studios Japan, with some carrying objects like coins from the Mario franchise and a berry. In 2025, Miyamoto confirmed that Pikmin can appear across any Nintendo franchise seamlessly, and they have since appeared in the DLC for Super Mario Bros. Wonder and The Super Mario Galaxy Movie.

Pikmin gummy candy was released exclusively in Japan in September 2021. This candy included grape-flavored blues, apple-flavored reds, orange-flavored yellows, and lemon-flavored white Pikmin.

A manga-style comic strip based on the Pikmin series, written by Kino Takahashi, was first published on June 21, 2023.

In a Nintendo Direct on November 1, 2026, Miyamoto announced that Nintendo would refer to November 1 as "Pikmin Day", explaining that three Pikmin (specifically the original three types, Red, Yellow, and Blue) lined up next to each other resemble three ones, as seen when the date is presented as "11.1".

=== Pikmin Short Movies ===
On November 5, 2014, three short, animated Pikmin movies were released on the Wii U and Nintendo 3DS eShop, after being shown at the Tokyo International Film Festival. The films, "The Night Juicer", "Treasure in a Bottle", and "Occupational Hazards", each feature groups of Pikmin and often Captain Olimar as well. To commemorate the films, puzzles related to them were made available in the Puzzle Swap game mode of StreetPass Mii Plaza. They were later uploaded to YouTube to promote Pikmin 3 Deluxe.

=== Close to You ===
On October 7, 2025, an animated short film featuring a baby chasing a moving pacifier, with Pikmin motifs, was released, leading to speculation that it was related to the Pikmin series. Others incorrectly guessed that it was an origin story to the Mario character Rosalina for The Super Mario Galaxy Movie, pointing out the baby's similar appearance. The next day, Nintendo released a second version of the short film on the Nintendo Today! app that revealed that the pacifier was being moved by previously invisible Pikmin. Whereas the first short featured a piano piece, the second short featured a more complete instrumentation. On October 22, 2025, both versions were released together on YouTube. The shorts were the first to be produced by Nintendo in-house, by its animation studio Nintendo Pictures.

=== Hello! Pikmin ===
In the Pikmin Day Direct on November 1, 2026, Nintendo announced a new series of animated Pikmin short movies produced by Nintendo Pictures and Miyamoto titled Hello! Pikmin. The first of these, titled "Frog", was shown in the Direct, and the second, "Dream", was released on Nintendo Today! and YouTube the following day. Additional short films are scheduled to release once a month.
