= Pikmin 3 =

2013 video game

- Packaging artwork
- Developer: Nintendo EAD (Note: Additional work by Monolith Soft. Nintendo EPD and Eighting developed the Nintendo Switch version.)
- Publisher: Nintendo
- Directors: Shigefumi Hino; Yuji Kando
- Producer: Hiroyuki Kimura
- Designers: Atsushi Miyagi; Takafumi Kiuchi; Takuro Shimizu
- Programmer: Yuji Kando
- Artist: Keisuke Nishimori
- Writers: Kunio Watanabe; Makoto Wada
- Composers: Asuka Hayazaki; Atsuko Asahi; Hajime Wakai; Soshi Abe (Deluxe); Babi (Deluxe)
- Series: Pikmin
- Platforms: Wii U; Nintendo Switch
- Release: Wii U; JP: July 13, 2013; EU: July 26, 2013; AU: July 27, 2013; NA: August 4, 2013; Nintendo Switch; WW: October 30, 2020
- Genres: Real-time strategy, Action, Puzzle
- Modes: Single-player, multiplayer

Pikmin 3 (Note: ピクミン3 (Japanese: Pikumin 3)) is a 2013 real-time strategy and puzzle video game developed and published by Nintendo for the Wii U video game console. It is the sequel to the GameCube games Pikmin (2001) and Pikmin 2 (2004), and it was released in Japan on July 13, 2013, and in all other regions the next month. Shigeru Miyamoto announced Pikmin 3 on July 16, 2008, for the Wii console, later stating at E3 2011 that it had transitioned to the Wii U.

The game builds upon existing elements of the Pikmin series, adding more player characters, Pikmin types, and support for Off-TV Play and downloadable content. In the single-player campaign, the player controls three alien captains: Alph, Brittany, and Charlie, who explore the surface of a planet they name PNF-404 in search of cultivable fruit seeds to save their home planet, Koppai, from famine. They befriend the Pikmin, who assist them in combat, solving puzzles, and gathering resources.

Pikmin 3 received generally positive reviews from critics, with praise for the gameplay, graphics and level design. Pikmin 3 Deluxe, an enhanced port with new content for the Nintendo Switch, was released on October 30, 2020. A stand-alone sequel, Hey! Pikmin, was released in 2017 for the Nintendo 3DS, while a direct sequel, Pikmin 4, was released on July 21, 2023, on the Nintendo Switch.

== Gameplay ==
The player simultaneously controls three characters: Alph (middle), Brittany, and Captain Charlie, who can each lead separate Pikmin groups. The Pikmin are seen digging up a Pocked Airhead to carry it to the S.S. Drake.

The player controls a captain, which commands a horde of up to 100 plant-like creatures called Pikmin, and uses their unique abilities to explore the world, combat enemies, solve puzzles, and amass fruits. Pikmin can be directed to accomplish various tasks, such as building bridges, destroying barriers, collecting spoils, and defeating enemies. They come in various colors and different physical features that signify their special abilities and immunities to hazards. For example, Red Pikmin are immune to fire and are stronger than other Pikmin, Yellow Pikmin are immune to electricity and can be thrown farther, and Blue Pikmin are immune to water.

Pikmin 3 retains the Red, Yellow, and Blue Pikmin, and it also introduces two Pikmin types: the grey-colored Rock Pikmin, which can destroy tough barriers and are immune to being crushed by heavy objects; and the pink-colored Winged Pikmin, which can attack airborne enemies and travel through the air and over water. The game also retains the White Pikmin, which poisons enemies when eaten, and the Purple Pikmin, which have the strength of ten Pikmin, both of which are from Pikmin 2, but are only available in the side modes of this game.

The player controls up to three captains and switches between them to accomplish tasks and solve puzzles.

The initial release of Pikmin 3 offered three control schemes: the Wii U GamePad, Wii U Pro Controller, or Wii Remote (Plus) with the Nunchuk accessory. A downloadable update on May 30, 2014, added stylus control on the GamePad. In all cases, the Wii U GamePad has an overhead map on its touch screen and is used to access the similar-looking KopPad, which the captains use for communication and to view the map and other statistics. The KopPad allows players to map the captains' routes and take photographs, which could be uploaded to the now-defunct Miiverse.

Aside from the single-player story campaign, the game features a split-screen two-player multiplayer mode called Bingo Battle, in which each player has a 4-by-4 grid of items to collect, and they must compete to get four-in-a-row on their board. Mission Mode is a single-player or cooperative multiplayer experience where the players are presented with a task based on Pikmin fundamentals, which must be completed in a limited amount of time. There are three trials present within Mission Mode: Collect Treasure, where the players must collect all the fruit and enemies on the map using a set amount of Pikmin before time runs out; Battle Enemies, where the players must kill all the enemies on the map as quickly as possible; and Defeat Bosses, which allows the players to rematch the bosses from the story mode.

== Plot ==
In the year 20XX, the inhabitants of the planet Koppai are suffering from famine as a result of a "booming population, booming appetites, and a basic lack of planning". Having scouted multiple planets with their SPERO ships to find ones with resources, one returns positive after scouting the Pikmin planet, which they call PNF-404. It has an abundance of cultivable food, and so three Koppaite captains are sent to explore the planet and retrieve the food sources that will save their planet: the engineer Alph, the botanist Brittany, and the captain Charlie. However, upon landing on the planet, their ship, the S.S. Drake, malfunctions and crash-lands, separating the three. Charlie falls to the Distant Tundra and meets the Yellow Pikmin, but is eaten by the Vehemoth Phosbat. Alph awakens in the Tropical Wilds and meets the Red Pikmin, who help him recover their ship. Alph learns that the "cosmic-drive key", which is required to return to Koppai, has disappeared following the crash.

Alph finds Brittany in the Garden of Hope and rescues her with help from the Rock Pikmin, and they rescue Charlie after the S.S. Drake crashes once more in the Distant Tundra and Brittany discovers the Yellow Pikmin. The trio recover some of Captain Olimar's lost data files, and find out that he has the key, having mistakenly thought it was a treasure. Later, they mistakenly rescue Louie from the Twilight River after receiving his SOS message that was meant for Olimar. He steals their food supply and Charlie's rubber duck, and escapes to his and Olimar's destroyed spaceship in the Garden of Hope. They retrieve and interrogate him, and he tells them that Olimar is in the Formidable Oak. There, the captains and the Pikmin defeat a mysterious life form known as the Plasm Wraith to save Olimar, and he returns the cosmic-drive key to them. The three use the key for the ship, offering Olimar and Louie a ride back to Hocotate, and they return home as the Pikmin wave goodbye.

The game's ending varies based on the number of fruit the player retrieved during the game. If the player collects all fruits, the narrator states that the three have successfully completed their mission to restore life in Koppai and that the S.S. Drake's crash-landing may not have been an accident. In a post-credits scene, some Pikmin see a flaming object falling to the ground and run to it. An additional story in Pikmin 3 Deluxe, "Olimar's Comeback", reveals the object to be a pod containing Olimar and Louie, who were sent back to the planet by the president of Hocotate Freight to retrieve and repair the destroyed spaceship they left behind.

== Development ==
Concept art of Pikmin 3 characters Alph, Brittany, Charlie (each labeled 'A', 'B', and 'C', respectively), a Pikmin, and an unnamed fourth character (labeled 'D') who was removed during development

Shigeru Miyamoto first hinted about the possibility of a new Pikmin game in a July 2007 interview with IGN, saying "I certainly don't think we've seen the last of Pikmin. I definitely would like to do something with them, and I think the Wii interface in particular is very well suited to that franchise." A later CNET.com interview in April 2008 reported that "For now, Miyamoto looks ahead to other projects for the Wii, mentioning his desire to continue the Pikmin series."

A new Pikmin game was confirmed at E3 2008 during Nintendo's developer roundtable, in which Miyamoto stated that his team were working on a new entry in the series. Details concerning gameplay and development were left unmentioned. At Miyamoto's roundtable discussion at E3 2011, Miyamoto stated that Pikmin 3 development was moved to Wii U, the Wii's successor. He said that the Wii U's HD graphics and secondary-screen GamePad would work better for it.

On June 5, 2012, Pikmin 3 was shown at Nintendo's press conference at E3. Some of the new gameplay aspects were demonstrated, including Rock Pikmin and the GamePad controls. The company said that it would be released around the same time as the Wii U, but its release was later delayed until mid-2013. When questioned about the presence or absence of the Purple and White Pikmin types featured in the second game, Miyamoto stated that "They're in there somewhere, just hidden...". A video released from Nintendo Direct confirmed that they would in fact be in the game, but only in the game's Mission Mode and Bingo Battle.

In a Polygon interview, Miyamoto stated that he plans to have a series of animated Pikmin shorts released on the Nintendo 3DS prior to Pikmin 3's launch. The shorts went unheard of for months after the game's initial release, were eventually mentioned by Miyamoto a year later, and were announced to be released on November 5, 2014, on the Nintendo eShop.

== Release ==
Pikmin 3 was released in Japan on July 13, 2013. The game was released in Europe on July 26, Australia on July 27, and North America on August 4.

The Collect Treasure stage pack downloadable content (DLC) added four missions on October 1, 2013. The Battle Enemies stage pack DLC added four missions on November 6, 2013. Released with the DLC was an update adding GamePad stylus control. A third DLC pack of new stages (rather than remixes of old stages as in previous DLC) was released on December 2, 2013. Four new Collect Treasure and four new Battle Enemies stages have been announced. An update added one free Collect Treasure and one free Battle Enemies mission. The game and all of its DLC packs were de-listed from the Wii U Nintendo eShop in August 2020 following the announcement of Pikmin 3 Deluxe on Switch. The game would eventually be re-listed a short time later, minus the ability to purchase the DLC directly from Wii U Nintendo eShop. Indirect purchase of the DLC however within game through the Pikmin 3 title itself remained available until the Wii U Nintendo eShop's closure on March 27, 2023. Re-downloading an already purchased digital copy of Pikmin 3, the free updates and already purchased DLC packs will remain possible after the Wii U eShop's closure for the foreseeable future.

=== Pikmin 3 Deluxe ===
Pikmin 3 Deluxe is an enhanced version for Nintendo Switch, released on October 30, 2020. Eighting handled the porting, planning, development, and coordination of new elements. The game includes a new prologue and epilogue featuring Captain Olimar and Louie, multiple difficulty modes, cooperative play in the story mode, the reintroduction of the Piklopedia from Pikmin 2, and includes all DLC from the Wii U version.

Pikmin 3 Deluxe was heavily criticized for major performance issues when played on a Nintendo Switch 2 at the console's launch, with issues including visual glitching and screen flickering at certain scenes. GamesRadar noted how one player "experienced input lag on the game's menus, stuttering during gameplay, hard crashes, and an ominous red glow staying on the screen." Many of these issues were fixed with the Version 1.1.3 update released on June 16, 2025.

== Reception ==
=== Critical response ===
Reception

Aggregate scores
Aggregator	Score	
Aggregator	NS	Wii U
Metacritic	85/100	87/100
OpenCritic	99% recommend(Deluxe)	N/A

Review scores
Publication	Score	
Publication	NS	Wii U
4Players	85/100	85/100
Destructoid	9/10	9.5/10
Edge	N/A	8/10
Electronic Gaming Monthly	N/A	5/5
Eurogamer	Recommended	9/10
Famitsu	N/A	37/40
Game Informer	9/10	9/10
GameRevolution	4/5	4.5/5
GameSpot	8/10	8/10
GamesRadar+	4/5	4.5/5
GamesTM	N/A	9/10
GameTrailers	N/A	8.8/10
Giant Bomb	N/A	4/5
Hardcore Gamer	4.5/5	4.5/5
Hyper	N/A	80/100
IGN	9/10	8.8/10
Jeuxvideo.com	15/20	N/A
Joystiq	N/A	4/5
Nintendo Life	8/10	9/10
Nintendo World Report	8.5/10	N/A
Official Nintendo Magazine	N/A	90%
Polygon	N/A	8/10
Shacknews	8/10	7/10
The Guardian	N/A	5/5
TouchArcade	4.5/5	N/A
VentureBeat	4/5	N/A
VideoGamer.com	N/A	9/10

The game received generally favorable reviews. Most reviewers praised its well designed levels, high-quality graphics, and gameplay. In Japan, four reviewers from Famitsu gave the game a total score of 37/40, with one of the critics giving a perfect score of 10/10. The Sunday Times gave it 5 out of 5 stars. IGN scored the game 8.8/10, praising its design but stating that it was too short. ITF Gaming gave it a 9/10 for its lush, well-crafted environments. Ben Croshaw of The Escapist praised the graphics, controls, and incentive for urgency, but critiqued the Wii U for not initially utilizing the touch screen as a means of individually selecting targets.

=== Sales ===
In Japan, Pikmin 3 became the best-selling game of its launch week, with around 93,000 copies in two days and helping to sell 22,200 Wii U systems. In the UK, the game debuted at number 2 in the all-formats chart, behind the retail version of Minecraft for Xbox 360. In the US, it became the best-selling game of its debut week, and according to the NPD Group, 115,000 units were sold in its first month, entering the all-formats chart at number 10. As of December 31, 2013, about 210,000 units had been sold in the US.

Pikmin 3 Deluxe became the best-selling retail game during its first week of release in Japan, with 171,349 physical copies sold. As of March 31, 2021, 2.04 million units of Pikmin 3 Deluxe had been sold, with 860,000 sold in Japan, and 1.18 million sold elsewhere. As of December 2021, Pikmin 3 Deluxe has sold 2.23 million copies worldwide. As of December 2022, the game has sold 2.40 million copies.

== See also ==
- List of Wii U games
- List of puzzle video games
- 2013 in video games
