= E3 2012 =

18th annual Electronic Entertainment Expo

Electronic Entertainment Expo 2012
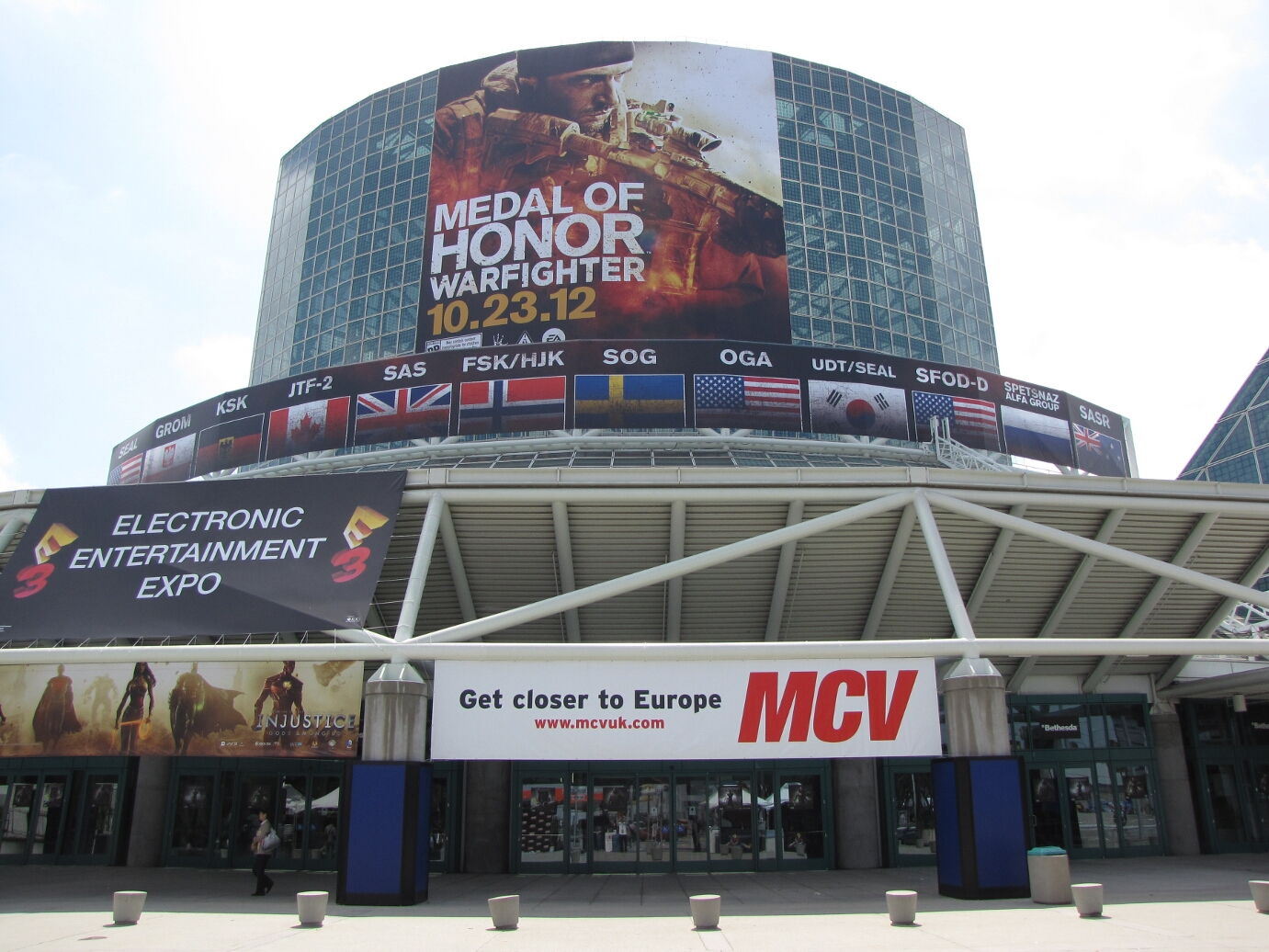
- The Los Angeles Convention Center during E3 2012, with Medal of Honor: Warfighter occupying entrance advertising.
- Genre: Multi-genre
- Begins: June 5, 2012
- Ends: June 7, 2012
- Venue: Los Angeles Convention Center
- Locations: Los Angeles, California
- Country: United States
- Previous event: E3 2011
- Next event: E3 2013
- Attendance: 45,700
- Organizer: Entertainment Software Association
- Filing status: Nonprofit

The Electronic Entertainment Expo 2012 (E3 2012) was the 18th E3 held. The event took place at the Los Angeles Convention Center in Los Angeles, California, from June 5, 2012, until June 7, 2012, with 45,700 total attendees. It was televised on Spike and streamed online to computers, mobile devices, PlayStation Home and on Xbox Live via IGN's application. This was the last event to be broadcast by G4 along with being the last one to feature a physical press conference by Nintendo which mainly focused on games that were coming to the then upcoming Wii U video game console that launched later that year and was later considered to be a commercial failure.

== Press conferences ==
Prior to the show, several companies made announcements regarding their products. Nintendo unveiled a new design for the Wii U controller, known now as the Wii U GamePad, along with a slightly modified console. Each of the three major console producers have also held or planned press conferences.

=== Konami ===
Konami held its 2nd annual pre-E3 show on May 31.

=== Microsoft ===
Microsoft's press conference took place on June 4 at 9:30am in the Galen Center. It was known as "Xbox: Entertainment Evolved," in the vein of Halo: Combat Evolved. It was streamed live on Xbox Live and played live on SPIKE TV.

At the conference the company showed footage from upcoming sequels Halo 4, Call of Duty: Black Ops II, and Resident Evil 6. It also showed new entries in classic franchises, including the games Tomb Raider, Forza Horizon, South Park: The Stick of Truth, and many others. It also announced new intellectual property, including Ascend: New Gods and LocoCycle. The company expanded its Kinect lineup with several new titles. Entertainer Usher made an appearance to demonstrate the Dance Central 3 dancing game. A castle-wrecking game called Wreckateer was also demonstrated. Matter, an Xbox 360-exclusive title for the Kinect was also shown.

Microsoft also unveiled expanded entertainment and multimedia features for the Xbox 360. The company announced new sports content partnerships, including those with the National Basketball Association, National Hockey League, and ESPN to bring their content to the console. Xbox Music was also revealed, which will carry the Xbox brand to Windows 8. The company unveiled Internet Explorer 10 for the console, which can be controlled via tablet devices. The console maker also announced Xbox SmartGlass, a technology designed to allow play experiences from mobile devices, including those running Windows 8 and Windows Phone operating systems.

=== Electronic Arts ===
Electronic Arts took the stage on June 4 at 1:00pm, showcasing ten titles or families of titles. Included were games such as Crysis 3, Dead Space 3, Medal of Honor: Warfighter, Need for Speed: Most Wanted and SimCity.

=== Ubisoft ===
Ubisoft held a press conference on June 4 at 3:00pm at the Los Angeles Theatre, showing many titles including Assassin's Creed III, Far Cry 3, Just Dance 4, Rayman Legends, Tom Clancy's Splinter Cell: Blacklist, Watch Dogs and ZombiU.

=== Sony ===
Sony's press conference took place on June 4 at 6:00pm at the Los Angeles Memorial Sports Arena. Sony and its partners showcased existing titles, including first party games such as God of War: Ascension, PlayStation All-Stars Battle Royale and The Last of Us and third party games such as Assassin's Creed III and Far Cry 3.

Sony also announced a title called Beyond: Two Souls. Sony provided updates on the PlayStation Suite mobile framework, renaming it to PlayStation Mobile and adding HTC as a partner. It also unveiled the Wonderbook augmented reality reading system.

=== Nintendo ===
Nintendo's main press conference took place on June 5 at 9:00am in the Nokia Theatre. The company showed 23 Wii U titles, including first party games like Pikmin 3, and New Super Mario Bros. U, and third party games like Batman: Arkham City: Armored Edition, Scribblenauts: Unlimited, and ZombiU. The company showed more casual games including Wii Fit U and Nintendo Land. On stage, Reggie Fils-Aimé stated "I feel just like a Purple Pikmin."

The next day, June 6, Nintendo held a smaller "software showcase" conference based solely on the Nintendo 3DS, showcasing new content and games such as New Super Mario Bros. 2, Paper Mario: Sticker Star and Luigi's Mansion: Dark Moon. This was also the last traditional Nintendo E3 press conference as E3 2013 onwards would take the form of a Nintendo Direct (with the exception of E3 2016, which only had Nintendo Treehouse Live).

== List of notable exhibitors ==
- 2K Games
- Activision
- Alienware
- Atari
- Bethesda Softworks
- Bohemia Interactive
- Capcom
- Crytek
- Disney Interactive
- Electronic Arts
- Havok
- Konami
- Microsoft
- Namco Bandai Games
- Nintendo
- Nvidia
- Riot Games
- Sega
- Sony
- Sony Online Entertainment
- Square Enix
- Tecmo Koei
- Trion Worlds
- Ubisoft
- Valve
- Wargaming
- Warner Brothers Entertainment
- Zynga

== List of featured games ==
2K Games: Borderlands 2 (PC / PS3 / Xbox 360); NBA 2K13 (PC / PS3 / PSP / Wii / Wii U / Xbox 360); Spec Ops: The Line (PC / PS3 / Xbox 360); XCOM: Enemy Unknown (PC / PS3 / Xbox 360); Activision: Call of Duty: Black Ops II (PC / PS3 / Xbox 360); Family Guy: Back to the Multiverse (PC / PS3 / Xbox 360); Skylanders: Giants (3DS / PS3 / Wii / Wii U / Xbox 360); The Amazing Spider-Man (PC / 3DS / DS / PS3 / Wii / Xbox 360); Transformers: Fall of Cybertron (PC / PS3 / Xbox 360); Atlus: Persona 4 Arena (PS3 / Xbox 360); The Testament of Sherlock Holmes; Bethesda Softworks: Dishonored (PC / PS3 / Xbox 360); The Elder Scrolls Online (PC); Bohemia Interactive: Arma 3 (PC); Carrier Command: Gaea Mission (PC / Xbox 360); Capcom: Resident Evil 6 (PC / PS3 / Xbox 360); DmC: Devil May Cry (PC / PS3 / Xbox 360); Lost Planet 3 (PC / PS3 / Xbox 360); Disney Interactive Studios: Epic Mickey 2: The Power of Two (PC / PS3 / Wii / Wii U / Xbox 360); Epic Mickey: Power of Illusion (3DS); Electronic Arts: Command & Conquer: Generals 2 (PC); Crysis 3 (PC / PS3 / Xbox 360); Dead Space 3 (PC / PS3 / Xbox 360); FIFA 13 (3DS / PC / PS2 / PS3 / PSP / PS Vita / Wii / Wii U / Xbox 360); Madden NFL 13 (PS3 / PS Vita / Wii / Wii U / Xbox 360); Medal of Honor: Warfighter (PC / PS3 / Xbox 360); NBA Live 13 (PS3 / Xbox 360); NCAA Football 13 (PS3 / Xbox 360); Need for Speed: Most Wanted (PC / PS3 / PS Vita / Wii U / Xbox 360); NHL 13 (PS3 / Xbox 360); SimCity (PC); Harmonix: Dance Central 3 (Xbox 360); Rock Band Blitz (PS3 / Xbox 360)	Konami: Castlevania: Lords of Shadow 2 (PC / PS3 / Xbox 360); Castlevania: Lords of Shadow - Mirror of Fate (3DS); New Little King's Story (PS Vita); Metal Gear Rising: Revengeance (PS3 / Xbox 360); Silent Hill: Book of Memories (PS Vita); LucasArts: Star Wars: 1313 (PC); Microsoft: Fable: The Journey (Xbox 360); Forza Horizon (Xbox 360); Gears of War: Judgement (Xbox 360); Halo 4 (Xbox 360); Matter (Xbox 360); Namco Bandai: Dragon Ball Z for Kinect (Xbox 360); Ni no Kuni: Wrath of the White Witch (PS3); One Piece: Pirate Warriors (PS3); Star Trek: The Game (PC / PS3 / Xbox 360); Tekken Tag Tournament 2 (PS3 / Wii U / Xbox 360); Nintendo: Game & Wario (Wii U); Luigi's Mansion: Dark Moon (3DS); New Super Mario Bros. 2 (3DS); New Super Mario Bros. U (Wii U); Nintendo Land (Wii U); Paper Mario: Sticker Star (3DS); Pikmin 3 (Wii U); Project P-100 (Wii U); Wii Fit U (Wii U); Sega: Aliens: Colonial Marines (PC / PS3 / Xbox 360); Hatsune Miku (PS Vita); Rhythm Thief & the Emperor's Treasure (3DS); Sonic & All-Stars Racing Transformed (PC / 3DS / PS3 / PS Vita / Wii U / Xbox 360); Sony: Beyond: Two Souls (PS3); God of War: Ascension (PS3); Planetside 2 (PC); LittleBigPlanet Karting (PS3); PlayStation All-Stars Battle Royale (PS3 / PS Vita); Soul Sacrifice (PS Vita); Sly Cooper: Thieves in Time (PS3); The Last of Us (PS3)	Square Enix: Demons' Score (Android / iOS); Drakerider (Android / iOS); Final Fantasy Dimensions (Android / iOS); Heroes of Ruin (3DS); Hitman: Absolution (PC / PS3 / Xbox 360); Kingdom Hearts 3D: Dream Drop Distance (3DS); Quantum Conundrum (PC / PS3 / Xbox 360); Sleeping Dogs (PC / PS3 / Xbox 360); Theatrhythm Final Fantasy (3DS); Tomb Raider (PC / PS3 / Xbox 360); Tecmo Koei: Dead or Alive 5 (PS3 / Xbox 360); THQ: Company of Heroes 2 (PC); Darksiders II (PC / PS3 / Wii U / Xbox 360); Metro: Last Light (PC / PS3 / Xbox 360); South Park: The Stick of Truth (PC / PS3 / Xbox 360); TT Games: Lego Batman 2: DC Super Heroes (3DS / DS / PC / PS3 / PS Vita / Wii / Wii U / Xbox 360); Lego City: Undercover (Wii U); Lego The Lord of the Rings (3DS / DS / PC / PS3 / PS Vita / Wii / Xbox 360); Ubisoft: Assassin's Creed III (PC / PS3 / Wii U / Xbox 360); Assassin's Creed III: Liberation (PS Vita); Far Cry 3 (PC / PS3 / Xbox 360); Just Dance 4 (PS3 / Wii / Wii U / Xbox 360); Marvel Avengers: Battle for Earth (Wii U / Xbox 360); Rayman Legends (Wii U); ShootMania Storm (PC); Tom Clancy's Splinter Cell: Blacklist (PC / PS3 / Wii U / Xbox 360); Watch Dogs (PC / PS3 / Xbox 360); ZombiU (Wii U); Warner Brothers Entertainment: F1 2012 (PC / PS3 / Xbox 360); Guardians of Middle-earth (PS3 / Xbox 360); Injustice: Gods Among Us (PS3 / Wii U / Xbox 360); Scribblenauts: Unlimited (3DS / Wii U)

- Note: This is THQ's last E3 appearance before it filed for bankruptcy.

== Notable appearances ==
=== Usher ===
R&B artist Usher performed live during Microsoft's press conference at the convention to promote Dance Central 3.

=== Flo Rida ===
During Ubisoft's press conference at the convention, Flo Rida made a surprise live performance to promote the Just Dance 4 game.

=== Danica Patrick ===
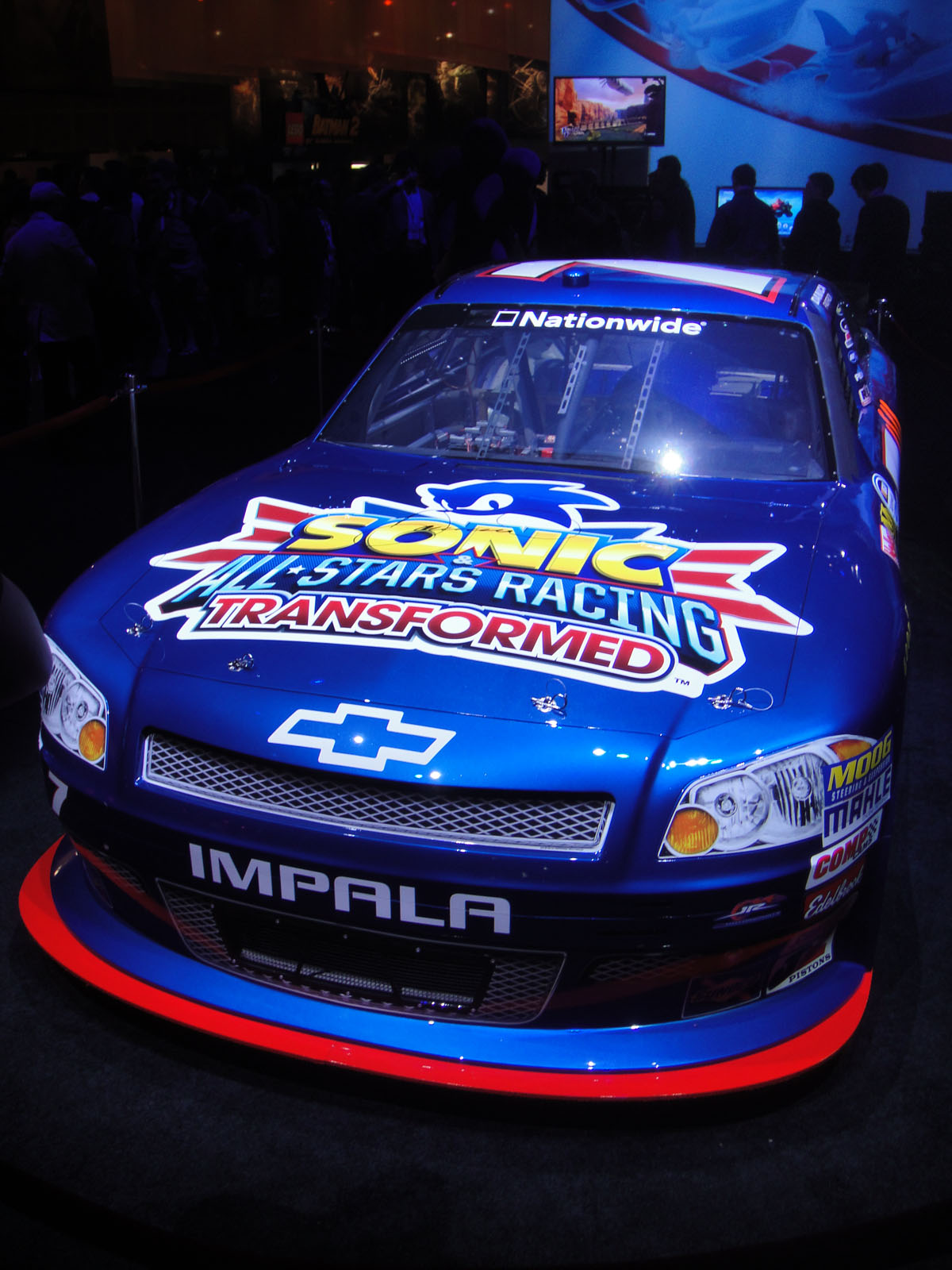
The #7 Sonic & All-Stars Racing: Transformed Chevrolet Impala NASCAR stock car displayed at Sega's E3 booth

NASCAR driver Danica Patrick was a featured guest at the convention where she helped reveal a special livery for her #7 Chevrolet Impala stock car promoting the Sonic & All-Stars Racing Transformed game in which she raced at the 2012 NASCAR Nationwide Series O'Reilly Auto Parts Challenge at Texas Motor Speedway on November 3, 2012. She was also featured as a playable character in the game.
