= Captain Olimar =

- Pikmin character
- Render of Captain Olimar from Pikmin 4 (2023)
- First appearance: Pikmin (2001)
- Created by: Shigeru Miyamoto
- Voiced by: Kazumi Totaka

In-universe information
- Species: Hocotatian
- Home: Hocotate

Captain Olimar (キャプテン・オリマー, Kyaputen Orimā) is the main character of Nintendo's Pikmin video game series created by Shigeru Miyamoto. He is the main playable character in Pikmin (2001), Pikmin 2 (2004), and Hey! Pikmin (2017), and is a major character in Pikmin 3 (2013) and Pikmin 4 (2023).

In many of these games, Olimar explores the surface of a distant planet resembling Earth with the goals of either repairing his damaged spaceship or locating treasures by means of leading and commanding the native Pikmin creatures. Olimar is married to an unnamed wife, and has an unnamed son and daughter.

Olimar also appears in other Nintendo games, notably as a playable character in the Super Smash Bros. series since Brawl.

== Appearances ==
=== Pikmin series ===
Captain Olimar was introduced in the first installment of the series, Pikmin, where he is a pilot who works for Hocotate Freight. While on vacation, his cargo transport spacecraft, the S.S. Dolphin, collides with a meteor and crash-lands onto the surface of an unknown planet. In order to escape and go home, he directs the native species of anthropomorphic plants, the titular Pikmin, to help him find the 30 parts of his ship in the 30 days his life support system has left to function. His fate depends on the player's actions. If the required 25 ship parts are collected, the S.S. Dolphin is able to successfully take off, and he returns to Hocotate. If they are not, the S.S. Dolphin crashes while attempting to take-off, and he dies upon impact, causing the Pikmin to bring his corpse to their home, the Onion, which revives him and transforms him into a Pikmin-like creature; marking the game's non-canon "bad ending".

In Pikmin 2, he returns to his home planet to learn that Hocotate Freight is in severe debt. His own ship then gets sold off, to his dismay. After discovering that something he brought back from the unknown planet is extremely valuable, his boss sends him and a co-worker, Louie, back to the planet to find more. After repaying the debt and returning to Hocotate, Olimar notices that Louie is not in the ship, and thus returns to the planet alongside his boss, to rescue him. They find Louie seemingly unconscious on top of a dangerous creature Olimar later names the "Titan Dweevil", which they defeat, and then rescue Louie; Olimar later suspects that Louie was controlling the Dweevil.

Olimar is not the main character in Pikmin 3, but he appears in the game through his journal entries that instruct the player how to use the Pikmin as well as the game mechanics, and in the multiplayer mode "Bingo Battle". Player characters Alph, Brittany, and Charlie, who crash-landed on the planet shortly after Olimar, seek to locate him in order to retrieve a crucial piece of their ship, which he took mistaking it for treasure. The final level has the player characters attempt to rescue Olimar from the game's final boss, the Plasm Wraith. In the game's Nintendo Switch port, Pikmin 3 Deluxe, Olimar appears as a playable character alongside Louie in an additional story campaign.

Olimar reappears as the only playable character in the spin-off game Hey! Pikmin, where he crash-lands on an unknown planet in his new ship, the S.S. Dolphin II. He learns that in order to bring his ship back in working order, he must collect 30,000 of a substance known as sparklium. He soon encounters the Pikmin, which he figures out can be used to collect sparklium, through making them obtain sparklium-dense treasures and seeds.

Olimar once again is not the main character in Pikmin 4. In the game, Olimar has once again crashed onto a mysterious planet, and a group of characters comprising the Rescue Corps are sent to find him. He is found throughout the game in a "leafified" state, where he transforms castaways into a similar state, is obsessed with "dandori", and often challenges the player character and Oatchi to "Dandori Battles", where he uses a "space-dog" of his own, Moss. After his fourth defeat, he collapses, and is cured by the Rescue Corps by using "glow sap". He then resides at the home base for the rest of the game. An optional side campaign, "Olimar's Shipwreck Tale", explains that Olimar's "leafified" state was caused by him crashing onto the planet for a second time, as when he attempted to take off after repairing his ship, Moss snuck inside it. She was unable to breathe outside of the planet's atmosphere, so Olimar attempted to re-land on the planet, but he fatally crashed, leading to an event similar to Pikmin's bad ending, where the Pikmin revive him by bringing him to the Onion, causing him to become a "leafling".

=== Other appearances ===
Olimar has been featured in four Super Smash Bros. games; he appears in Melee as a trophy, and in Brawl as a playable character, commanding his Pikmin to fight. He reappears as a playable character in both Super Smash Bros. for Nintendo 3DS and Wii U and Super Smash Bros. Ultimate. An Olimar amiibo, compatible with the games, was released on September 11, 2014. Although not a playable character, five Miis can reenact Olimar and four Pikmin (blue, red, yellow, and white, in that order of players) in Pikmin Adventure, a minigame in Nintendo Land.

== Concept and creation ==
Olimar is an extremely small humanoid alien "Hocotatian" with a large nose, wearing a spacesuit and a circular space helmet with an antenna. Standing 19 mm (0.75 in) tall, Olimar was named after Mario; in Japanese, the name "Olimar" (オリマー, Orimā) is an anagram of "Mario" (マリオ) Captain Olimar was a late addition in Pikmin; Miyamoto said that since during the initial development of the game, the Pikmin would be utilized as weapons to be shot by the player themselves, "it wouldn't be interesting enough" to have a player character. Although Olimar was a late addition to Pikmin, his role as the leader of the Pikmin was included since the original conception of the game. Miyamoto stated that he "started thinking about a game about lots of small people carrying things in a line, following a leader, with everyone going in the same direction", in an interview with The Telegraph.

In an interview with 4Gamer, Miyamoto revealed that he aimed to make Olimar simple to control, like a cursor. He also revealed that while the decision to include more than two main characters in Pikmin 3 was partially his, the decision for them to be new characters, instead of old ones such as Olimar, was an "on the spot" choice by the team, without his input. Despite this, he assumed that Olimar would appear around halfway through the game.

== Critical reception ==
Writing for The Observer, Tom Chatfield listed Olimar as one of his top ten video game characters, due to him uniquely being a standard "salaried employee... [who is] married with a wife and children". Writing for Nintendo World Report, Steven Rodriguez praised his characterization in Pikmin, enjoying the way his journal entries "[cause] his sense of isolation, discovery, and beauty to become ours – all without long cinemas or dialog." Robin Wilde, writing for Nintendojo, compared Olimar to Charles Marlow from the 1899 novella Heart of Darkness, as they both use others to "do their bidding". Wilde notes, however, that unlike Marlow, who treats his workers cruelly, Olimar is much more compassionate, is saddened if Pikmin perish, and is the one who "brings [them] life and purpose". He also argues that once Olimar helps "create a society capable of sustaining [them,]" they no longer need him. Kotaku writer Peter Tieryas offered a darker interpretation, describing Olimar as a "villainous alien intruder" in Pikmin, since his crash-landing disrupts the planet's natural order, he kills and harvests the corpses of species such as Bulborbs—which he describes as "minding their own business"—and he "greedily" decides to kill the "innocent" Emperor Bulblax to retrieve his safe. Tieryas notes that while he does show doubts about his actions, he also tries to justify them.

Fellow Kotaku writer Ian Walker argued that Olimar was one of the most powerful characters in the Super Smash Bros. series, noting community reactions, and comparing him to Brawl's Meta Knight. Walker later discussed a nerf to Olimar in Ultimate, criticizing the changes to his shield, stating "Olimar's shield issues... fly directly in the face of basic game mechanics." Eurogamer writer Tom Bramwell praised his Brawl appearance, calling his fighting style "particularly eye-catching", since he "[uses] an army of Pikmin". His Final Smash was also his favorite in the game. IGN ranked him as the 17th best Super Smash Bros. character, describing him as being a character not suited for beginners, but also one that "[rewards] those who learn the abilities of each [Pikmin type]." They also considered him to be a "wonderful example of how even the most unlikely of characters can make for a great Smash fighter."
