= Pikmin Bloom =

2021 mobile game

- Developers: Niantic (2021—2025); Scopely Explore (2025—present)
- Publishers: Niantic (2021—2025); Scopely (2025—present)
- Director: Tatsuo Nomura
- Series: Pikmin
- Platforms: iOS, Android
- Release: AU/SEA: October 26, 2021; NA: October 28, 2021; JP: November 1, 2021; EU/WW: November 2, 2021
- Genres: Augmented reality, location-based game

Pikmin Bloom is a 2021 augmented reality video game developed and published by Niantic for Android and iOS. It is a spin-off of Nintendo's Pikmin series and Niantic's second collaboration with the company.

Similar to Pokémon Go, Pikmin Bloom rewards players for spending time outside. The player's real-world movements correlate to the production of items for Pikmin creatures. The game's worldwide rollout began in late October 2021.

== Gameplay ==
Pikmin Bloom is an augmented reality mobile game in the Pikmin series. For wandering and spending time outside, players are rewarded with items that can either grow or feed Pikmin creatures that appeared throughout the main Pikmin games.

The walking player is depicted as a Nintendo Account Mii (or one with limited customization for those without such an account) leading Pikmin, creating a trail of blossoming flowers on the map with flower petals collected from Pikmin, and the Pikmin can find items. This includes fruit and costumes. The Pikmin grow flowers on their heads when fed nectar, which in turn produces more flower petals, and then plant more flowers on the map. Local landmarks are represented as either big flowers, from which flower nectar can be collected, or as mushroom, which can be destroyed by Pikmin collaboratively with other players in a mushroom battle. There are also planned, collaborative multiplayer events and challenges involving large flowers.

The game is free-to-play. Like Niantic's Pokémon Go, the player can use real-world money to purchase virtual coins to boost progress.

The player can take real photographs with virtual Pikmin. The lifelogging component, inspired by Olimar's daily ship logs from the first Pikmin game, encourages the player to make and caption photos for daily calendar entries. The game app connects with Apple Health and Google Fit to count steps but has no smartwatch connection.

== Development and release ==
Niantic developed Pikmin Bloom under license from Nintendo after having previously collaborated on Pokémon Go.

It was first announced in 2021. Global rollout began in Australia and Singapore on October 27, 2021, North and South America on October 28, Japan on November 1, and lastly it was available worldwide by November 2.

In May 2025, Scopely acquired Niantic, with Pikmin Bloom as one in three games retained by Niantic in the sale.

In a Nintendo Direct on November 1, 2026, Nintendo announced an update for the app, titled "Secret Caves", featuring caves that groups of Pikmin can explore, enemies from previous Pikmin games, and functionality with Pikmin 4 – Nintendo Switch 2 Edition + Dandori Academy; the update is scheduled to release in late 2026.

== Reception ==
Reception

Aggregate score
Aggregator	Score
Metacritic	65/100

Review scores
Publication	Score
Destructoid	5/10
Nintendo Life	8/10
PCMag	3.5/5
The Guardian	4/5

Pikmin Bloom received "mixed or average" reviews from critics, according to the review aggregation website Metacritic. Early reviewers likened Pikmin Bloom to a gamified fitness experience, similar to fitness apps that convert daily steps taken into coins and minigames. Jess Reyes of Digital Trends wrote that Pikmin Bloom was "more a Nintendo fitness app than a video game", comparing it to Pokémon Go.

Some Android users using Android 11 or 12 at the game's launch reported delayed notifications including SMS messages. Initial reports of the delayed notifications were reported during beta testing. Niantic acknowledged the issues on November 5 and released two updates which minimize the delayed notifications.

Pikmin Bloom was downloaded two million times in two weeks after its launch, and as of April 2024, the game had grossed $44 million since its release.

== See also ==
- 2021 in video games
