= Pikmin 4 =

2023 video game

- Box art
- Developers: Nintendo EPD; Eighting
- Publisher: Nintendo
- Directors: Yuji Kando; Tetsushi Tsunoda
- Producer: Takashi Tezuka
- Designers: Yutaka Hiramuki; Taku Matoba
- Programmer: Yuji Kando
- Artists: Michiho Ito; Hiromu Takemura
- Writers: Yutaka Hiramuki; Shinya Kubota
- Composers: Kenta Nagata; Asuka Hayazaki; Soshi Abe
- Series: Pikmin
- Engine: Unreal Engine 4
- Platforms: Nintendo Switch; Nintendo Switch 2
- Release: Nintendo Switch; July 21, 2023; Nintendo Switch 2 November 12, 2026
- Genres: Real-time strategy, puzzle
- Modes: Single-player, multiplayer

Pikmin 4 is a 2023 real-time strategy video game co-developed by Nintendo EPD and Eighting, and published by Nintendo. It is the fourth main installment of the Pikmin series, following Pikmin 3 (2013), and the fifth installment overall. It was released on the Nintendo Switch on July 21, 2023.

The game features a customizable playable character, two new species of Pikmin, and Night Expeditions. In the story, the player assumes the role of a recently recruited member of the Rescue Corps, whose members need rescuing following an unsuccessful attempt to save Captain Olimar. The events of Olimar's crash serve as an alternate retelling of the events of Pikmin (2001). It is currently unknown where Pikmin 4 fits into the timeline of the other main series games.

Pikmin 4 received positive reviews from critics, with praise for the game's level design, visuals, music, large amount of content, and accessibility to newcomers, while also receiving some criticism for its low difficulty and limited multiplayer options. The game was commercially successful, selling over three million units worldwide, making it the best-selling game in the series. An enhanced version for the Nintendo Switch 2, titled Pikmin 4 – Nintendo Switch 2 Edition + Dandori Academy was released on November 12, 2026.

== Gameplay ==
A development photo of a group of Pikmin fighting a Bulborb, showing off the new perspective.

The player controls a minuscule character who takes command of squads of Pikmin to explore various areas, fight enemies, secure treasures, and solve puzzles. Pikmin can be directed to perform various tasks, such as carrying objects and fighting enemies, and have individual weaknesses and strengths. For example, Red Pikmin are invulnerable to fire, Blue Pikmin can walk underwater, and Winged Pikmin can lift up objects and float over hazards. The player can switch between different species of Pikmin to adapt to the situation and deal with enemies and hazards. The camera allows for a full view of the area around the player character, with the perspective being able to be much closer to the ground than in previous games.

Pikmin 4 retains all Pikmin types from previous games besides Bulbmin and Mushroom Pikmin, and introduces two new species: Ice Pikmin, which are invulnerable to being frozen and can freeze enemies and bodies of water; and Glow Pikmin, which can be operated in caves and are used during the Night Expeditions. The player can also command a canine creature called Oatchi to help with exploration. Like the Pikmin, Oatchi can be directed to carry objects and attack enemies, but can also help bash breakable objects, sniff out objectives such as treasure, and transport both the player character and Pikmin around the map and over bodies of water; in some places, the player can directly control Oatchi to solve puzzles.

The game's single-player mode introduces new features to the series. Players can customize their character with different facial features and uniform colors, and have access to a hub base that provides different activities - such as the ability to upgrade equipment, as well as Oatchi and his abilities after it gains experience during exploration. Treasures collected in different areas contribute to a resource known as Sparklium, which is needed to expand the number of maps the player can explore. The main missions include finding Captain Olimar and later Louie, and side missions come from castaways brought back to the hub base. Practice Mode trains the player to defeat enemies.

While exploring an area during a Day, the player is limited in the number of Pikmin they can deploy for exploration. The player can initially deploy 20 Pikmin at a time, with Flarlic upgrades increasing the limit to a maximum of 100. Collecting Flarlic when the Pikmin limit is at a hundred will instead produce Nectar and Ultra-Spicy Nectar. In addition, players can redeploy their transport craft and the Onion to previously discovered landing sites to deploy Pikmin quickly and speed up the acquisition of treasures and combat spoils. Caves, a feature first introduced in Pikmin 2, return, but the player is now able to change their Pikmin squad before entering. Unlike Pikmin 2, time is not paused while exploring a cave, but instead moves at 1/6; like in Pikmin 2, the spoils of combat can be recovered, but are worth much less Sparklium than treasure. A rewind feature allows the player to undo mistakes or play differently than before.

Specific maps allow players to explore areas at night, which are known as Night Expeditions. In this mode, which functions similar to tower defense games, players are restricted to using only Glow Pikmin to explore maps and recover resources, all while fighting enemies who are drawn to the Glow Pikmin's nest, called a Lumiknoll.

The main story can be played in either single-player or alongside a second player in co-op, and there is also a competitive multiplayer mode called Dandori Battle, derived from Dandori, a Japanese word for efficient planning. In Dandori Battles, the player must secure as much spoils and treasures in an arena before their opponent can; both sides can collect Pikmin to help them and have their own Oatchi partner. Two players can partake in Dandori Battles together, either working together against the computer or against each other.

In addition to the main story, a new side mode is unlocked during the story, called "Olimar's Shipwreck Tale". The player takes control of Olimar prior to the events of the main story, shortly after crash-landing on the planet, and must collect the S.S. Dolphin's 30 missing ship parts. Compared to the base game, Olimar's Shipwreck Tale has several differences in gameplay. It features only Red, Blue, and Yellow Pikmin, Moss instead of Oatchi as a companion, shorter days, no caves or Dandori Challenges/Battles, progress-based upgrades and items, and a time limit of 15 days before Olimar's life-support functions fail. In addition, area layouts have been changed drastically to accommodate for the different gameplay, with new enemy placements, hazards removed/added, new traversal options, and some sections of an area being inaccessible.

An update to the game released on November 11, 2025 allows the player to select from multiple difficulty modes, including "Relaxed”, in which enemies will not attack the player first, and "Fierce" which limits Pikmin to a limit of 60 at once, similar to Pikmin 3 Deluxe's "Ultra-Spicy" difficulty, and also increases enemy health. This same update also added in "Decor Pikmin" which are Pikmin hidden around the areas with costumes. Players can transfer their Pikmin 4 "Decor Pikmin" to Pikmin Bloom. A "roll over" feature has also been added that allows players to take the unlocked gears, Oatchi Pup Drive and Swallow ability, and Onions from another save file, as well as skipping the entire first day and any other tutorial sequences.

Pikmin 4 — Nintendo Switch 2 Edition + Dandori Academy, released on November 12, 2026, included new features in a Switch 2 exclusive upgrade pack such as voice commands for Oatchi, Dandori Academy levels, and an “exam” mode that takes place Friday, Saturday, and Sunday. Players can connect their Pikmin Bloom Nintendo account to Pikmin 4 to receive special postcards and cave maps in Pikmin Bloom.

== Plot ==
Seemingly diverging from the events of the prior installments, (Note: The events of Olimar's crash serve as an alternate retelling of the events of Pikmin (2001). It is currently unknown where Pikmin 4 fits into the timeline of the other main series games, though 2 and 3 are implied to be future events.) Captain Olimar travels to PNF-404, an Earth-like planet, aboard his ship the S.S. Dolphin. A freak accident causes his ship to crash-land, and he is forced to recruit Pikmin to help him find the ship's missing parts. During his search, Olimar bonds with a dog-like creature that he names Moss. After finding his ship's missing radio within the interior of the Hero's Hideaway, Olimar transmits an SOS call along with his voyage logs, but mysteriously disappears after continuing his search for the missing parts.

The Rescue Corps, an intergalactic rescue organization, receives his emergency call and sends a team to PNF-404 led by Captain Shepherd to find and rescue Olimar. However, the ship malfunctions upon reaching the planet, forcing the crew to eject before it crash lands on the surface. The Rescue Corps assigns its newest recruit, the player character, to find the missing Rescue Corps members and complete the mission. Upon reaching the planet, the recruit encounters Shepherd's rescue pup, a dog-like creature called Oatchi, who bonds with them. After rescuing Shepherd and the team's communication officer Collin, the recruit finds that the Rescue Corps' ship has run out of power. With help from Pikmin near the ship's crash site, the recruit recovers several objects which contain a resource known as Sparklium, which can fuel the ship.

The recruit, accompanied by the Pikmin and Oatchi, begins exploring the area to find the other Rescue Corps members, along the way discovering that several treasure hunters and explorers came to the planet after picking up Olimar's signal, but also became castaways. Shepherd instructs the recruit to locate and rescue castaways alongside their primary objectives.

During further exploration, the Rescue Corps come across a mysterious figure who is accompanied by Moss. The figure, known as a "leafling", is exhibiting an unknown condition that has caused them to become hairy and sprout leaves from all over their head, and also given them the ability to breathe oxygen, which is normally poisonous to those stuck on the planet. As the figure has infected several castaways with the same condition through the Onions, the Rescue Corps' chief medic Yonny works to produce a cure after he is rescued. In the meantime, the Rescue Corps come across the S.S. Dolphin, finding it was repaired but crashed after taking off. They soon realize the mysterious figure is Olimar, who became infected after a failed attempt to escape PNF-404 and was beamed up to an Onion by the Pikmin. Using Yonny's cure, the recruit treats the infected and cures their condition, as well as Olimar after battling and defeating him in a Dandori battle, returning him to normal.

With their mission complete, the Rescue Corps attempt to leave PNF-404, but Shepherd discovers that Oatchi has caught an illness involving a leaf similar to that of a Pikmin sprouting on his tail, making it impossible to leave the planet. As Yonny's cure is ineffective in treating Oatchi, Olimar advises the group to return to the planet's surface, and reveals Moss has the same condition, which was the cause of his failed escape after Moss snuck into his cargo hold. On the surface, the Rescue Corps work to find ingredients for a new cure while searching for more castaways, particularly the veterinarian Nelle from Koppai.

Exploration soon turns up a giant dog, the Ancient Sirehound, who is similar in species to Oatchi and Moss, and which Yonny believes it can provide a key ingredient for the cure. While searching for it, the recruit finds it hiding in a cave where Olimar's partner, Louie, had been hiding after coming to the planet to search for food. After defeating him and the dog, the recruit recovers both him and some DNA from the dog's collar, providing the final ingredient for curing Oatchi. After discovering that Moss cannot be cured, Olimar determines that she was born on the planet and decides to leave her behind with the Pikmin. The Rescue Corps agree and depart with the others, while Olimar leaves with the Dolphin. Meanwhile, Moss goes exploring with the Pikmin, pursued eagerly by the now-tamed Ancient Sirehound.

== Development ==
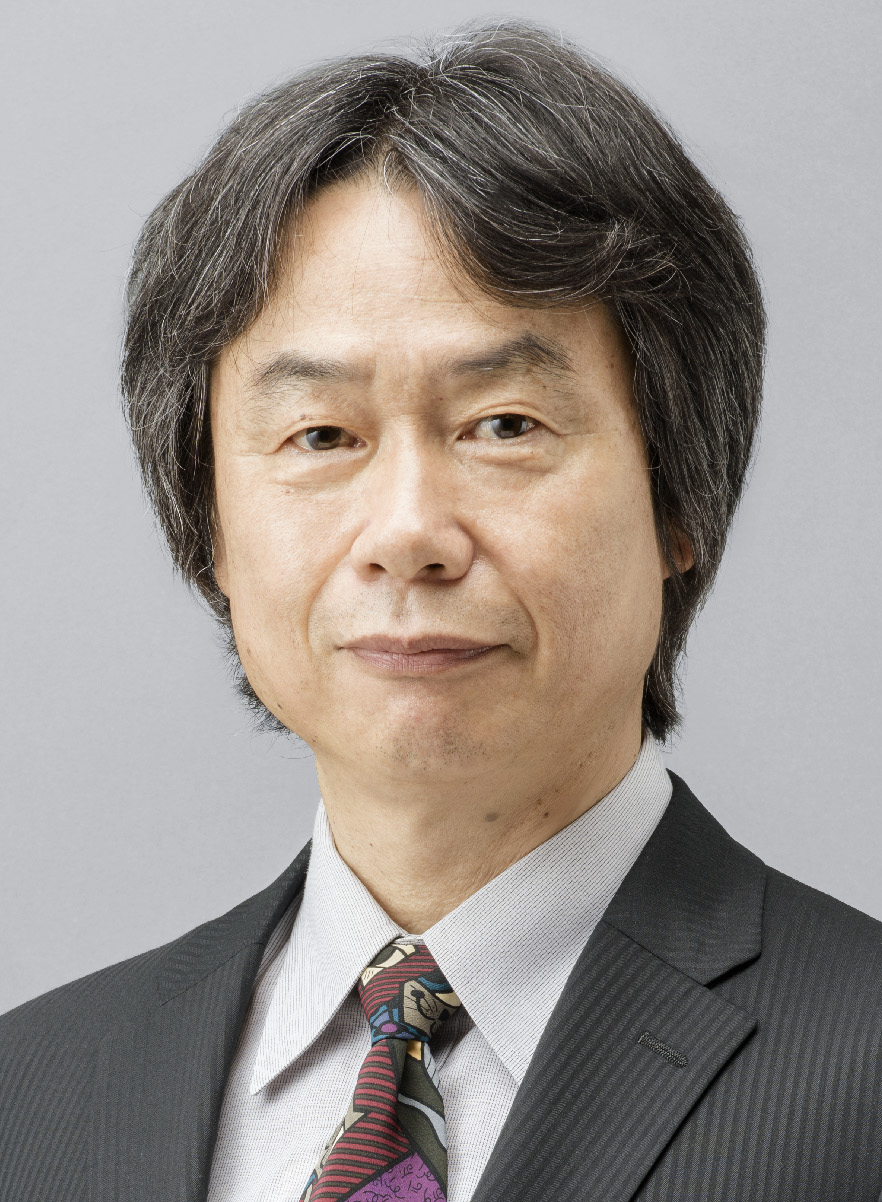
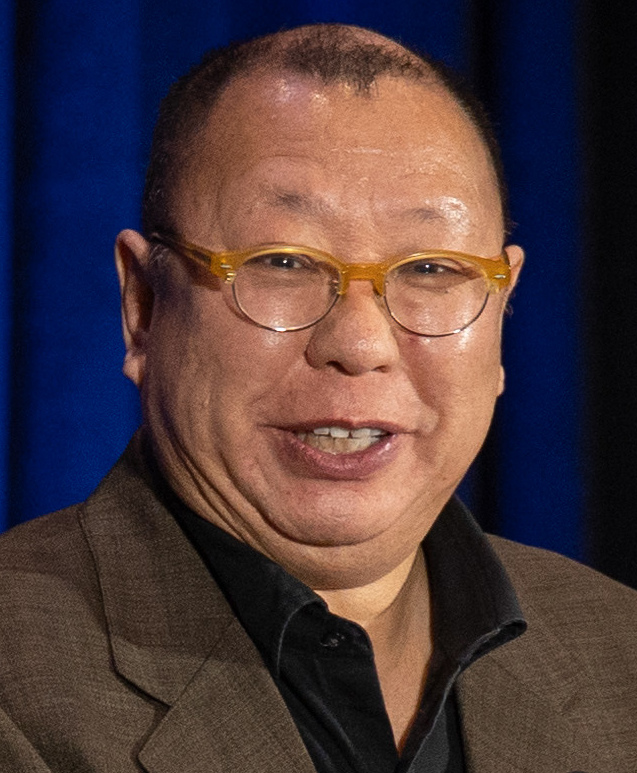
General producer Shigeru Miyamoto (left, pictured in 2015) and producer Takashi Tezuka (right, pictured in 2024)

On September 7, 2015, Pikmin creator Shigeru Miyamoto confirmed to Eurogamer that Pikmin 4 was in development, and "very close to completion". On July 7, 2016, Miyamoto said in an E3 interview with Game Rant that Pikmin 4 was still in development, though at a lower priority. On June 19, 2017, Miyamoto reassured Eurogamer that the game was still "progressing". In the years to follow, the game was widely considered vaporware until it was officially unveiled on September 13, 2022.

Pikmin 4 was developed using Unreal Engine 4, its first use in an internally developed Nintendo EPD game, although the game was co-developed with Eighting. Lead staff include veteran Pikmin developer Yuji Kando, who was one of the two directors of Pikmin 3 and returned as chief director and programming director; Yutaka Hiramuki as game design and lead writer, responsible for the level design and story similarly to his responsibilities on Pikmin 3; Takashi Tezuka, who returned as the mainline series producer, a role he has held since Pikmin 2, and Shigeru Miyamoto, who returned as the general producer, the same position he held in Pikmin 3.

Throughout the series, two styles of gameplay had emerged: a shorter, more focused challenge that encourages resource management and multitasking with an ultimate time limit, seen in Pikmin (2001) and Pikmin 3, and a longer experience featuring the collection of treasures within dangerous underground caves that focus more on the aspect of resource management without time limits in Pikmin 2. In Pikmin 4, the team aimed to appease fans of both gameplay types by trying to mix both styles into one, as well as making a more approachable and accessible game, considering the series' relative struggle in reaching general audiences. Additionally, the team wanted to incorporate new and exciting elements as selling points, such as Oatchi. This resulted in an extended development period, with many discussions among staff.

== Release ==
Pikmin 4 was announced by Shigeru Miyamoto in a Nintendo Direct on September 13, 2022. The teaser trailer gives a brief glimpse of the game's environment, without any gameplay or story details. Nintendo announced that the Pikmin T-shirt worn by Miyamoto during the announcement would be released at the Nintendo New York store and Nintendo's website. In the February 8, 2023, Nintendo Direct, Pikmin 4 was revealed to launch on July 21, 2023. A demo was released on June 29, 2023. In the September 2026 Nintendo Direct, Nintendo announced a Nintendo Switch 2 Edition of the game, released on November 12, 2026. Nintendo, in a Direct on November 1, (declared "Pikmin Day" in the same Direct) announced a demo of the Switch 2 edition that released November 2, 2026.

Less than two weeks before the release of Pikmin 4, fans were purchasing 15-second slots on billboards in New York City's Times Square to advertise the game. Submissions from the Pikmin community included meme images advertising Pikmin 4.

=== Fiddlebert ===
Original image posted on Reddit depicting Fiddlebert and Captain Olimar in Pikmin

On June 27, 2023, less than a month before the release of Pikmin 4, members of the Pikmin community on Reddit created a fictional meme character named "Fiddlebert", depicted as a small green variant of Captain Olimar who spoke Lithuanian and was portrayed as a "rushed" second player character in the original Pikmin. Fans also claimed that Fiddlebert had existed in early versions of Pikmin but had been removed due to Nintendo's alleged disapproval of the character's malevolent personality, parodying popular gaming rumors.

The joke expanded to include false methods of "unlocking" Fiddlebert in the original Pikmin game for the GameCube, such as connecting a second controller and completing the game within six in-game days. Additional claims humorously suggested that Fiddlebert had appeared in spin-off titles on platforms such as the Nintendo 3DS, which were said to have sold poorly. The character was also associated with recurring catchphrases, including "Fiddle me this, Olimar".

== Reception ==
Reception

Aggregate scores
Aggregator	Score
Metacritic	87/100
OpenCritic	96% recommend 92% recommend(NS2) (Note: Based on 14 reviews.)

Review scores
Publication	Score
Destructoid	9.5/10
Digital Trends	4/5
Eurogamer	5/5
Famitsu	35/40
Game Informer	9/10
GameSpot	7/10
GamesRadar+	4.5/5
IGN	9/10
Nintendo Life	9/10
Nintendo World Report	9/10
PCMag	4.5/5
Video Games Chronicle	4/5
VG247	4/5
Siliconera	10/10

Pikmin 4 received "generally favorable" reviews, according to review aggregator website Metacritic, where it has a score of 87/100 based on 122 reviews. Fellow review aggregator OpenCritic assessed that the game received "mighty" support, being recommended by 96% of critics.

Writing for Nintendo Life, PJ O'Reilly praised the game's level design, graphics, and performance in both handheld and docked mode. Andrew Webster of The Verge enjoyed the nighttime excursions and puzzles present in Pikmin 4, writing "With the clock ticking down, these more focused challenges are a nice change of pace from the laid-back standard gameplay, even if I don't quite understand why they exist narratively".

While liking the laid-back nature of gameplay, Ars Technica's Kyle Orland criticized the lack of navigation tools, writing that it made multitasking cumbersome. He writes, "The most notable omission is a mini-map; without it, I found myself constantly jumping into the pause menu to figure out how to find and manage distinct groups of Pikmin spread around the complex layered environments". Emily Price of Polygon felt that the title framed the world in an exciting way, making ordinary objects seem "wonderous".

The Nintendo Switch 2 edition was review bombed on Metacritic due to factors such as slower load times, frame rate still being capped at 30 fps, and reused content, with many claiming it to be a downgrade from the original. This dropped the game's user score to 1.8, indicating "overwhelming dislike", making it the lowest-rated Nintendo Switch 2 game on the platform.

=== Sales ===
In Japan, Pikmin 4 had the best launch week of the series, selling 401,853 physical units, a number larger than the first week sales of the three previous games of the franchise combined. As of November 10, 2026, Pikmin 4 has sold 3.48 million copies worldwide, with 1.87 million sold in Japan, and 1.61 million sold elsewhere.

=== Awards ===
Awards and nominations
Year	Ceremony	Category	Result	Ref.
2023	Gamescom	Most Wholesome	Won	
2023	Golden Joystick Awards	Nintendo Game of the Year	Nominated	
2023	The Game Awards 2023	Best Family Game	Nominated	
2023	The Game Awards 2023	Best Sim/Strategy Game	Won	
2024	13th New York Game Awards	Central Park Children's Zoo Award for Best Kids Game	Nominated	

== See also ==
- List of Nintendo Switch games
- 2023 in video games
