= Strawberry Flower =

Japanese music duo

- Origin: Japan
- Genre: Pop
- Years active: 2001–2004, 2015
- Label: Toshiba-EMI
- Past members: Tomoe Watanabe; Takeshi Tomozuma (Gan Matsumoto)

Strawberry Flower was a Japanese music duo, mostly known for their work with Nintendo in creating songs for TV commercials for the Pikmin franchise. Formed in late 2001 specifically to create a song for TV advertisements for Pikmin, Strawberry Flower made the song "Ai no Uta". It became a sleeper hit, getting to #2 in the Japanese charts and becoming one of the best-selling singles in Japan in 2002. They later followed with more Pikmin-related single releases until 2004, totalling 1 million singles sold in their home country.

Although they kept largely inactive ever since, they briefly reunited in 2015 for the song "arukuhayasade", released independently and with no ties to Pikmin. Most of their songs were released exclusively in Japan, but they got worldwide exposure in 2008, with the inclusion of two of their songs in the game Super Smash Bros. Brawl's soundtrack, gathering a cult following.

== History ==
=== 2001–2002: Formation and "Ai no Uta" ===
In 2001, Nintendo enlisted singer instrumentist Gan Matsumoto, credited as Takeshi Tomozuma in the project, to create music to be used in their then-upcoming GameCube title Pikmin, created by Shigeru Miyamoto. Tomozuma came up with "Ai no Uta", and then called Tomoe Watanabe to record vocals, that way, forming the Strawberry Flower duo. The song was released as a single in December of that same year, climbing to #2 in the Oricon charts in January 2002, becoming a massive hit and selling over 600,000 copies, outselling Japanese sales of Pikmin itself. The song did boost the game's sales though, eventually hitting over 500,000 copies sold in the country. "Ai no Uta" would prove itself a massive hit, being the 8th best selling single in 2002 in Japan, according to Oricon.

"Ai no Uta"'s lyrics tie in to the games, talking about the events from the game from the Pikmin's point of view. A version for the TV commercials, more directly talking about the Pikmin was also recorded, both versions were included in the Pikmin World soundtrack, released in May 2002. Meanwhile, the single release had a B-side called "Namida ga Afureta", which talks about the game's events from Olimar's point of view. This one is exclusive to the "Ai no Uta" single.

Strawberry Flower's second single was a collection of three instrumental remixes of "Ai no Uta" titled "Pikmin Dance", released under the name "Strawberry Music Group". In 2002, a French version entitled "Vos Meilleurs Amis" was released as a single in France by Virgin France, also used in Pikmin TV commercials in the country. The song was recorded by a French singer named Juliette Katz. A shortened version of it, used in the ads, was also included in Pikmin World.

=== 2004: "Tane no Uta" ===
Nintendo commissioned Strawberry Flower for promotional Pikmin music once again, this time, for TV commercials for the GameCube title Pikmin 2. The resulting single was "Tane no Uta", released in May 2004, based on the Japanese children's nursery rhyme "Koganemushi", with the lyrics adapted to talk about each Pikmin color.

The CD single also came with a cover of the Japanese nursery rhyme "Shabondama" and a remix of "Ai no Uta", with re-recorded vocals and instrumentation.

Just like "Ai no Uta" in the first game, "Tane no Uta" was not actually included in Pikmin 2 in any form. However, "Ai no Uta" was included in this game as an easter egg.

=== 2005–2014: Hiatus and worldwide exposure ===
Ever since "Tane no Uta", Strawberry Flower would not return to work with Nintendo or Pikmin anymore with new songs, despite the Pikmin series getting new installments in the following years.

However, "Ai no Uta" and "Tane no Uta" would be reused by Nintendo in other projects. The first of them was the 2008 crossover fighting game Super Smash Bros. Brawl, where both songs were included as background music for the Pikmin-themed Distant Planet stage. The French version of "Ai no Uta" was also included. With the worldwide release of the game, that marked Strawberry Flower's first appearance worldwide, leading to a cult following among international Pikmin fans. Those songs did not return in future Super Smash Bros. games.

With the release of Pikmin 3 in 2013, "Ai no Uta" was once again used in advertisements for the game. This currently stands as the latest usage of Strawberry Flower music in Pikmin media.

=== 2015: Brief reunion and "arukuhayasade" ===
February 2015 marked a brief reunion for the band with the single "arukuhayasade". It was their first released independently and worldwide, and was also the first with no ties to Pikmin or Nintendo, being written as a tie-in to a book of the same name.

== Discography ==
=== Singles ===
List of singles, with selected chart positions and certifications, showing year released and album name
| Title | Year | Peak chart positions | | Album |
| Title | Year | JP (Weekly) | JP (Yearly) | Album |
|---|---|---|---|---|
| "Ai no Uta" | 2001 | 2 | 8 | Pikmin World |
| "Pikmin Dance" | 2002 | - | - | N/A (tie-in to Pikmin) |
| "Tane no Uta" | 2004 | 28 | - | N/A (tie-in to Pikmin 2) |
| "arukuhayasade" | 2015 | - | - | N/A |
"—" denotes a recording that did not chart or was not released in that territory.
