= Ai no Uta (Strawberry Flower song) =

Single by Strawberry Flower

from the album Pikmin World
- Released: December 6, 2001
- Genre: Pop
- Length: 3:04
- Label: Toshiba-EMI
- Composer(s): Strawberry Flower
- Producer(s): Strawberry Flower

Strawberry Flower singles chronology
| "Ai no Uta" (2001) | "Pikmin Dance" (2002) |

"Ai no Uta" (愛のうた, Song of Love) is a song recorded by Strawberry Flower for Japanese TV commercials of the GameCube game Pikmin. It was written and produced by band member Takeshi Tomozuma. The song was later included in the "Pikmin World" soundtrack album, in three different versions. It is from the point-of-view of the Pikmin creatures.

"Ai no Uta" became one of the biggest singles in Japan in 2002, reaching #2 on the Oricon Weekly charts and managing to be one of the best-selling singles in the country that year.

== Concept and creation ==
Ai no Uta originally came about as a result of Nintendo enlisting Gan Matsumoto, credited Takeshi Tomozuma, to make music for the upcoming Pikmin. Tomozuma first came up with Ai no Uta, enlisting singer Tomoe Watanabe to contribute vocals and forming Strawberry Flower. The song was not actually featured in the game itself, instead being used as part of the game's marketing campaign. The song is a pop ballad driven by guitar and accordion, with soft vocals by Tomoe Watanabe. Lyrically, the song talks about the Pikmin game from the Pikmin's point of view, describing their actions, sacrifice, and devotion to the game's protagonist, Captain Olimar, although neither Pikmin nor Captain Olimar are mentioned by name in the song's main version.

The music video was shot September 26, 2001.

== Reception ==
Ai no Uta was well-received by children and adults alike. A Famitsu writer praised the lyrics and the story of the song, discussing how the story evoked sympathetic imagery of office workers.

Initial shipments of the record exceeded 200,000, with 30,000 additional being ordered by 7 December 2001. By 20 December, it had exceeded 460,000 units sold, and by June 2002 900,000.

"Ai no Uta" debuted at #2 on the Oricon Weekly Singles Chart, which is the highest the song reached.

== Other versions and appearances ==
A cover of the song was released in France with the title "Vos Meilleurs Amis - Songs of Love". It was featured in Pikmin 2 as an Easter egg. It was included in the 2008 crossover fighting video game Super Smash Bros. Brawl. It was also used to advertise the 2013 Pikmin 3 release.

== Track listing ==
Retrieved from Oricon:

1. Ai no Uta (愛のうた, Song of Love)
2. Namida ga Afureta (涙があふれた, Tears Overflowing)
3. Ai no Uta (愛のうた) (Instrumental)
