= Takashi Tezuka =

Japanese video game designer (born 1960)

- 手塚 卓志
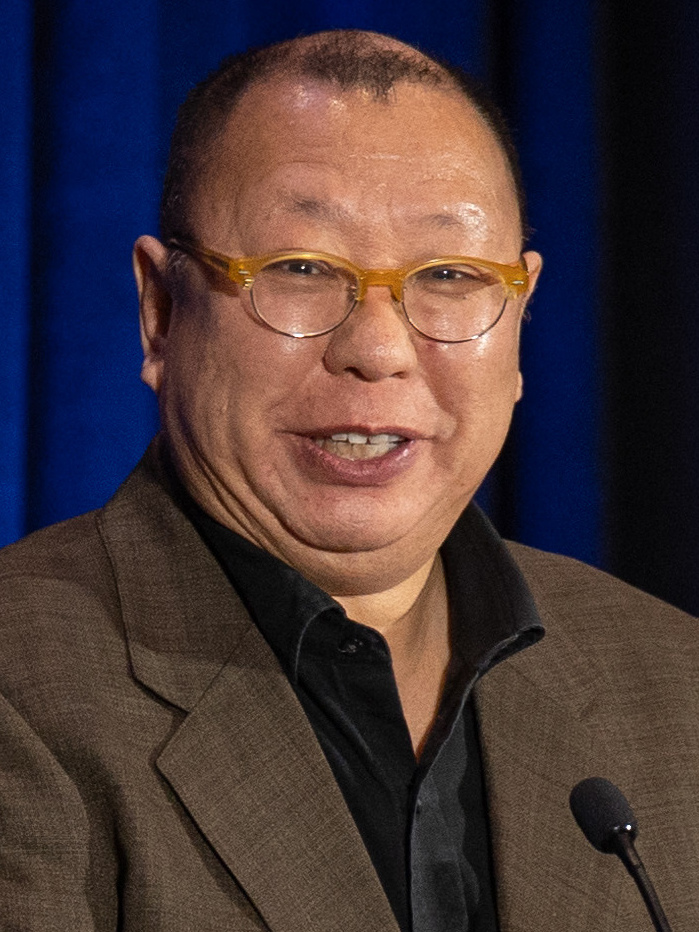
- Tezuka in 2024
- Born: November 17, 1960 (age 66); Osaka, Japan
- Other name: Ten Ten
- Education: Osaka University of Arts
- Occupations: Game designer; director; producer
- Employer: Nintendo (since 1984)
- Known for: Super Mario; The Legend of Zelda; Yoshi; Pikmin
- Title: General Manager at Nintendo EAD (2000-2015); Senior Officer at Nintendo EPD (2015-); Executive Officer at Nintendo (2018-2026)

Takashi Tezuka (手塚 卓志, Tezuka Takashi; born November 17, 1960), nicknamed Ten Ten, is a Japanese video game designer, director and producer. Since 1984, he has directed, produced, or supervised development of numerous games released by Nintendo. He is currently a senior officer of their Entertainment Planning & Development division, and was an executive officer of the company board of directors between 2018 and 2026.

Tezuka assisted designer Shigeru Miyamoto on the platformer game Super Mario Bros. (1985) for the Nintendo Entertainment System (NES). The game was incredibly innovative and influential to the medium; it began the Super Mario game series, and revived the North American gaming industry after it had suffered a recession in 1983. Tezuka wrote for and helped Miyamoto design the action-adventure game The Legend of Zelda (1986), which began the Zelda series. The two have had a creative partnership on many projects in the four decades since.

While directing Super Mario Bros. 3 (1988) for the NES and Super Mario World (1990) for the Super Nintendo Entertainment System (SNES), Tezuka co-designed the dinosaur character Yoshi, who became a staple of the Mario and Yoshi series. He then directed The Legend of Zelda: A Link to the Past (1991) for the SNES, The Legend of Zelda: Link's Awakening (1993) for the Game Boy, and Yoshi's Island (1995) for the SNES. His last game design credit was for Super Mario 64 (1996) for the Nintendo 64. Tezuka has since worked in managerial roles on games, rather than as a hands-on designer. Such titles include Animal Crossing (2001) for the Nintendo 64 and GameCube, The Legend of Zelda: The Wind Waker (2002) for the GameCube, Super Mario Galaxy 2 (2010) for the Wii, and The Legend of Zelda: Breath of the Wild (2017) for the Wii U and Nintendo Switch. All the aforementioned titles are considered by many outlets to be some of the best, most innovative, or most influential games ever released.

== Early life ==
Takashi Tezuka was born on November 17, 1960. His nickname is "Ten Ten", which he has been called in some game credits. In the 1980s, he studied at the Design Department of the Osaka University of Arts. He became skilled at designing packaging of consumer goods featuring branding of various characters. However, Tezuka was uninterested in jobs like advertising—where someone has to design a product according to a client's specifications—which design students in Japan typically entered after graduating. His friend, meanwhile, applied to work at video game company Nintendo, which made Tezuka interested in joining them too; he wanted to work in "jobs related to leisure and recreation", rather than necessarily work in gaming. Tezuka was not very knowledgeable about gaming when he applied, and was not even aware of Pac-Man (1980).

== Career ==
=== Punch-Out!! and Devil World (1984) ===
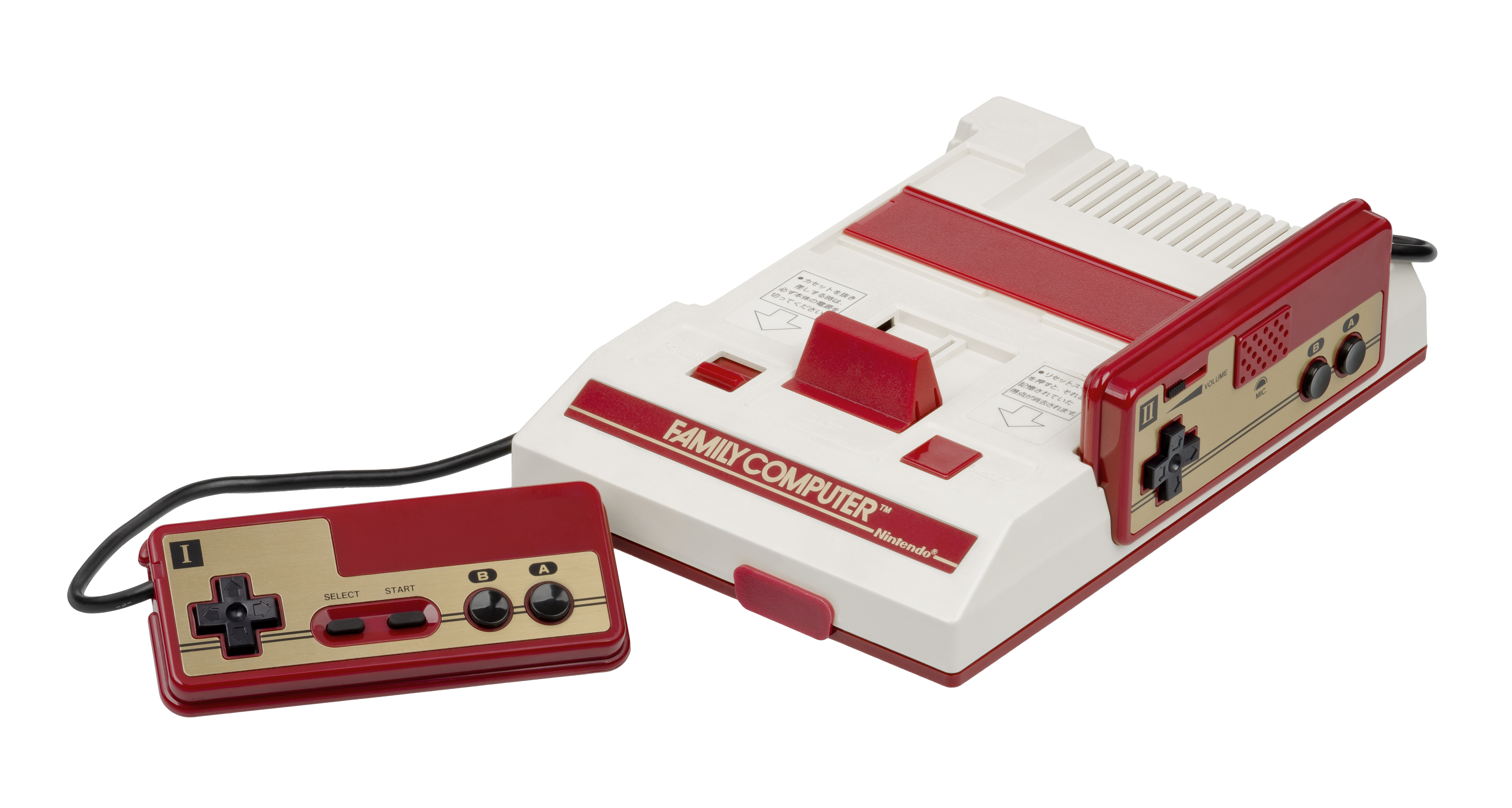
The Famicom

In April 1984, at age 23, Tezuka got a part-time job at Nintendo, working on the sprites of the arcade fighting game Super Punch-Out!! (1984) while he was still in university. The company hired him despite his unfamiliarity with gaming. He worked only for a few weeks. Afterwards, Tezuka graduated from the university. He also joined the company as a full-time employee, his first game credit being assistant director of Devil World (1984) for Nintendo's Famicom home console. His rapid ascent from new hire to assistant director was due to the company's limited staff at the time. New recruits would be "employed across different projects in different capacities as needed", meaning Tezuka also made games' instruction manuals, arcade cabinet art, sprite art, and Nintendo's playing cards.

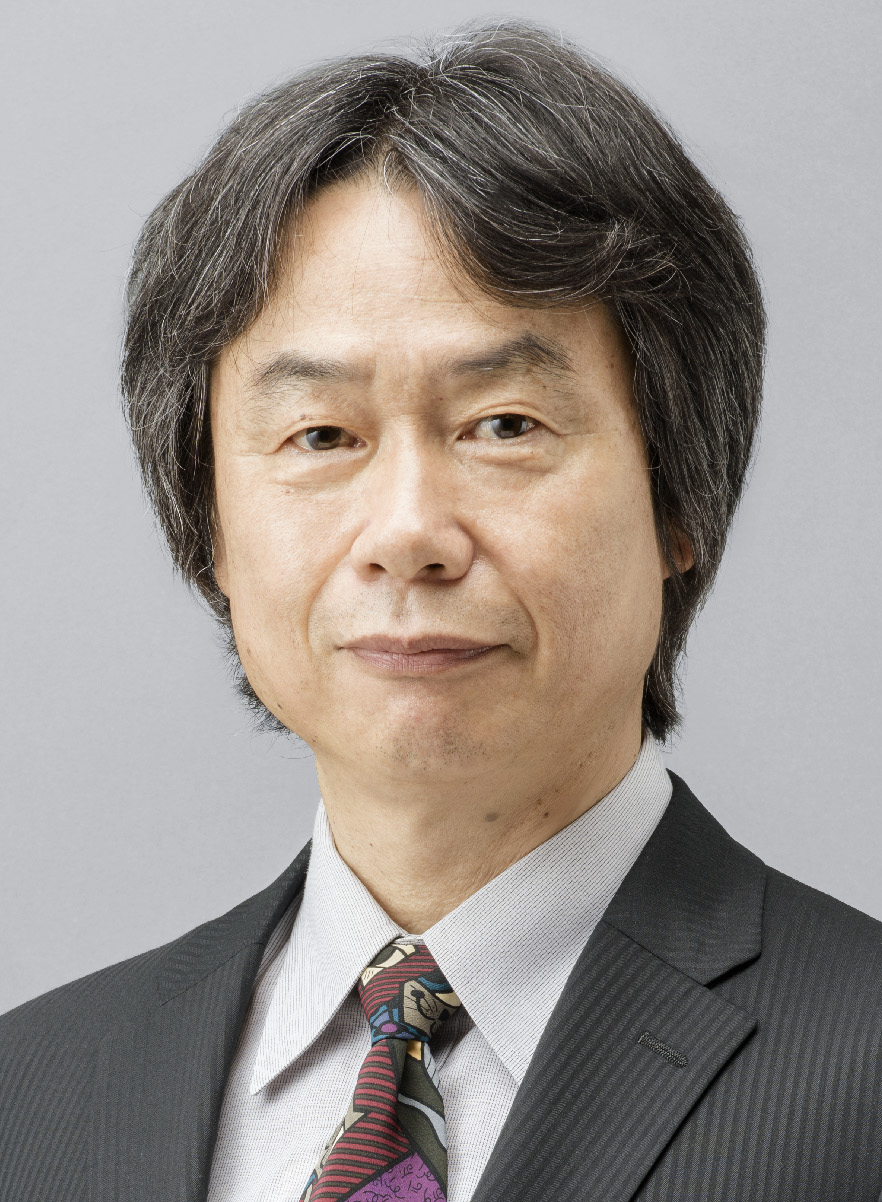
Shigeru Miyamoto, the lead designer of Devil World

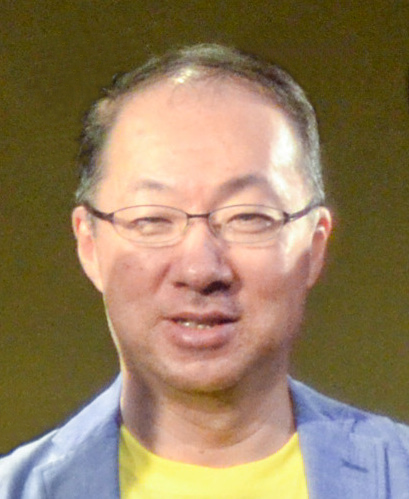
Koji Kondo, Devil World's composer

In Devil World, the player explores mazes while avoiding incarnations of the Devil; wherever the Devil looks, the mazes scroll across the screen in that direction, making it harder for the player to move through and exit them. Initially, it was designed solely by Shigeru Miyamoto, until partway through, when Tezuka started assisting him. Tezuka had much to learn about the Famicom's design at his job, as he did not own one before joining the company. He initially assumed it was a personal computer like its full name (Family Computer) suggested. Notably, Tezuka and Miyamoto utilized the advanced technology of the Famicom (compared to prior gaming platforms) to make the player character's sprite twice as big as most titles that came before. It was the first of numerous games the two have worked on together in the four decades since. Koji Kondo, who made his first musical score for a game with Devil World, has composed for many of those games.

=== Excitebike and VS. Excitebike (1984) ===
Tezuka helped "a little" on Miyamoto's design of Excitebike and VS. Excitebike, which both released in 1984. The former came out for the Famicom, while VS. Excitebike was part of the Nintendo VS. System, a series of multiplayer arcade ports of Famicom games—not to be confused with a 1988 Famicom game of the same name. In the two games, players race motorcycles on dirt tracks towards the right of the screen while jumping off of dirt formations and ramps. Their aim is to reach the finish line first, or get a high score. The titles were some of gaming's first side-scrollers, another feature that the Famicom allowed for.

=== Super Mario Bros. (1985) ===
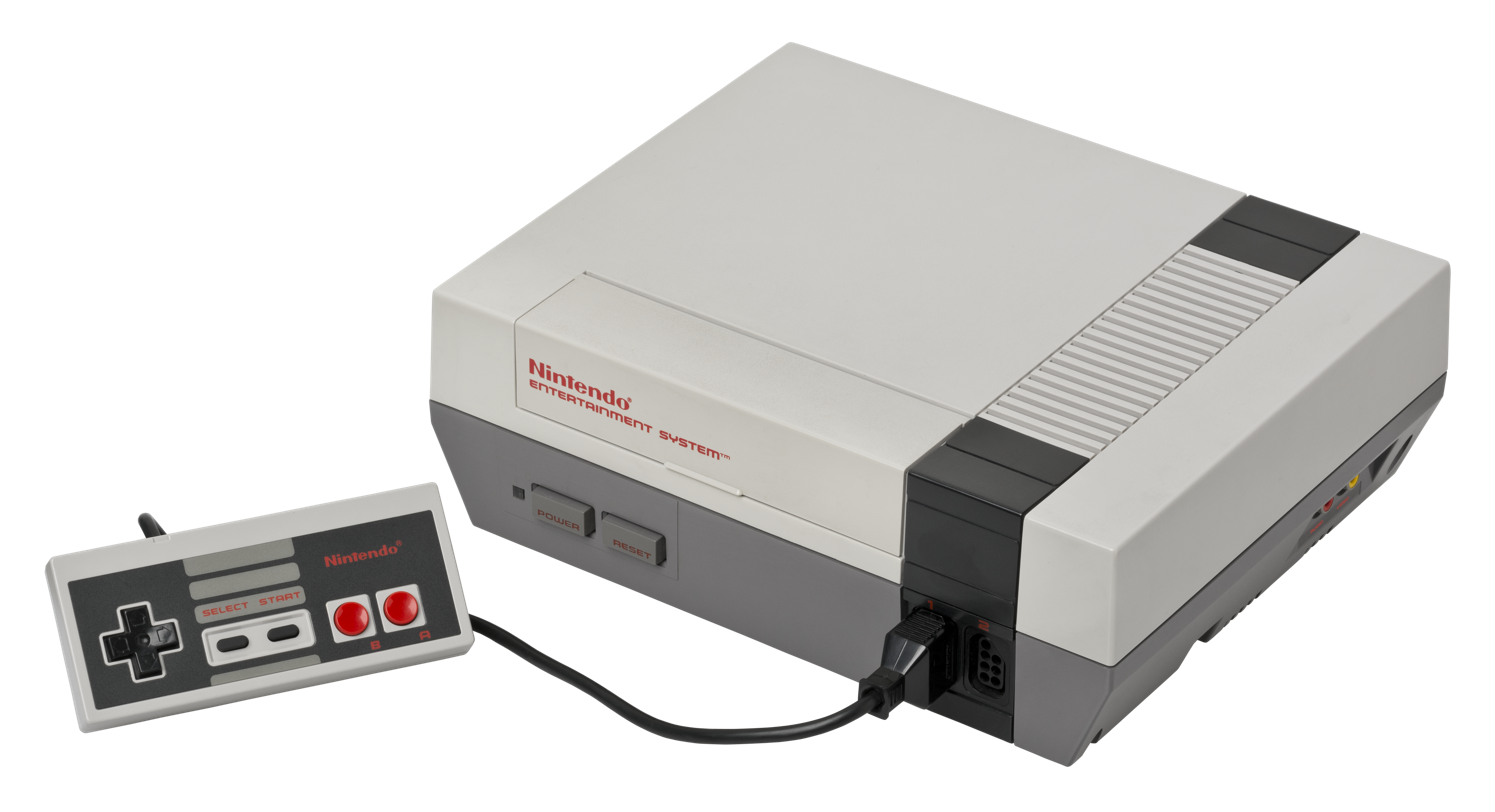
The Nintendo Entertainment System

A sequel to the arcade game Mario Bros. (1983), the 2D platformer Super Mario Bros.released in 1985 for the Famicom and the console's redesign released outside Japan, the Nintendo Entertainment System (NES). Tezuka served as the sequel's assistant director, working with Miyamoto, the director; Kondo, the composer; and programmers Kazuaki Morita and Toshihiko Nakago. Although Miyamoto already intended to use Mario as a mascot for many games following Mario Bros., it was Tezuka that first pitched a new game starring the character, after learning how consistently Mario Bros. was still selling on the Famicom a year after its release.

The group first developed Super Mario Bros. as a shoot 'em up, before they experimented with gameplay based around Mario jumping. From there, it became a 2D platformer, the shooting elements relegated to a bonus stage before being cut completely. Tezuka and Miyamoto used their recently acquired skills of making large sprites for Devil World and the scrolling camera of the Excitebike games, putting those elements into Mario. They two would sit next to each other, drawing designs on long sheets of paper. The group's final product is considered one of the most important video games ever released. Mark Langshaw writes for Digital Spy:

To put it simply, Nintendo hit the bullseye with Super Mario Bros. Gamers back in 1985 had never seen a platformer done so well. Not only was it more colourful and vibrant than most other games on the market, the controls were inch-perfect, and the gameplay instantly infectious.

Super Mario Bros. introduced the Super Mario series' staple power-ups—items like the Super Mushroom and Fire Flower, found in floating "Question Blocks", which give Mario helpful abilities—as well as the collectible coins; destructible, floating Brick Blocks; and enemies which Mario can stomp on, like Koopa Troopas. The characters Bowser and Princess Peach also made their first appearance. The player starts the game with Mario being represented by a small sprite, and they can collect the Super Mushroom to make Mario taller. This was first suggested by Toshihiko Nakago, and Tezuka and Miyamoto decided that players would have a greater understanding of the game's design if they started small and grew later, rather than starting big.

Super Mario Bros. sold more than 40 million copies, making it the seventh best-selling video game ever as of 2023, and the first game ever played by millions of people. It was released in the aftermath of the video game crash of 1983, a recession that greatly harmed the gaming industry's leaders in North America: Atari, Coleco, Magnavox, and Mattel. The medium's marketability in the region had been destroyed, which analysts believed could be permanent. Tezuka and Miyamoto's creation boosted sales of the NES, thus reviving gaming in the region, and making the game greatly responsible for Nintendo's current success. The resulting Super Mario series includes other titles considered to be "some of the most innovative and important platformers ever released". In 2021, TheGamer wrote that Tezuka "has worked on pretty much every Mario game since the franchise's inception".

=== Super Mario Bros: The Lost Levels (1986) ===
Tezuka and Miyamoto worked on a 1986 sequel to Super Mario Bros., which released for the Famicom as Super Mario Bros. 2. The game was Tezuka's directorial debut. His team "followed the template of the original [Super Mario Bros.] very precisely, while increasing the challenge for veterans". The game's levels contain not only Super Mushrooms, but visually similar versions of them which are actually deadly for Mario to touch—as well as trampolines which send him high above the screen, making it hard for the player to know where they'll land. It was not ported to the NES, as Nintendo predicted Western gamers would find it "too difficult, too weird, or maybe too Japanese" compared to the first game. The NES received its own "Super Mario Bros. 2": a reskin of an unrelated Famicom game, Yume Kojo: Doki Doki Panic. The Japanese Super Mario Bros. 2 came to the West in 1993 as Super Mario Bros.: The Lost Levels, part of the Super Mario All-Stars compilation for the Super Nintendo Entertainment System (SNES) console.

=== The Legend of Zelda (1986) and Zelda II: The Adventure of Link (1987) ===
Tezuka and Miyamoto developed The Legend of Zelda (1986), an action-adventure game for the Famicom and NES. Miyamoto designed its gameplay, while both worked on its story. The game began the Legend of Zelda series, and established its universe, which has been fleshed out with each subsequent entry, and a 2011 book. Tezuka's worldbuilding for the first game was influenced by high fantasy novels such as J. R. R. Tolkien's The Lord of the Rings. Tezuka also wrote for the sequel Zelda II: The Adventure of Link (1987).

The Triforce

The Zelda universe is a high fantasy setting, and most of its games take place in the kingdom of Hyrule. In the first game, the player character Link must save the Hylian princess, Zelda, from the villain Ganon. Ganon has stolen the Triforce of Power, an artifact granting mortals magical powers, and split the similar Triforce of Wisdom into eight pieces, hiding them around the game world. The player must collect and then combine the pieces to utilize the Triforce of Wisdom and defeat Ganon. Zelda II introduced the Triforce of Courage, spiritually aligned with Power and Wisdom to make the singular Triforce.

=== Super Mario Bros. 3 (1988) ===
Working with Miyamoto, Tezuka was a designer and the director of the NES sequel Super Mario Bros. 3 (1988). The game had a very long development cycle for an 8-bit game, at two and a half years. The number of people Tezuka worked with had grown to around 20 or 30. From the start of development, he wanted Mario to have a tail the player could use to spin him around and knock out enemies—as well as for Mario to fly. This led to the Tanooki Suit, an outfit themed after the tanuki animal, which lets him do both. Variations of the suit later appeared in many Super Mario games. The player can also obtain the Frog Suit, which makes Mario slower on land, but agile in water; and Kuribo's Shoe, a giant shoe he sits inside of to jump onto enemies and safely land on obstacles.

Another staple of the franchise that debuted are the Boo species of ghosts. In Mario platformers, they fly towards him, and damage him if he touches them. They also freeze in fear when Mario looks at them, but fly towards him otherwise. They were designed by Tezuka, who was inspired by a reaction he once had to his wife. He says his wife is "very quiet normally", but one day, she "exploded" in anger at him regarding all the time he spent at his job; his rapidly frightened reaction led to the Boos' behavior.

The designers eschewed The Lost Levels' difficulty, with Tezuka later saying "we couldn't do that again". He thus decided he had to differentiate Super Mario Bros. 3 from its predecessors by overhauling the series' visual design. The team initially tried to give the camera seen in the game's levels an angled, slightly overhead view of the gameplay. This made it hard to tell when Mario's feet hit the ground after a jump, so they changed back to the traditional side-view camera—the transition being led by Miyamoto. There are still aspects of the original camera in the final game, such as with the levels' checkered floors.

For Super Mario Bros. 3, Tezuka outlined the game's sprites, made its checkered floors angular, created Mario's "Tanooki Suit", and separated the eyes and hat of Mario's sprite.

Unlike previous Mario games, black outlines were added to all Super Mario Bros. 3's sprites, and a clear separation was made Mario's hat and eyes on his sprite. His eyes were moved up closer to his hat to make him look cuter. Super Mario Bros. 3 was the last time that Tezuka drew the sprites for a Mario game, later saying that as Nintendo began working with the SNES' advanced 16-bit graphics, "there were just a lot of people that were better than me".

=== Super Mario World (1990) ===
As Miyamoto moved up in Nintendo around this time, Tezuka replaced him as the director of many games. Tezuka directed the SNES platformer Super Mario World, which released in 1990. Development of the game was relatively short, starting around 1988. Unlike with Super Mario Bros. 3, Tezuka did not serve as visual designer, feeling had he worked on too many roles for the previous game. The role went to Shigefumi Hino. Super Mario World's developers wanted the game, a launch title for the SNES, to demonstrate how the console's advanced hardware could lead to more complex types of gameplay than were possible on the NES. Tezuka thus came up with the idea of Mario being able to ride the dinosaur Yoshi.

A sprite sheet used during development of Super Mario World, which includes Yoshi's original design that Tezuka redrew

While making Super Mario Bros. 3, Miyamoto drew a picture of Mario riding a horse, and put it up on a wall near his workspace at Nintendo. Tezuka assumed he wanted Mario to be able "to ride something" in a game. When Super Mario World's developers came up with its setting of a land populated by dinosaurs, Tezuka asked Hino to design one for Mario to ride, inspired by Miyamoto's drawing. Hino's first designs of Yoshi showed a realistic reptile-looking creature, described by writer Alex Wayro as being "like a sad turtle". Feeling it looked out of place in Mario's world, Tezuka sketched a cuter version of the character, and gave him a shell that Mario uses as saddle. Hino then touched up Tezuka's design, making the version of Yoshi seen in the final game. Yoshi became one of Nintendo's "core" characters, appearing in future Mario games and starring in his own titular series.

=== The Legend of Zelda: A Link to the Past (1991) ===
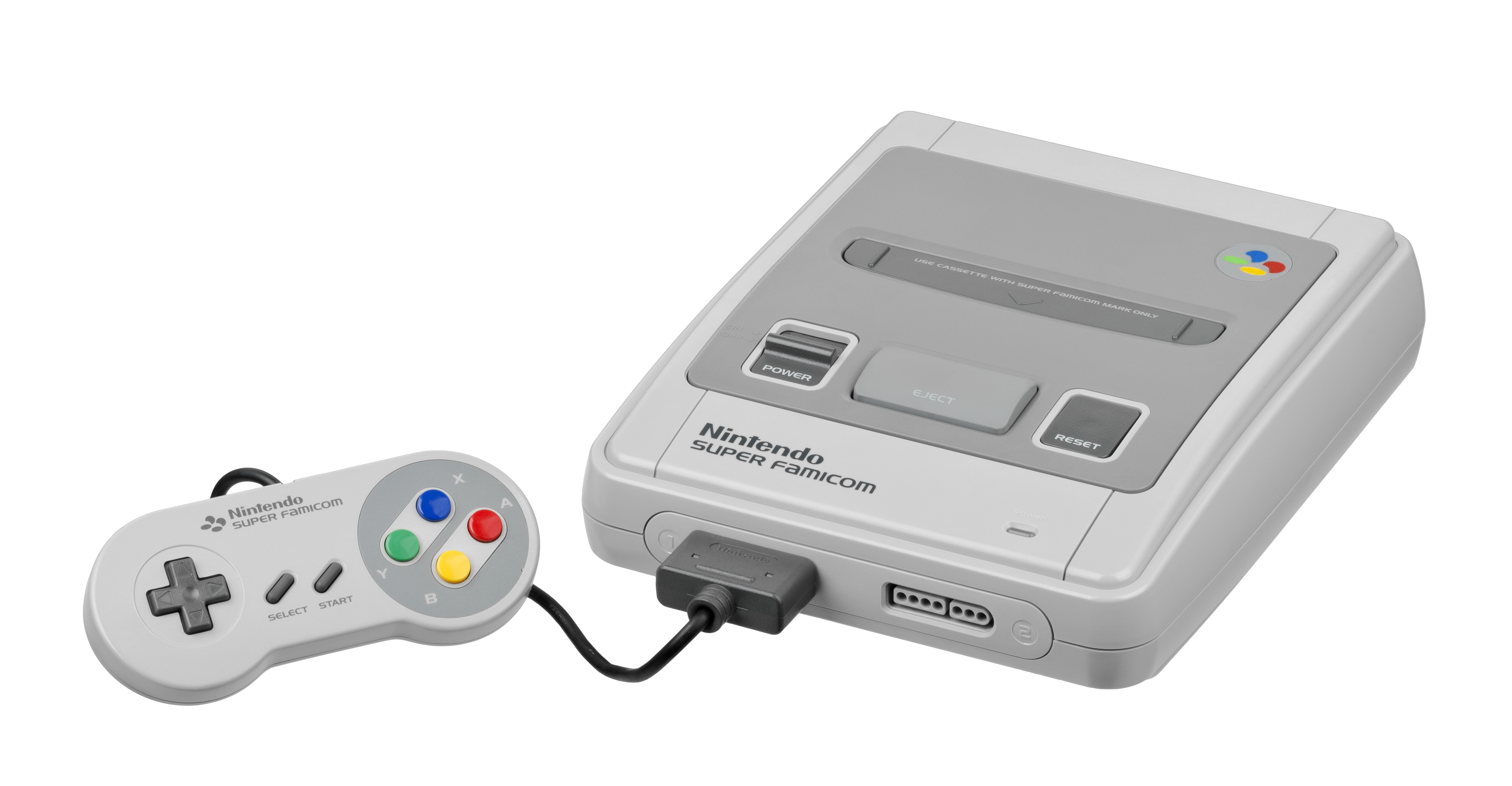
The Super Famicom, released outside Japan as the Super Nintendo Entertainment System (SNES)

Tezuka directed The Legend of Zelda: A Link to the Past (1991) for the SNES. The sequel retained the top-down perspective of The Legend of Zelda and Zelda II, but introduced "overlapping worlds" to the series: the game is split between the Light World and Dark World, two parallel universes that are variations of a singular game map, which Link must teleport between during his quest. Similarly, Tezuka's team used the SNES' ability to have multiple overlapping layers of graphics in the game; most of the sprites exist on the general layer for the world, a layer of special effects is overlaid on that, and the top layer is the game's HUD. The special effects layer allowed them to add weather effects like rays of sunshine or rain to the environments.

The core controls of Zelda were smoothed, as Link became able to walk in four more directions—between the prior cardinal directions—and swing his sword in an arc, rather than sticking it out towards a single direction. The player can hold the attack button to charge up a Spin Attack, in which he quickly moves it in a circle around his body. Link cannot attack while charging up, adding complexity to combat by making players decide if a charge is worth it in their situation. A debuting item is the Hookshot, a grappling hook that Link can shoot out of his hand and attach to certain surfaces he normally could not reach, sending him flying over to the target location.

A Link to the Past's story was more dramatic than prior Zelda games. Before core gameplay can start, the player has to complete a cinematic opening sequence involving breaking into Hyrule Castle on a rainy night, without Link's usual weapons. At key points in the story, he unlocks items that help him in his quest; during one such moment, he unlocks the Master Sword, which magically repels evil, and this brings begins the climax of the plot. The scene was formulated by the game's writer Kensuke Tanabe, and Tezuka's team decided it would be a great way to show players that "it's at this point that the game's real battle starts". A Link to the Past became immediately regarded as a masterpiece by players and critics, and for twenty years afterwards, Zelda games were built using its general structure.

=== The Legend of Zelda: Link's Awakening (1993) ===
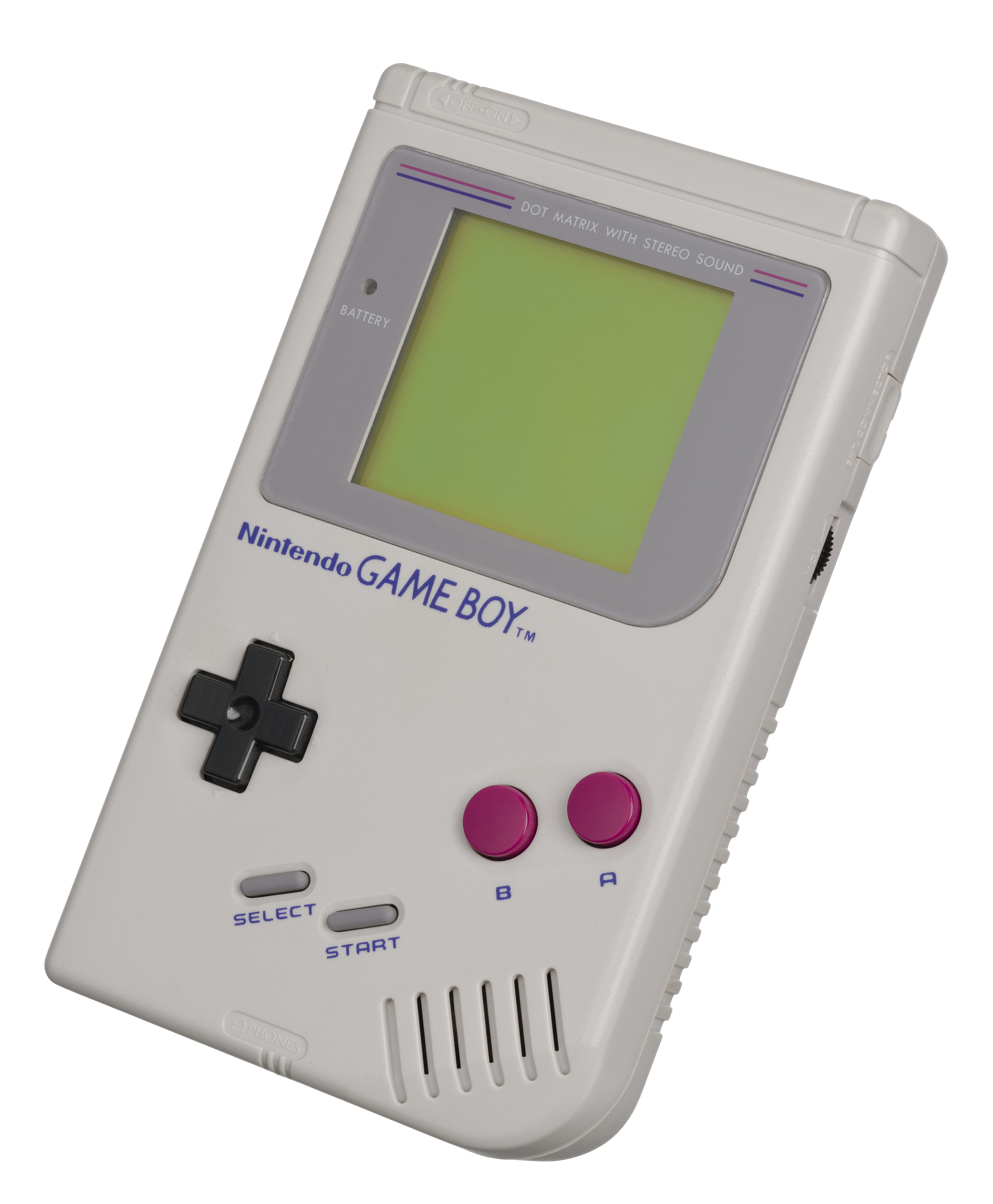
The original Game Boy

Some time in the early 1990s, Tezuka and some other developers at Nintendo challenged themselves to make a Zelda game with the general structure of the NES and SNES games, but on Nintendo's small Game Boy handheld console. Initially, they were just "playing around", without necessarily having permission from Nintendo's higher-ups to make it. Once the game reached "a certain level of creation and completion that we wanted to show", the team took it to the higher-ups, who greenlit it. The project became The Legend of Zelda: Link's Awakening (1993), which Tezuka directed. He later said that the game's "interesting characters and situations" which differed from Zelda and Zelda II might not have been created if the project wasn't a casual experiment at the start.

Inspired by the American surrealist mystery TV series Twin Peaks (1990–1991)—which first broadcast in Japan at the start of development—Tezuka gave the game a surrealist story, creating a community of suspicious NPCs to replicate the residents of the show's titular town setting. Link's Awakening takes place inside Link's dream after going unconscious following a shipwreck; in it, he washes up on the shore of the strange island of Koholint Island. Despite the perceived advancements in Zelda's storytelling in A Link to the Past, Tezuka later stated that Link's Awakening is where the series started significantly focusing on its stories.

=== Super Mario All-Stars (1993) ===
After the Zelda sequels, Tezuka directed the SNES title Super Mario All-Stars (1993). It is a compilation of four Mario games—Super Mario Bros.; the Japanese Super Mario Bros. 2, renamed Super Mario Bros.: The Lost Levels in All-Stars' English release; the Western Super Mario Bros. 2; and Super Mario Bros. 3—with updated 16-bit graphics and audio.

=== Yoshi's Island (1995) ===
Tezuka's last directorial role on a game was for the SNES platformer Yoshi's Island (1995). He worked with a team that included Shigefumi Hino, who later directed Pikmin (2001), and Hideki Konno, who would produce various Mario Kart titles and, in the 2010s, head Nintendo's mobile gaming department. The game was a sequel to Super Mario World, but changed many of its elements to create something very different from previous Mario games. In Yoshi's Island, the titular character has to carry a recently-born Mario on his back while finding Luigi, who has been kidnapped. Yoshi can stick his tongue out at enemies, swallow them, and lay an egg containing them, which he can then throw at objects and other enemies. Aiming the egg throws in a particular direction is key to solving many puzzles in the levels. When Yoshi gets hit, Mario flies off his back, and the player has to retrieve him by the time a countdown on the screen reaches zero, or else receive a game over. To match the story, the game's world was made to look like it was drawn by crayons. Artist Hisashi Nogami drew the sprites by hand in real life, then scanned them into a computer, and redrew the pictures pixel-by-pixel into the game.

=== Super Mario 64 (1996) ===
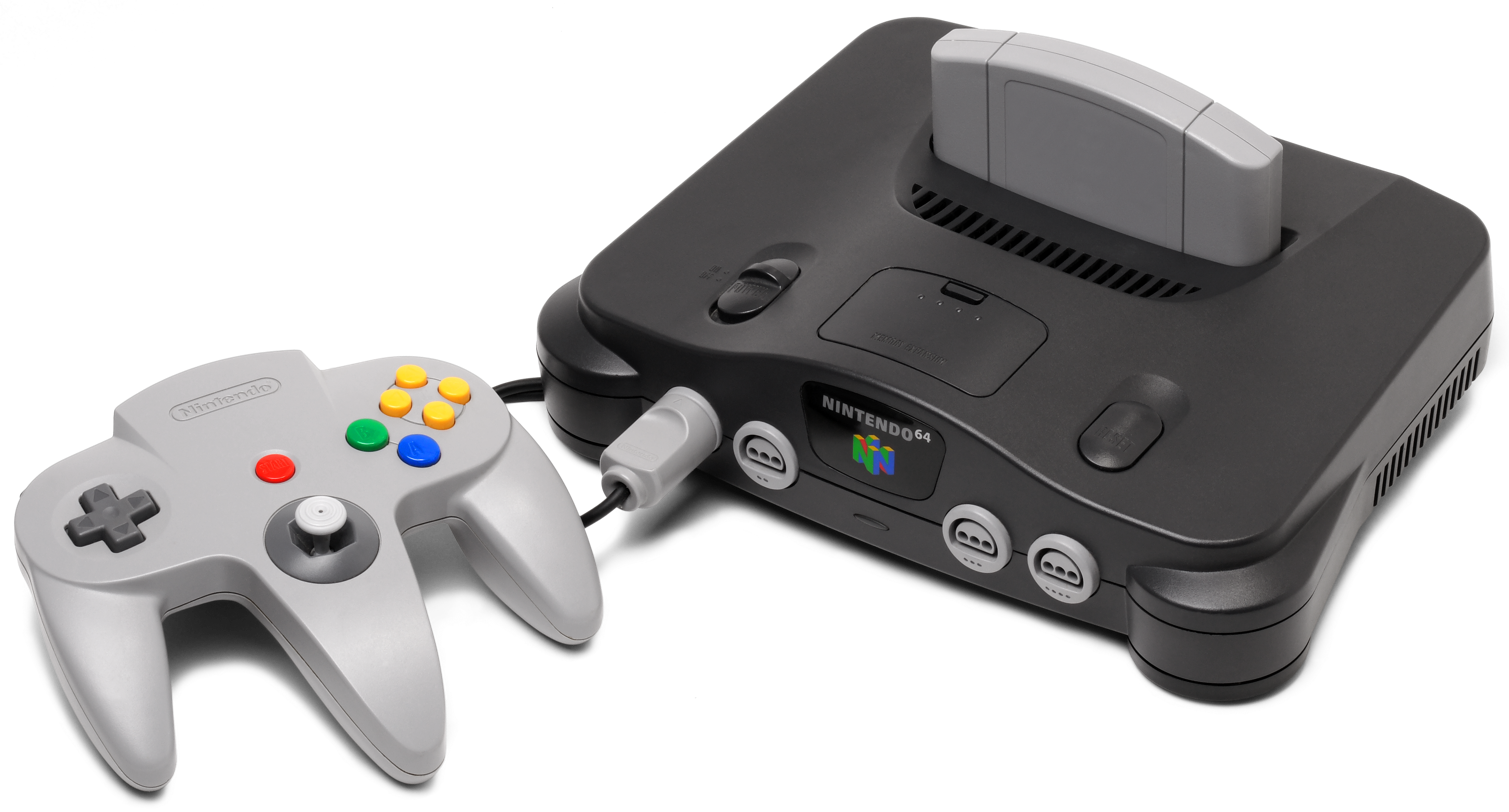
The Nintendo 64

Tezuka was an assistant director of Super Mario 64 (1996), a launch title for the Nintendo 64 home console. It was his last credit as a game designer, as he worked with a "dream team" that included Miyamoto. The Nintendo 64 was the company's first console to support fully-3D computer graphics, making Super Mario 64 one of the first-ever fully-3D platformers. Miyamoto felt that before the team started on level design, he personally needed to perfect Mario's controls in 3D space, which had a complexity never before seen in games. This contributed to a long development. Super Mario's controls had historically adhered to properties of real-life physics: mass, momentum, and inertia—paired with an unrealistic ability to move in mid-air—which the player has to consider before moving and jumping. Before Super Mario 64, 3D platformers did not include all of these properties, making them to difficult to play. Rich Stanton later wrote for Eurogamer that it was "the first 3D game that actually felt as good to play as a 2D game"; it therefore created the rules of 3D platforming movement that most games in the genre adhered to afterwards.

Mario uses the hub world of Princess Peach's castle to enter different levels; the player has to jump into the castle's many magical paintings that depict the levels to be teleported to them. This makes navigation in Super Mario 64 a more playful act than selecting levels from a menu, as in other games. The castle is also filled with numerous secrets to discover. Inside the levels, the player uses Mario's new controls to traverse complex 3D spaces: climbing and sliding down hills, pounding wooden posts into grass, and jumping over lava to reach platforms. He can grab certain objects and characters, and if he steps on a Koopa Troopa, he can use its shell like a surfboard, sliding around the level.

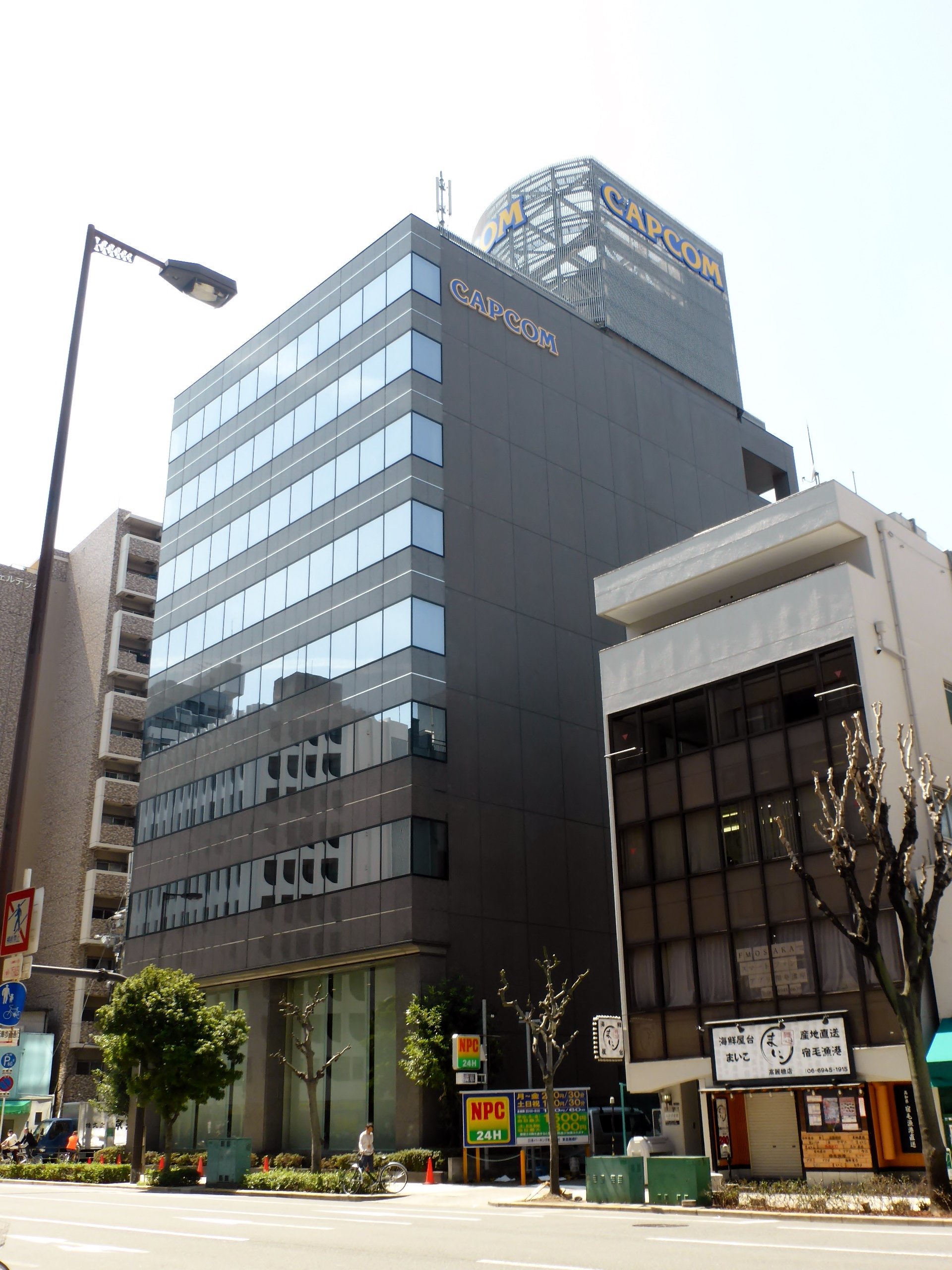
Tezuka oversaw Capcom's development of The Legend of Zelda: Oracle of Seasons and Oracle of Ages.

=== Switch to managerial roles (1990s) ===
Upon completing Super Mario 64, Tezuka stopped being a hands-on game designer. He was promoted to Nintendo's upper management after the Nintendo 64's launch, and started working on game projects as a producer or supervisor. Nintendo Life writer Gavin Lane later summarized Tezuka's career from 1984 until then: "In a single decade, Tezuka went from being unable to point out Pac-Man in a lineup to shifting our understanding of what video games could be. It's a truly remarkable turnaround."

Since then, Tezuka has generally kept a low profile, while preparing Nintendo's younger and lower-level employees for more commanding roles later on in their careers. He has also overseen external companies' development of games featuring Nintendo's intellectual properties, like at Capcom on 2001's The Legend of Zelda: Oracle of Seasons and Oracle of Ages for the Game Boy—and worked as an engineer assisting TV crews at Nintendo's SpaceWorld 1995 trade show.

=== Yoshi's Story (1997) ===
One of Tezuka's first credits after being promoted was for Yoshi's Story (1997) for the Nintendo 64. The game is a sequel to Yoshi's Island, which retains the original's side-scrolling camera. While hunting after a toddler version of Bowser, the player can switch between numerous multicolored dinosaurs in the Yoshi species to use as their avatar. The game is much easier than Yoshi's Island; Yoshi does not carry Mario on his back, leaving the player to focus on their own health. At various points in the levels, the player can choose one of multiple branching paths to continue onto, which encourages replayability. Yoshi's Story's world features assets that look like they were made out of paper, as thematically, the levels are supposed to be living representations of the pages of a storybook.

=== Animal Crossing (2001) ===
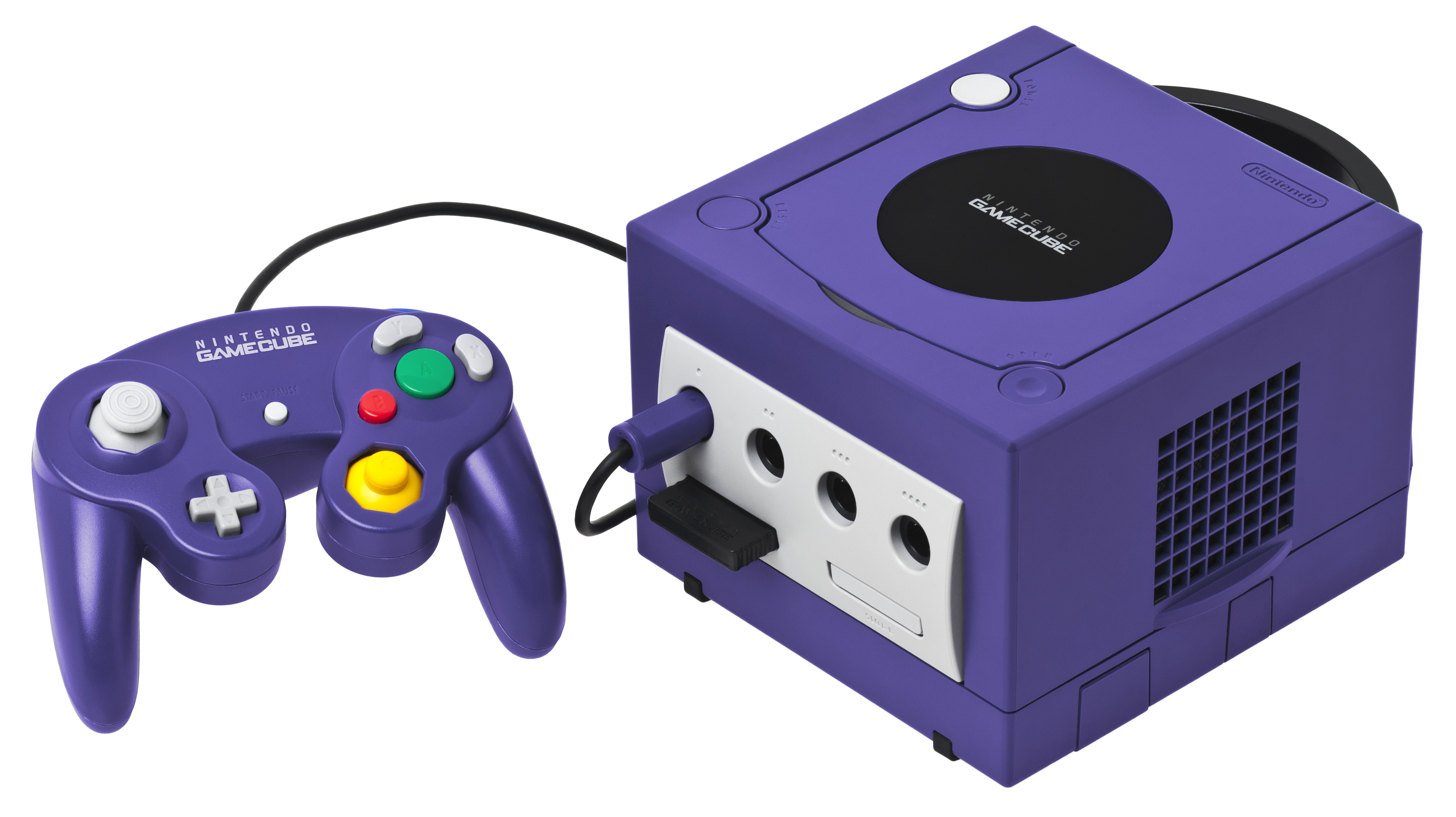
The GameCube

Tezuka produced the social simulation game Animal Crossing (2001), which released in Japan for the Nintendo 64 and GameCube, and in other regions only for the GameCube. In it, the player controls the only human resident of a town of animals, and can interact with them in various ways. The game has a virtual economy, and players earn money by completing villagers' tasks, or selling items to Tom Nook, a local raccoon businessman. The player starts the game in a small, "crummy" house bought with loans from Nook. To get out of debt and improve their house, the player must sell him items, as they cannot pay him upfront. Animal Crossing's world updates in sync with the internal calendar on whatever device the game is running on; for example, the village will celebrate a holiday named "Bunny Day" if the calendar date corresponds with Easter.

Katsuya Eguchi designed Animal Crossing as a way to replicate the social experience of living in a small town, as he felt lonely after moving from such a place in Chiba Prefecture to Kyoto, Nintendo's home city. Tezuka worked on the game from its early stages, when it was named Animal Forest, and after it was renamed. It began development as a role-playing game. From there, Tezuka said, "we kind of made the theme of the game communicating directly with other characters and communicating directly with other players in your town"; communicating with other villagers is a requirement for the player to collect certain items, like clothing for their character and furniture for their house. In general, Animal Crossing was designed so the player could build "your own personal world" where "you're free to do what you want to do".

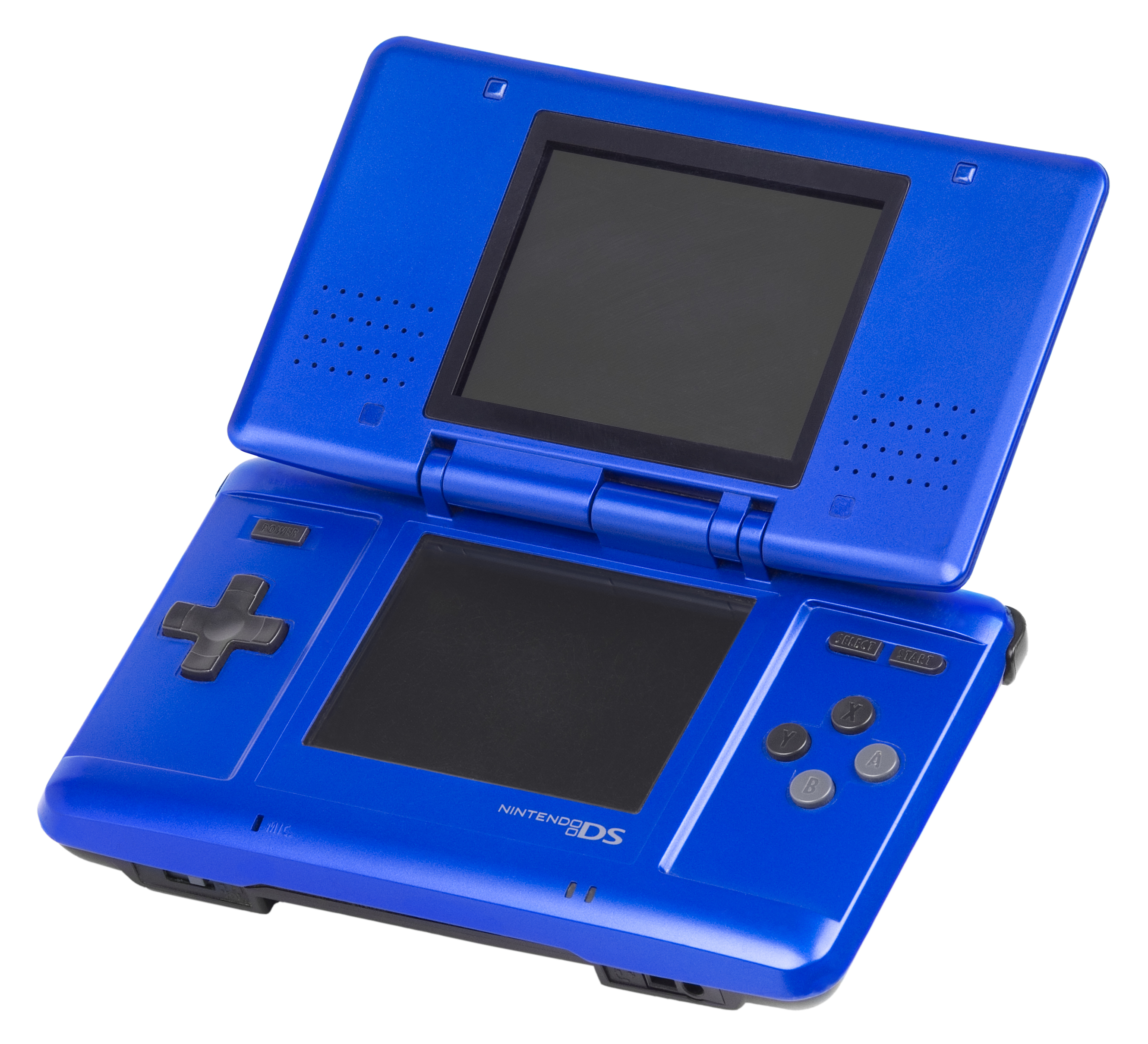
The original Nintendo DS

=== GameCube, GBA, DS, and Wii roles ===
After Animal Crossing, Tezuka worked as a producer or supervisor of the GameCube titles Pikmin (2001), Luigi's Mansion (2001), The Legend of Zelda: The Wind Waker (2002), Mario Kart: Double Dash (2003), and Pikmin 2 (2004). He also had some role on the Nintendo DS games Yoshi Touch & Go (2005) and Yoshi's Island DS (2006), as well as for the Mario Advance and New Super Mario Bros. series.

=== Flipnote Studio (2009) ===
Tezuka also produced Flipnote Studio (2009), software released for the Nintendo DSi that, before the service shut down, let users draw on the device's touchscreen display, creating short animations which could be uploaded online for others to view.

=== Yoshi's New Island (2014) ===
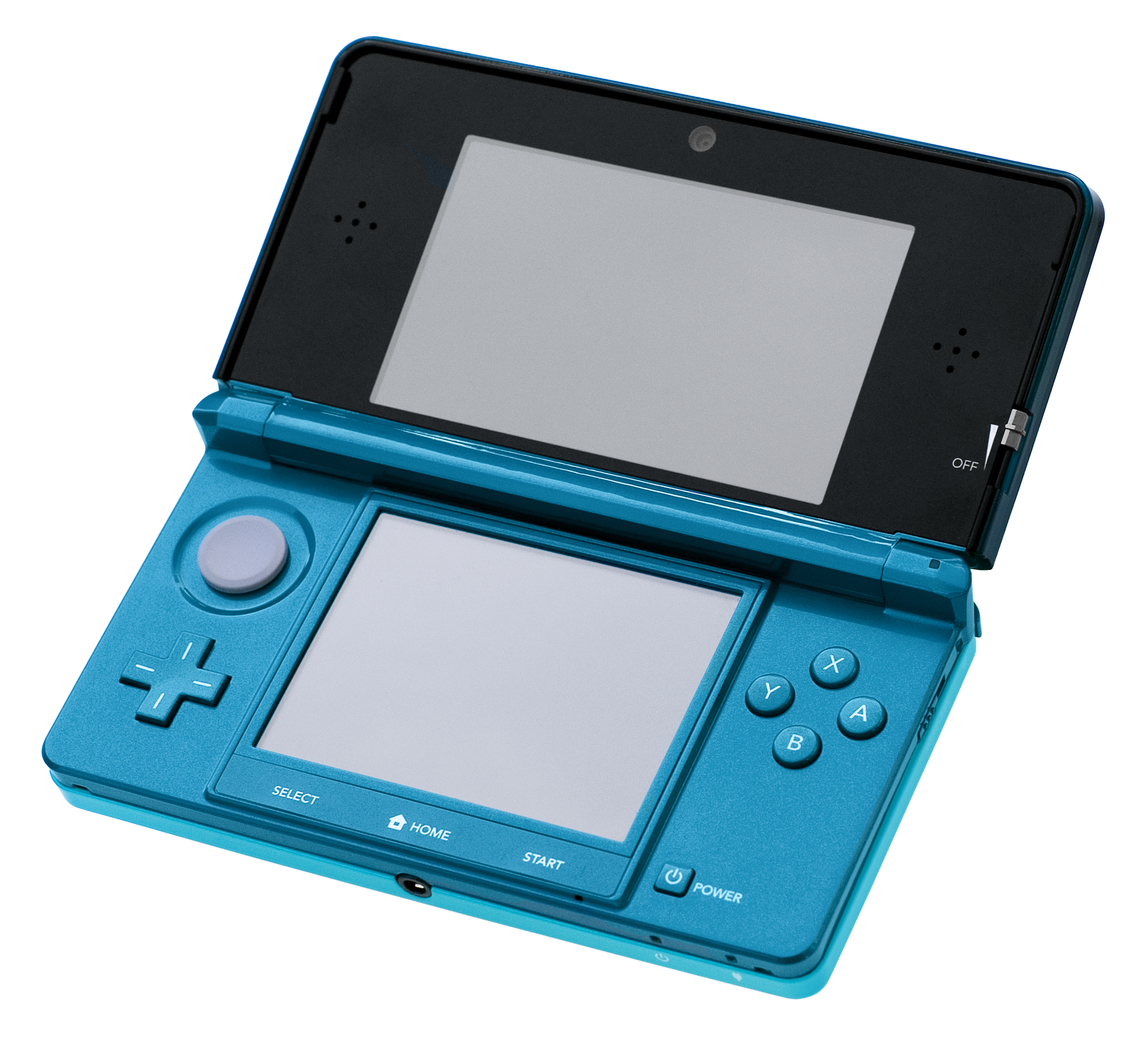
The original Nintendo 3DS

Tezuka produced Yoshi's New Island (2014) for the Nintendo 3DS handheld console. The development team included other members of the Yoshi's Island team. The game's mechanics and typical level structure are generally borrowed from the SNES game; however, as with Yoshi's Story the levels were made easier to complete. To make up for this, for players who wanted Yoshi's Island's difficulty, the team made it hard to obtain 100% of its collectible items such as stars or flowers. Yoshi's New Island introduced giant Yoshi eggs named Mega Eggdozers, which players need to collect to complete a level—as well as several items which make Yoshi transform and gain abilities, like being able to swim underwater for a long time, run very fast, or turn into a hot air balloon or submarine.

Similar to Yoshi's Island, the world of Yoshi's New Island looks like it has been made with crayons, oil paint, and watercolor paint. The game also makes use of the handheld's stereoscopic 3D display, showing the player physical depth in the game world when the 3D mode is active; the developers spent a significant amount of time making sure no visual bugs would result from this. Utilizing the 3DS' internal gyroscopic sensor, and while Yoshi uses binoculars, players can tilt the handheld left or right to reveal the areas of a level just outside the screen.

=== Super Mario Maker (2015) ===
Tezuka worked on the 2015 Wii U game Super Mario Maker, which allows players to make their own 2D platformer Super Mario levels. Until the Wii U's Nintendo Network online gaming service shut down in 2024, the game also let them play levels that other owners of the game created and uploaded online. Tezuka's team started development wanting to utilize the Wii U GamePad's touchscreen display, and started on a sequel to Mario Paint (1992) that let players digitally paint with the guidance of the touch user interface. They eventually switched to making a simplified version of Nintendo's internal level creation software used on previous Super Mario games.

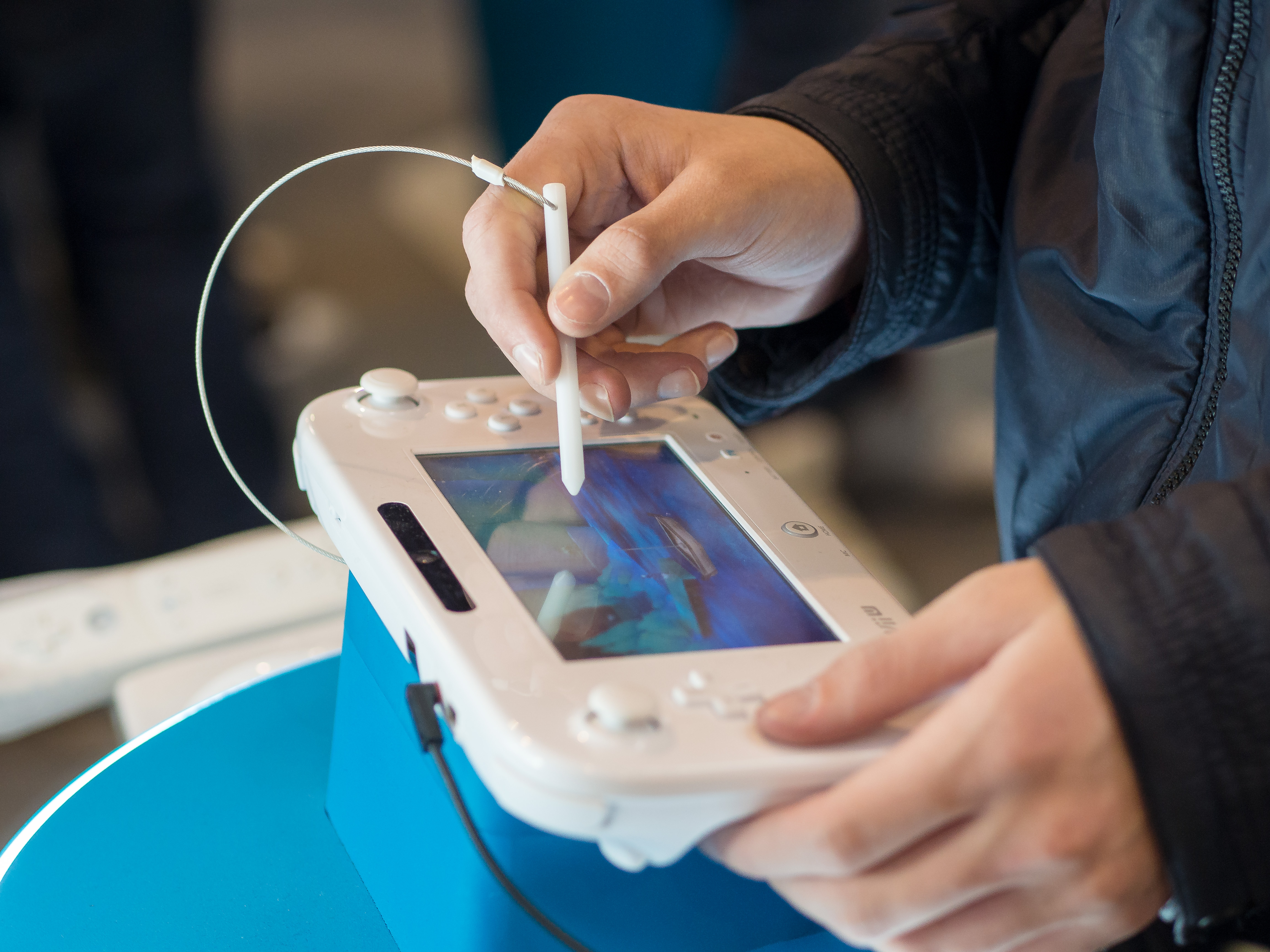
Tezuka and his team began developing Super Mario Maker in search of a utility for the Wii U GamePad's touchscreen.

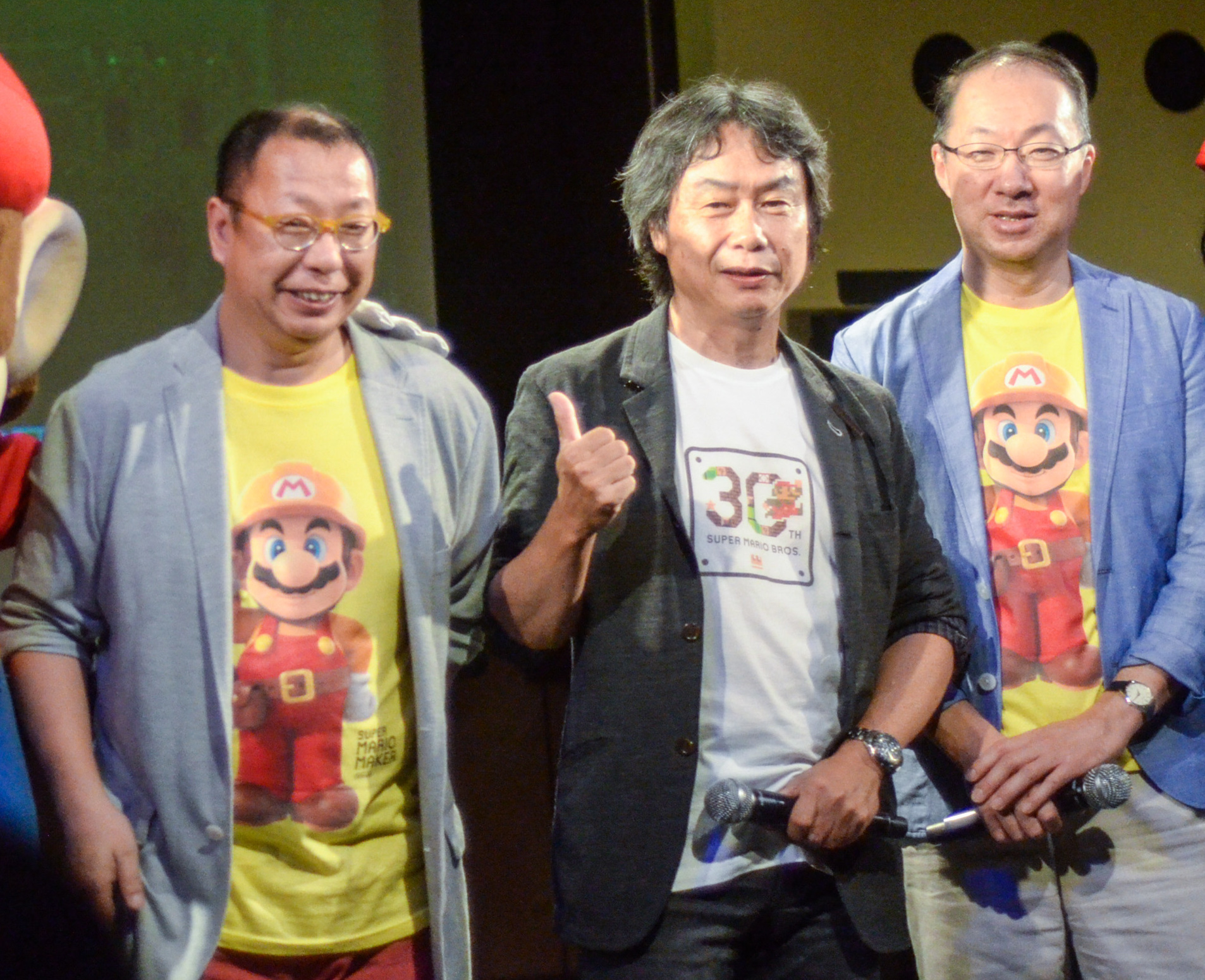
Left to right: Tezuka, Miyamoto, and Kondo in 2015, promoting Mario Maker

Nintendo World Report writes that Tezuka's fame among Nintendo fans increased in 2015, due to his publicized roles in creating Mario Maker and Yoshi's Woolly World (2015). Before then, "Miyamoto could barely walk two feet at E3 without getting mobbed", while Tezuka was "regularly spotted walking around the show floor with little to no fanfare."

=== Super Mario Run (2016) ===
Tezuka was a developer of Super Mario Run, a 2D platformer released for mobile devices like the iPhone in 2016. Most of the original team behind the 1985 Mario game worked on this entry, including Miyamoto, who was producer. Mario Run sacrificed much of Mario's traditional moveset in Super Mario games—designed for controllers— to work smoothly on a touch user interface. The character automatically runs to the right in the game's levels, instead of the player controlling his speed and direction. To deter Mario from hitting obstacles, the player taps on the device's screen to make him jump—the longer they tap, the higher he jumps. Tapping can also decrease the speed of his fall in mid-air.

=== 2018 promotion ===
By 2018, Tezuka had been working for some time as senior officer of Nintendo's Entertainment Planning & Development (EPD) division. That year, the company announced he had been promoted to executive officer of Nintendo's board of directors, but that he would maintain his role at Nintendo EPD.

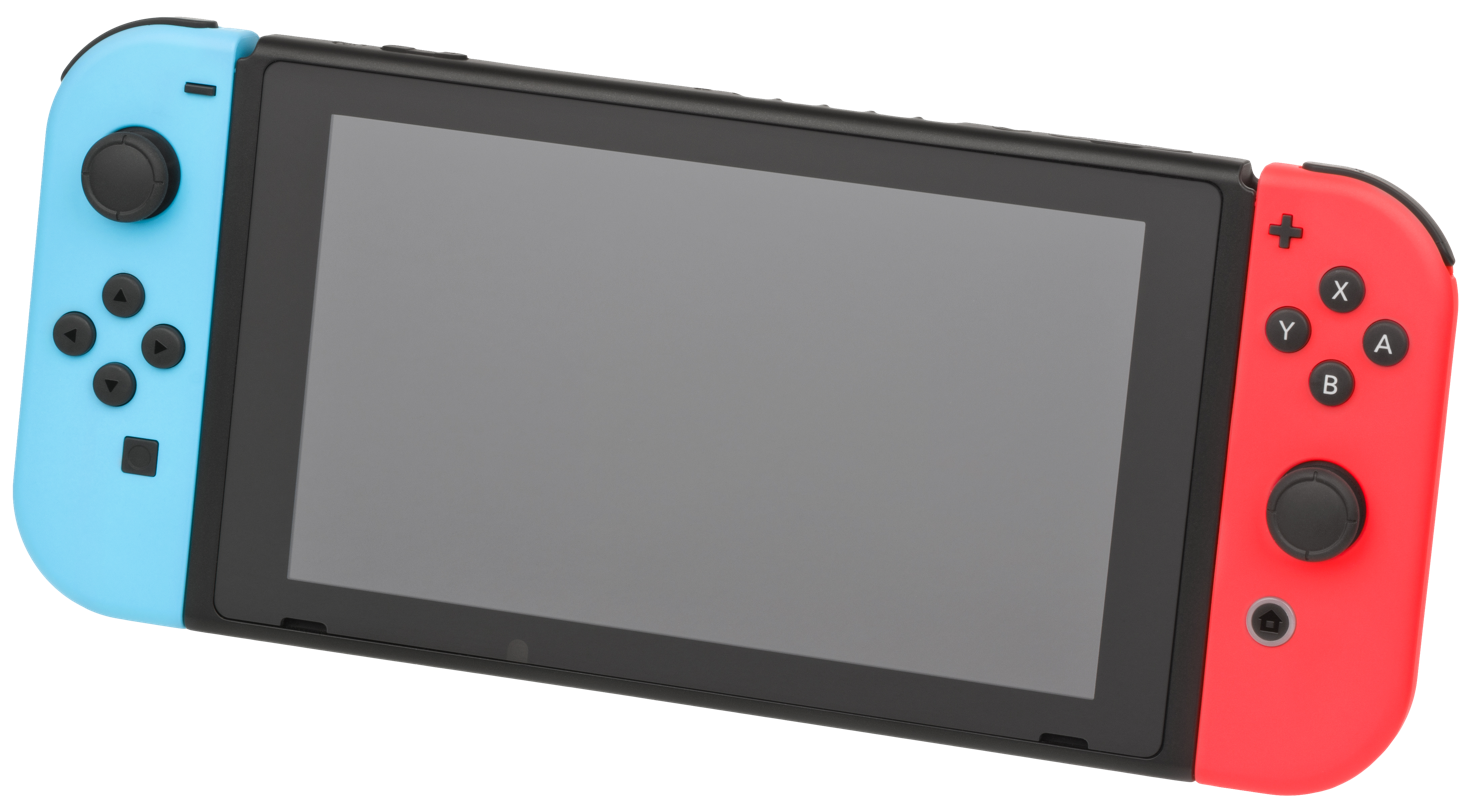
The original Nintendo Switch in portable mode

=== Super Mario Maker 2 (2019) ===
Tezuka produced Super Mario Maker 2, which released for the Nintendo Switch in 2019. Compared to the Wii U Mario Maker, the sequel has an increased amount of mechanics that players can implement into their levels. It also introduced a story mode, and online multiplayer for any levels that users had uploaded.

In 2024, Tezuka said he felt some of the levels uploaded online on the Mario Maker games "were not very good", and that that helped him answer a question he discussed with Miyamoto prior to the game's release: if it was easier to make a good 2D platformer than a 3D one—the answer being no. He described the games as a "crowdsourced experiment" that taught him "even if design elements like controls and enemies are solid, 'whether they come alive or fall flat are dependent on the level designer'".

=== Super Mario Bros. Wonder (2023) ===
Tezuka was the producer of the 2D platformer Super Mario Bros. Wonder, released for the Nintendo Switch in 2023. Shiro Mouri served as director, and Miyamoto as supervisor. Controlling Mario in the game, the player can touch certain flowers named "Wonder Flowers" to activate "Wonder Effects", which change Mario's design, or the layout, aesthetics, and mechanics of a level. Reviewers described the level change effects as "psychedelic". The player can also equip a select number of badges before entering a level, which give Mario permanent abilities, such as making him run automatically at all times.

Wonder Effects were created as an attempt to replicate the developers' experiences of being surprised by the secrets they found within video games as children. As Super Mario Bros. Wonder was designed to be accessible to all ages—and thus, varying skill levels—the badge system was as a way to make the game's difficulty customizable by the player. The game's main designers solicited ideas for Wonder Effects and badges from the entire development team, and in total, they received two thousand different submissions. Mouri first brought up the idea of Wonder Effects, telling Tezuka that the Wonder Flowers could transport Mario to a different location; Tezuka suggested that the world should change around Mario instead. Tezuka also created the voice-acted talking flowers that appear in some levels and tell Mario various things, including hints on what the level will contain.

=== Pikmin 4 (2023) ===
Tezuka was the producer of the real-time strategy game Pikmin 4 (2023) for the Switch. Nintendo first announced the game in 2015, saying it was near completion, yet development continued for eight years afterwards.

=== Yoshi and the Mysterious Book (2026) ===
Tezuka was producer on the title just like the previous Yoshi titles.

=== Leaving the board of directors ===
On May 8, 2026, Nintendo announced as part of their financial results that Tezuka would be retiring from the company's board of directors on June 26, 2026 as an executive officer after being part of the board for 8 years. Tezuka would still remain in the company and continue working as a developer in Nintendo EPD as a senior officer in the division but without executive responsibilities in the board.

== Ludography ==
| Year | Title | Role |
|---|---|---|
| 1984 | Super Punch-Out!! | Graphic artist |
| 1984 | Devil World | Assistant director, graphic artist |
| 1984 | Excitebike | Graphic artist |
| 1985 | Super Mario Bros. | Assistant director, graphic artist |
| 1986 | The Legend of Zelda | Director, graphic artist, writer |
| 1986 | Super Mario Bros.: The Lost Levels | Director, graphic artist |
| 1987 | Zelda II: The Adventure of Link | Writer |
| 1988 | Super Mario Bros. 3 | Director, graphic artist |
| 1990 | Super Mario World | Director |
| 1991 | The Legend of Zelda: A Link to the Past | Director |
| 1993 | The Legend of Zelda: Link's Awakening | Director |
| 1993 | Super Mario All-Stars | Director |
| 1995 | Yoshi's Island | Director |
| 1996 | Super Mario 64 | Assistant director |
| 1997 | BS The Legend of Zelda: Inishie no Sekiban | Supervisor |
| 1997 | Star Fox 64 | Supervisor |
| 1997 | Yoshi's Story | Producer |
| 1998 | The Legend of Zelda: Ocarina of Time | Supervisor |
| 1999 | Mario Golf | Supervisor |
| 2000 | The Legend of Zelda: Majora's Mask | Supervisor |
| 2000 | Mario Tennis | Supervisor |
| 2000 | Paper Mario | Supervisor |
| 2001 | The Legend of Zelda: Oracle of Seasons and Oracle of Ages | Supervisor |
| 2001 | Luigi's Mansion | Producer |
| 2001 | Pikmin | Progress manager |
| 2001 | Animal Crossing | Producer |
| 2002 | Super Mario Sunshine | Producer |
| 2002 | The Legend of Zelda: The Wind Waker | Producer |
| 2003 | Mario Kart: Double Dash | Producer |
| 2004 | The Legend of Zelda: The Minish Cap | Supervisor |
| 2004 | The Legend of Zelda: Four Swords Adventures | Supervisor |
| 2004 | Pikmin 2 | Producer |
| 2004 | Paper Mario: The Thousand-Year Door | Supervisor |
| 2005 | Yoshi Touch & Go | Producer |
| 2005 | Big Brain Academy | General producer |
| 2005 | Animal Crossing: Wild World | General producer |
| 2006 | New Super Mario Bros. | General producer |
| 2006 | Yoshi's Island DS | Senior producer |
| 2006 | The Legend of Zelda: Twilight Princess | Supervisor |
2007
| 2007 | Big Brain Academy: Wii Degree | General producer |
| 2007 | Mario Party 8 | Supervisor |
| 2007 | The Legend of Zelda: Phantom Hourglass | Supervisor |
| 2007 | Donkey Kong Barrel Blast | Supervisor |
| 2007 | Mario Party DS | Supervisor |
| 2007 | Link's Crossbow Training | Producer |
| 2008 | Wii Music | Producer |
| 2008 | Animal Crossing: City Folk | General producer |
| 2009 | Mario & Luigi: Bowser's Inside Story | Senior producer |
| 2009 | New Super Mario Bros. Wii | Producer |
| 2009 | The Legend of Zelda: Spirit Tracks | Supervisor |
| 2010 | Super Mario Galaxy 2 | Producer |
| 2011 | The Legend of Zelda: Ocarina of Time 3D | Senior producer |
| 2011 | The Legend of Zelda: Four Swords Anniversary Edition | Senior producer |
| 2011 | Super Mario 3D Land | General producer |
| 2011 | The Legend of Zelda: Skyward Sword | Supervisor |
| 2011 | Fortune Street | Supervisor |
| 2012 | New Super Mario Bros. 2 | Producer |
| 2012 | New Super Mario Bros. U | Producer |
| 2012 | Animal Crossing: New Leaf | General producer |
| 2013 | Mario & Luigi: Dream Team | Supervisor |
| 2013 | Super Mario 3D World | General producer |
| 2013 | The Legend of Zelda: A Link Between Worlds | Supervisor |
| 2014 | Yoshi's New Island | Producer |
| 2015 | Yoshi's Woolly World | Producer |
| 2015 | Super Mario Maker | Producer |
| 2015 | The Legend of Zelda: Tri Force Heroes | Supervisor |
| 2015 | Mario & Luigi: Paper Jam | Supervisor |
| 2016 | Tank Troopers | Supervisor |
| 2016 | Paper Mario: Color Splash | Supervisor |
| 2016 | Super Mario Maker for Nintendo 3DS | Producer |
| 2016 | Super Mario Run | Producer |
| 2017 | The Legend of Zelda: Breath of the Wild | Supervisor |
| 2017 | Arms | Production manager |
| 2017 | Hey! Pikmin | Producer |
| 2017 | Mario & Luigi: Superstar Saga + Bowser's Minions | Supervisor |
| 2018 | Mario & Luigi: Bowser's Inside Story + Bowser Jr.'s Journey | Supervisor |
| 2019 | New Super Mario Bros. U Deluxe | Producer |
| 2019 | Yoshi's Crafted World | Producer |
| 2019 | Super Mario Maker 2 | Producer |
| 2020 | Clubhouse Games: 51 Worldwide Classics | Producer |
| 2020 | Pikmin 3 Deluxe | Producer |
| 2023 | Pikmin 4 | Producer |
| 2023 | Super Mario Bros. Wonder | Producer |
| 2023 | Super Mario RPG | Supervisor |
| 2024 | Princess Peach: Showtime! | Senior supervisor |
| 2024 | Mario & Luigi: Brothership | Senior supervisor |
| 2026 | Super Mario Bros. Wonder + Meetup in Bellabel Park | Producer |
| 2026 | Yoshi and the Mysterious Book | Producer |
| 2026 | Pikmin 4 – Nintendo Switch 2 Edition + Dandori Academy | Producer |

Non-gaming credits

| 2023 | The Super Mario Bros. Movie | Nintendo creative executive |
| 2026 | The Super Mario Galaxy Movie | Nintendo team |
