= Shigefumi =

- Gender: Male

Origin
- Origin: Japanese
- Meaning: Different meanings depending on the kanji used

Shigefumi (written: 重文 or 成文) is a masculine Japanese given name. Notable people with the name include:

- Shigefumi Hino (日野 重文; born 1963), Japanese video game designer
- Shigefumi Matsuzawa (松沢 成文; born 1958), Japanese politician
- Shigefumi Mori (森 重文; born 1951), Japanese mathematician

== See also ==
- 6979 Shigefumi, a main-belt asteroid
