= Hajime Wakai =

Japanese composer (born 1973)

- 若井 淑
- Born: July 5, 1973 (age 53); Kyoto, Japan
- Education: Osaka College of Music
- Occupation: Composer
- Employer: Nintendo (1996–present)
- Musical career
- Genre: Video game music

Hajime Wakai (Japanese: 若井 淑, Hepburn: Wakai Hajime; born July 5, 1973) is a Japanese composer who is best known for his work on various Nintendo games, including Star Fox 64 (1997) and various games in the Pikmin and The Legend of Zelda series.

== Biography ==
Wakai was born on July 5, 1973, in Kyoto. After graduating from the Osaka College of Music in the spring of 1996, he joined Nintendo EAD. He initially worked alongside Koji Kondo on Star Fox 64, where he composed all the planetary and battle themes; he then went on to work on other Nintendo 64 titles, such as the Pokémon Stadium series.

On the GameCube, Wakai became the sole composer for the first Pikmin game, in which he also provided the voices for the titular creatures. He then went on to compose most of the battle themes for The Legend of Zelda: The Wind Waker, which were notable for their interactivity with Toon Link's on-screen actions as he fought enemies.

After working on titles such as Nintendogs and Star Fox: Command, Wakai served as sound director for several Wii titles until he was appointed lead composer for The Legend of Zelda: Skyward Sword, where he also coordinated the entire sound team; this title stood out as the first in the Zelda series to make extensive use of a live orchestra.

After working on several other titles, Wakai became the sound director for The Legend of Zelda: Breath of the Wild and contributed to the soundtrack; this title stood out for moving away from the traditional musical style of the Zelda series, placing an emphasis on ambient music and sound effects to do justice to the game's "open-air" concept. After working on this title, Wakai was appointed sound engineer for the entire Zelda series and later resumed the role of sound director for The Legend of Zelda: Tears of the Kingdom.

== Works ==
Year	Title	Notes
1997	Star Fox 64	Music with Koji Kondo
1997	Yoshi's Story	Sound effects with Yasushi Ida
1998	F-Zero X	Music with Taro Bando
1999	Pokémon Stadium	Music with Kenta Nagata and Toru Minegishi
2000	Pokémon Stadium 2	Music
2001	Pikmin	Music
2002	The Legend of Zelda: The Wind Waker	Music with Kenta Nagata, Toru Minegishi and Koji Kondo
2004	Pikmin 2	Music with Kazumi Totaka
2005	Nintendogs	Music
2006	New Super Mario Bros.	Music with Asuka Ota and Koji Kondo
2006	Star Fox Command	Music
2007	Big Brain Academy: Wii Degree	Sound direction
2008	Super Smash Bros. Brawl	Arrangement "Area 6 (Star Fox 64)" and "Area 6 Ver. 2 (Star Fox 64)"
2008	Mario Kart Wii	Sound support
2008	Wii Music	Sound direction; Music with Kenta Nagata, Toru Minegishi and Mahito Yokota
2011	The Legend of Zelda: Skyward Sword	Sound direction; Music with several others
2012	Nintendo Land	Sound direction
2013	Pikmin 3	Music with Asuka Hayazaki and Atsuko Asahi
2013	The Legend of Zelda: The Wind Waker HD	Music of the original; Arrangement with Kenta Nagata, Asuka Hayazaki and Atsuko Asahi
2014	Super Smash Bros. for Nintendo 3DS and Wii U	Arrangement "Tour (Animal Crossing: New Leaf)"
2016	Star Fox Zero	Sound supervision with Koji Kondo
2016	Star Fox Guard	Sound supervision with Koji Kondo
2017	The Legend of Zelda: Breath of the Wild	Sound direction; Music with Manaka Kataoka and Yasuaki Iwata
2017	Hey! Pikmin	Sound supervision with Mitsuhiro Hikino and Ryoji Yoshitomi
2018	Starlink: Battle for Atlas	Sound supervision with Koji Kondo
2018	Super Smash Bros. Ultimate	Supervision
2019	The Legend of Zelda: Link's Awakening	Sound supervision with Takahiro Watanabe
2020	Hyrule Warriors: Age of Calamity	Supervision
2021	The Legend of Zelda: Skyward Sword HD	Sound supervision
2023	The Legend of Zelda: Tears of the Kingdom	Sound direction; Music with several others
2024	The Legend of Zelda: Echoes of Wisdom	Music direction
2025	Hyrule Warriors: Age of Imprisonment	Supervision
2026	Star Fox	Supervision
