= Devil World =

1984 video game

- European box art
- Developers: Nintendo R&D1; Intelligent Systems
- Publisher: Nintendo
- Director: Shigeru Miyamoto
- Designers: Shigeru Miyamoto; Takashi Tezuka
- Composers: Koji Kondo; Akito Nakatsuka
- Platform: Nintendo Entertainment System
- Release: JP: October 5, 1984; EU: July 15, 1987
- Genre: Maze
- Modes: Single-player, multiplayer

Devil World (Note: Japanese: デビルワールド, Hepburn: Debiru Wārudo) is a maze video game developed by Nintendo and Intelligent Systems and published by Nintendo for the Family Computer and Nintendo Entertainment System. It was released for the Famicom in Japan on October 5, 1984, and for the Nintendo Entertainment System in Europe on July 15, 1987. It was re-released on the Wii's Virtual Console in Japan on January 22, 2008, and in PAL regions on October 31, 2008. Nintendo of America's content policies prohibiting religious icons prevented the game's release in North America. It is Shigeru Miyamoto's first console-exclusive game after a legacy of arcade development, and for many years was his only game not to be localized to North America until it was released as part of the Nintendo Classics service for Nintendo Switch on October 31, 2023.

== Gameplay ==
Gameplay screenshot

Devil World is a Pac-Man-styled maze game where player 1 controls Tamagon, a green dragon who decides to "attack the Devil's World", along with a red player 2 version of him. He navigates through a series of mazes patrolled by monsters, and touches Crosses to power up and summon the ability to breathe fire and eat the dots. Without a cross, he is completely helpless, and cannot complete the maze. The large winged demon simply called "the Devil" dances at the top of the screen, and will point in a direction for four of his minions to move the maze by using pulleys and ropes. This can be dangerous, as Tamagon will be squished if he is caught between a maze wall and the moving outer boundary. After the first maze is cleared, the next objective is to gather four Bibles and put them into a seal. The Bibles give Tamagon the same powers as the Crosses. After placing them into the seal, the Devil flies to the next maze. In between, a bonus maze shows up where Tamagon collects six Bonus Boxes under a time limit.

== Development ==
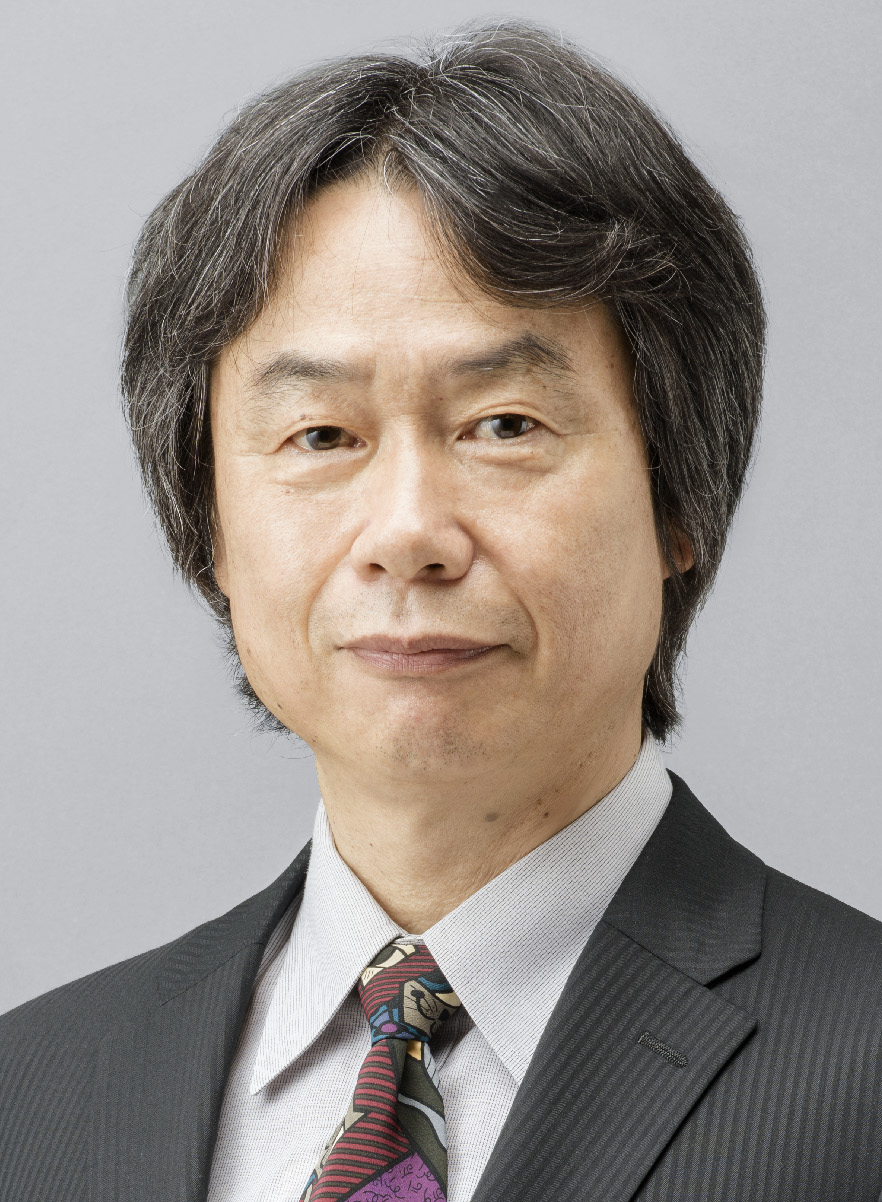
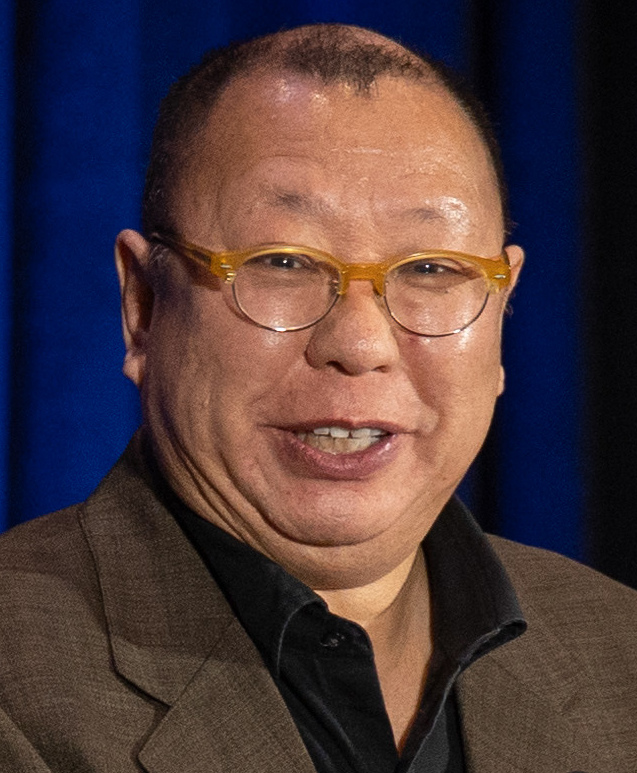
Designers Shigeru Miyamoto (left, pictured in 2015) and Takashi Tezuka (right, pictured in 2024)

Devil World was designed by Shigeru Miyamoto and Takashi Tezuka, and directed by Miyamoto as his first console-only game. The game provided Tezuka's first project when he joined Nintendo full-time in April 1984, 6 months before the game's release. Tezuka initially did not know of Pac-Man at the time, which has a resemblance to Devil World, but he enjoyed the game when he first played it. Among Tezuka's tasks was to create pixelated images based on Miyamoto's instructions. During development, Tezuka suggested holes the player's character would fall into, causing him to lose a turn. However, when they made a version to test his idea and tried it out, Tezuka was told that it was "a bit flat". They decided to return to the original feature of the character being squashed against the walls. The duo flew to Nintendo of America to show Devil World to its president Minoru Arakawa, but he did not wish to release the game in North America due to NOA's policies against the use of religious icons.

== Reception ==
Chris Kohler called Devil World "a typically ingenious Miyamoto-directed take on the maze genre, with inventive graphics and fun game play" which "absolutely could not be released in America" because its satanic and religious imagery "would be seen as unsettling or even blasphemous". On IGN's "Top 10 Pac-Man Clones", Devil World was ranked fourth. Eurogamer rated the Virtual Console release 7 out of 10 points. The reviewer said Devil World is "worth experiencing just for the bizarre nature of the concept", but also commented that its "abundance of ideas ultimately get in the way of the simple gameplay".
