= Shigefumi Hino =

Japanese graphics designer and game director (born 1963)

- 日野 重文
- Born: 1963 (age 62–63); Ibaraki Prefecture, Japan
- Occupations: Video game director, graphic designer, planner
- Years active: 1989-present
- Employer: Nintendo (since 1989)
- Notable work: Yoshi

Shigefumi Hino (日野 重文 Hino Shigefumi, born 1963) is a Japanese graphics designer, game director and planner from Nintendo. He is the creator of Yoshi from the Yoshi franchise. Hino later served as the director of the Pikmin series, alongside Masamichi Abe.

== Career ==
Shigefumi Hino joined Nintendo in 1989, where his first project was designing a sequel to Famicom Grand Prix: F1 Race, which was ultimately unreleased. His first released product was Super Mario World in 1990, where he created the game's pixel art, as well as the character Yoshi, based on a rough sketch by Takashi Tezuka. Afterwards, Hino had the idea for a game with Yoshi as the main character, which would become Yoshi's Island. He chose a hand-drawn visual style to differentiate it from Rare's Donkey Kong Country, a game that notably used pre-rendered 3D graphics.

Hino then co-directed Pikmin and Pikmin 2 with Masamichi Abe, as well as Pikmin 3 with Yuji Kando. He has additionally worked as a designer for Super Mario Maker, Super Mario Maker 2 and Super Mario Bros. Wonder.

== Works ==
Year	Title	Role
1990	Super Mario World	Character designer
1992	Yoshi's Cookie	Character designer
1993	The Legend of Zelda: Link's Awakening	Character designer
1995	Yoshi's Island	Director, character designer
1996	Super Mario 64	CG illustrator
1996	Tetris Attack	Design adviser
1996	Mario Kart 64	CG character designer
1997	Game & Watch Gallery 2	Design adviser
1997	Yoshi's Story	CG designer
1998	Pocket Monsters' Stadium	Effects designer
1998	Mario Party	Design support
1999	Game & Watch Gallery 3	Design adviser
1999	Pokémon Stadium	2D CG designer
2001	Pikmin	Director
2004	Pikmin 2	Director
2006	New Super Mario Bros.	Demo scene director
2007	Big Brain Academy: Wii Degree	Sub-director
2009	New Super Mario Bros. Wii	Planning
2013	Pikmin 3	Director
2015	Super Mario Maker	Planning
2016	Super Mario Maker for Nintendo 3DS	Game design
2019	Super Mario Maker 2	Game design
2023	Super Mario Bros. Wonder	Game design
