= Pikmin (video game) =

2001 video game

- North American GameCube box art
- Developer: Nintendo EAD
- Publisher: Nintendo
- Directors: Shigefumi Hino; Masamichi Abe
- Producer: Shigeru Miyamoto
- Designer: Hiroaki Takenaka
- Programmers: Colin Reed; Yuji Kando
- Writer: Motoi Okamoto
- Composer: Hajime Wakai
- Series: Pikmin
- Platforms: GameCube; Wii; Nintendo Switch
- Release: GameCube: JP: October 26, 2001; NA: December 3, 2001; PAL: June 14, 2002; Wii: JP: December 25, 2008; EU: February 6, 2009; AU: February 26, 2009; NA: March 9, 2009; Nintendo Switch; June 21, 2023
- Genres: Real-time strategy, puzzle
- Mode: Single-player

Pikmin (Note: Japanese: ピクミン, Hepburn: Pikumin) (Note: Also known by its official retronym Pikmin 1) is a 2001 real-time strategy puzzle video game developed and published by Nintendo for the GameCube. The game was created and produced by Shigeru Miyamoto, and is the first entry in the Pikmin series. The game's story focuses on an alien pilot, Captain Olimar, who crash lands on a mysterious planet and must make use of a native species called "Pikmin" to find his ship's missing parts in order to escape within 30 days. Players take control of Olimar and direct the different varieties of Pikmin to explore the game's various levels, overcoming obstacles and hostile creatures, in order to find and recover the missing ship parts.

Pikmin was well received by critics and was commercially successful, selling over one million copies worldwide. It spawned a series of sequels, starting with Pikmin 2, which was released in 2004. The game was ported to Wii in 2008 in Japan and 2009 for the rest of the world as part of the New Play Control! series, followed by a high-definition remaster for Nintendo Switch in 2023.

== Gameplay ==
Olimar, surrounded by Pikmin, stands by Pellet Posies (right) that can be brought to the Pikmin Onion to grow more Pikmin.

The main goal in the game is to retrieve ship parts by using the three varieties of Pikmin available in different combinations. Captain Olimar discovers multi-colored plant-animal hybrids that willingly follow his orders and help him recover the parts. All three of the Pikmin colors that Olimar discovers must be used in order to overcome various obstacles and complete the game. The Pikmin creatures come in three colors: red, yellow and blue. Red Pikmin are the first type found in the game, resistant to fire and the strongest type of Pikmin with respect to combat. Yellow Pikmin can be thrown higher than the other two and can carry explosives called "bomb rocks" . They are used in various tasks, including carrying objects and enemies, breaking down walls, and defeating enemies. Blue Pikmin are the only ones that are able to survive in water and throw Pikmin of other colors across it. Objects that can be carried vary between ship parts, enemy carcasses and pellets, which are brought back to a base camp established in the current zone, containing Olimar's ship and apparati representative of each kind of Pikmin called Onions, the latter which can convert carcasses and pellets to Pikmin seeds. Only one hundred Pikmin, whether planted or plucked, can be on the ground at a time.

The time limit is divided into 30 days. With the exception of the first day, which lasts until the player finds the first ship part, all days in the game are about thirteen minutes in length, which can prematurely end at the player's request or if Olimar's health, replenished at his spacecraft, is depleted from attacks by native creatures. The day also ends prematurely if all Pikmin in the zone go extinct, and the next day will begin with one new seed of every discovered kind of Pikmin. By the end of each day, Olimar needs to stop all work and bring as many Pikmin as possible back to the base camp so that they can flee the planet's nocturnal predators in the safety of their Onions, as they also provide Pikmin shelter and transportation between zones; any Pikmin who do not make it back to base are eaten by said predators on each night prior to Olimar's last day on the planet. At such time, Olimar will write a daily update to his ship log, which may be affected by events on that particular day, reflect on his efforts to escape, or provide useful gameplay hints. As more parts are recovered, the ship regains functionality and can bring Olimar to up to four new zones on the planet to find the remaining parts. The game has three different endings, depending on Olimar's progress in collecting ship parts. Collecting all thirty grants the best ending, while collecting at least the twenty-five mandatory parts within the 30-day time limit grants the normal ending. Failing to do so results in Olimar's ship's life support system failing and Olimar dying from oxygen poisoning.

Apart from the main gameplay, Pikmin also contains a Challenge Mode that is unlocked once Olimar gets all three types of Pikmin. Each of the five zones in the main game are available for play. The object of Challenge Mode is to grow the greatest number of Pikmin in one day as is possible.

== Plot ==
Captain Olimar, a tiny, one-inch tall humanoid from the planet Hocotate is vacationing in outer space. However, during his flight, a comet hits his spacecraft, the S.S. Dolphin, which then falls towards an uncharted planet. Parts of the spaceship fall off as it plummets to the ground and crashes. When he regains consciousness, Olimar finds out that the planet's atmosphere contains high levels of poisonous oxygen and he can stay on the planet for only thirty days before his life support system fails. Olimar must retrieve the lost parts so he can repair his spaceship and return to Hocotate.

To help Olimar are indigenous creatures called Pikmin, which are nearly extinct and unable to survive in the environment without direct leadership. Olimar helps the Pikmin reproduce by leading them into battle with the dangerous wildlife of the planet and carrying them back to their flying nests called Onions to produce seeds to grow more Pikmin. As this element of symbiosis develops, Olimar discovers parts of the Dolphin and travels across the Pikmin Planet, which is assumed to be Earth, albeit with fictional fauna and far after the extinction of humans. The game has three endings depending upon how many ship parts the player successfully reacquires. Two good endings occur should the player retrieve all thirty parts or twenty-five necessary parts, and a bad ending occurs should the player fail to find twenty-five parts.

In the best ending, Olimar successfully retrieves the final ship part from an Emperor Bulblax. That night, Olimar bids the Pikmin farewell before blasting off the planet. The Pikmin then fight off a large predator, having learned to survive on their own thanks to Olimar's guidance. As Olimar escapes the planet's atmosphere and flies home to Hocotate, many more Onions of differing colors rise above the planet's surface, suggesting many types of Pikmin yet undiscovered. Pikmin 2 establishes this as the canon ending.

If thirty days pass with all 25 required ship parts collected but not the 5 optional parts, Olimar is forced to hastily escape the planet before his life support system ceases function, leaving the Pikmin to fend for themselves, but Olimar nonetheless successfully escapes the planet. If Olimar is unable to collect all 25 required ship parts before thirty days pass, Olimar attempts to blast off the planet, only for the Dolphin to fail and crash back onto the surface. The Pikmin carry his body to the Onion and turn him into a cross between a Hocotatian and a Pikmin.

== Development ==
Pikmin was developed by Nintendo EAD. Shigefumi Hino and Masamichi Abe (who had directed 1080° Snowboarding) served as directors while Shigeru Miyamoto and Hiroyuki Kimura served as producer; it was one of the first planned GameCube first-party games.

The artstyle of the game was inspired by the works of Tim Burton, and the theming was inspired by Fantastic Planet, and The Selfish Gene by Richard Dawkins.

Colin Reed, who had programmed 1080° Snowboarding, programmed Pikmin. The foundation of Pikmin technology is in the animation and agency of a multitude of interacting characters. A technical demonstration called Super Mario 128 was shown at Nintendo Space World 2000, showing the performance of the prototype GameCube hardware by animating up to 128 copies of Mario at once. Miyamoto stated in 2007 that "most of you have already played [Super Mario 128] - but you played it in a game called Pikmin."

The name "Pikmin" derives from the Japanese word used during development to count the small creatures, ippiki, which became "Piki", then "Picky" and finally "Pikmin".

The development team of Pikmin expressed their initial trouble finding the game's direction. Hino explains:

I still can clearly recall the first time that I saw multiple Pikmin working together to carry a big opponent. Until then, we had been struggling to find the direction that this game should have, but when these "carry" actions were completed, we were able to determine the future of Pikmin.

The score was composed by Hajime Wakai, who was one of two composers for Star Fox 64.

A Microsoft Windows version of the game with debugging features used for development is hidden on the GameCube version's disc.

== Reception ==
Reception

Aggregate scores
Aggregator	Score
Metacritic	89/100 (GC); 77/100 (Wii); 82/100 (Switch)
OpenCritic	75% recommend(Remaster)

Review scores
Publication	Score
Famitsu	34/40
Game Informer	9.25/10
GamePro	5/5
GameSpot	8.9/10
IGN	9.1/10
Next Generation	4/5
Nintendo Life	9/10

Awards
Publication	Award
Game Critics Awards	Best Puzzle/Trivia/Parlor Game, E3 2001
BAFTA	Interactivity Award, 2002
Academy of Interactive Arts & Sciences	Outstanding Innovation in Console Gaming, 2002

Upon being revealed at E3 2001, Pikmin garnered positive reception. IGN praised it for its uniqueness and its stunning graphics, with only a few negative points such as a poor camera. It was awarded the title of "Best Puzzle/Trivia/Parlor Game" from the Game Critics Awards, beating out ChuChu Rocket! for the Game Boy Advance. It was also runner-up for "Most Original Game", losing out to Majestic. It was a nominee for GameSpot's annual "Best GameCube Game" and, among console games, "Most Innovative" awards. These went respectively to Super Smash Bros. Melee and Grand Theft Auto III.

Since its release for the GameCube, Pikmin has received positive reception. It holds an average score of 89/100 from Metacritic. It was given the award for interactivity from the British Academy of Film and Television Arts. Pikmin has received significant praise for its graphics, in particular the design of the surrounding environment. Gaming Age editor Craig Majaski described Pikmin as both stunning and having a detailed environment. Brian McTaggart of the Houston Chronicle praised it for its graphics, gameplay, and originality, but criticized it for being short. As of March 31, 2002, Pikmin has sold over one million copies.

Chris Slate reviewed the GameCube version of the game for Next Generation, rating it four stars out of five, and stated that "A charming, addictive game that backs up Nintendo's promise to innovate on GameCube. If you like puzzles, then get your thinking cap on and put those Pikmin to work."

During the 5th Annual Interactive Achievement Awards, the Academy of Interactive Arts & Sciences honored Pikmin with the "Innovation in Console Gaming" award, along with receiving nominations for "Console Game of the Year" and "Outstanding Achievement in Game Design".

=== Re-release versions ===
The Wii re-release of Pikmin was not as well-received as the GameCube version, though it still had mostly positive reception; it holds an average score of 77/100 from Metacritic.

In his review of the Nintendo Switch version, PJ O'Reilly of Nintendo Life described the remaster as "bare-bones". He compared it to Super Mario 3D All-Stars, where many of the graphical updates consist of upscaling as opposed to a more detailed reworking of the game's textures. He nonetheless praised the core game, calling it a "must-play" and giving the remaster a score of 8/10.

=== Sales ===
In its first week, Pikmin sold more than 101,000 copies. However, sales fell to only between 10,000 and 15,000 copies in the weeks following. Following the release of "Ai no Uta" by Strawberry Flower, an image song related to Pikmin, its sales recovered slightly to about 22,000 copies in a week. The song appeared in the Japanese commercials for the game, but soon became an unexpected hit song, eventually eclipsing Pikmin's sales. In the weeks of December 24, 2001, and January 6, 2002, Pikmin sold approximately 53,000 copies and 102,000 copies respectively. To date, Pikmin has sold at least 1.19 million copies worldwide; 680,000 in the United States and 507,011 in Japan. By January 3, 2010, the Wii version of Pikmin had sold 169,036 copies in Japan. Since its release, Pikmin has developed a vocal and devoted fanbase.

== Re-releases ==
Pikmin and its sequel Pikmin 2 are part of the New Play Control series, a selection of GameCube ports with additional support for features of the Wii. The port of Pikmin was announced on October 2, 2008, in a press conference held by Nintendo as one of the debut titles in the New Play Control line. It was later released on December 25, 2008, in Japan, February 6, 2009, in Europe and March 9, 2009, in North America (original version only). New Play Control! Pikmin uses the Wii Remote, and requires the player to point and click on the screen to do various tasks instead of manually moving a cursor with a control stick. It was also announced that the game saves day-by-day records of the player's playthrough, allowing the player to restart from any recorded day of their choice. In an interview, director Shigefumi Hino stated that besides adding motion controls, they wanted to include the ability to go back to saves they have made in the past, allowing players to replay all 30 days one by one in order to improve. HD remasters of Pikmin and Pikmin 2 for Nintendo Switch were announced and released digitally on June 21, 2023, and were released physically on September 22, 2023.
