= Pikmin 2 =

2004 video game

- North American GameCube box art
- Developer: Nintendo EAD
- Publisher: Nintendo
- Directors: Shigefumi Hino; Masamichi Abe
- Producers: Shigeru Miyamoto; Takashi Tezuka
- Designer: Hiroaki Takenaka
- Writers: Motoi Okamoto; Kazumi Yamaguchi
- Composers: Hajime Wakai; Kazumi Totaka
- Series: Pikmin
- Platforms: GameCube; Wii; Nintendo Switch
- Release: GameCube: JP: April 29, 2004; NA: August 30, 2004; EU: October 8, 2004; AU: November 4, 2004; Wii: JP: March 12, 2009; EU: April 24, 2009; AU: May 14, 2009; NA: June 10, 2012; Nintendo Switch: WW: June 21, 2023
- Genre: Real-time strategy
- Modes: Single-player, multiplayer

Pikmin 2 (Note: Japanese: ピクミン2, Hepburn: Pikumin Tsū) is a 2004 real-time strategy puzzle video game developed and published by Nintendo for the GameCube. It is the direct sequel to the 2001 game Pikmin and the second game in the Pikmin series. In the game, Captain Olimar returns to the Pikmin planet to collect valuable treasure after learning that the company he works for—Hocotate Freight—is on the verge of bankruptcy.

Like its predecessor, Pikmin 2 focuses on exploring an unknown planet's surface from a microscopic perspective, where the player directs the Pikmin to perform various tasks, such as destroying obstacles, defeating enemies, and retrieving objects. It introduces new gameplay mechanics, including the ability to control two different leaders at once and the addition of new Pikmin types.

Pikmin 2 received critical acclaim, gaining aggregate scores of 89.60% and 90% on GameRankings and Metacritic, respectively. Many critics praised the various additions and changes, such as the new Pikmin types, longer length of the story mode, new multiplayer modes, and the removal of the 30-day time limit imposed in the original game. Pikmin 2 was re-released as part of the New Play Control! series for the Wii in 2009 in Japan, Europe and Australia and it received a North American release three years later in 2012. An HD remaster of the game was released for the Nintendo Switch in June 2023. A sequel to the game, Pikmin 3, was released in 2013 for the Wii U.

== Gameplay ==
Pikmin 2 expands on the gameplay introduced in its predecessor, Pikmin. The player controls both Captain Olimar and Louie from a third-person microscopic perspective to retrieve treasures (which consist of human waste such as scrap metal and broken toys) from the surface of an unknown planet (called the "distant planet"). The gameplay focuses on leading and directing a horde of plant-like creatures called Pikmin to accomplish this mission. The Pikmin follow behind Olimar and/or Louie as they move around the field. The player can quickly throw individual Pikmin at enemies and obstacles, where they automatically engage in combat, destroying obstacles, or building bridges. The player can also direct the entire mob (or a subdivision) to swarm and attack enemies en masse. Because the player controls two leaders simultaneously, they can have the leaders separate with their own Pikmin hordes to complete multiple tasks at once. While the player can amass a limitless number of Pikmin, only up to 100 Pikmin are allowed on the field at any time.

The player simultaneously controls both Olimar (bottom) and Louie (top), who can each lead separate Pikmin groups. The varying Pikmin colors indicate their immunity to environmental hazards.

The player can only explore during the daylight and begins each day at sunrise, and must finish all tasks and collect all stray Pikmin before sunset. Pikmin that are left behind at sunset are lost to ferocious nocturnal predators, a mechanic that was also in Pikmin. Unlike Pikmin, the game lacks a time limit and gives the player an unlimited number of days.

The Pikmin themselves come in five distinct colors, which indicates their strength or immunity to hazards. Red, Blue, and Yellow Pikmin, which originally appeared in Pikmin, are resilient to fire, drowning, and electric hazards, respectively. Two new colors, Purple and White, are unique to Pikmin 2. White Pikmin are swifter than the other types, can resist poisonous gases and poison enemies if devoured, and can locate hidden treasures buried in the soil. Purple Pikmin, while not immune to any hazards, are slower but far stronger than the others and can lift as much as 10 ordinary Pikmin. They are also heavy, and can stun enemies when thrown at them. Because of these characteristics, the player must choose the Pikmin that are best-suited to the task at hand. The stalk on a Pikmin's head, topped with either a leaf, bud, or flower, indicates their swiftness and strength, growing upon consumption of nectar harvested from various sources. More Pikmin can be born by bringing pellets or enemy carcasses to the "Onion" motherships, where they can be safely stored and extracted. Purple and White Pikmin do not have their own Onions and are stored inside the Hocotate Ship, and are created by throwing existing Pikmin into rare flowers called Candypop Buds. The game also introduces a sixth Pikmin type, Bulbmin, which are resistant to all hazards but are only temporarily usable. Lastly, it introduces sprays that can be collected by harvesting certain plants. The purple spray can be sprayed on enemies, and causes them to temporarily be encased in stone, making them vulnerable to attacks. The red spray gives Pikmin a temporary boost to their speed and attack strength.

The player is able to explore four distinct locales on the distant planet, which vary in theme, enemies, and treasures found. The player is also accompanied by the Hocotate Ship's artificial intelligence, which gives them hints and input. When a treasure is found, the Pikmin carry it back to the Hocotate Ship, where it will be placed into the ship's cargo hold and its worth calculated. In addition to exploring the surface of each locale, there are caves scattered throughout the landscape, which the player, the Pikmin horde, and the ship's AI can enter. Caves contain multiple treasures and enemies spread across multiple sub-levels. Some enemies, such as the Waterwraith, are found only within caves. While inside a cave, time does not pass on the surface due to a time warp caused by a strong geomagnetic field, allowing the player to explore for an indefinite period of time before sunset. However, the Pikmin Onions do not follow the player, meaning that they must bring enough Pikmin beforehand to use within the cave. Caves are also home to larger, stronger enemies that serve as the game's bosses, which upon defeat award treasures that bestow new abilities to the player characters. Cave layouts are randomly generated, but certain floors are not, generally boss floors. Caves are also the only place to find the "Violet" or "Ivory" "Candypop Buds" that make Purple or White Pikmin. The player completes the game after collecting all 201 treasures.

=== Additional modes ===
In addition to the main single-player game mode, there is a two-player competitive mode and an unlockable challenge mode. In the competitive game mode, Olimar and Louie are each controlled by a player. In a capture the flag style gameplay, the player's objective is to either retrieve four yellow marbles or claim the opponent's marble using Pikmin. A player can launch attacks against the other's Pikmin to hinder the opponent's progress. When a player collects a cherry, an advantage is gained, such as gaining or flowering Pikmin or summoning enemies at the opponent's base.

The challenge mode is unlocked during the single-player game. One or two players can play this mode cooperatively. Each selectable level takes place in caves of varying depth, and the objective is to locate a Key treasure, used to open access to the next sub-level, within the specified time limit. The player completes the level upon finding the cave's exit, and is scored based on the treasures collected, the number of Pikmin surviving upon exit, and the time taken to complete the level.

== Plot ==
After the events of Pikmin, Captain Olimar returns to his home planet Hocotate. He learns from his employer (a space transport company) that his co-worker, Louie, lost a shipment of luxury carrots to a "space rabbit". The company is forced to take out a large loan to cover the loss, and immediately sells Olimar's ship. When Olimar drops a bottle cap he brought home as a souvenir, an intelligent company ship appraises it as considerably valuable. The company president orders Olimar and Louie to take this ship to the planet where the treasure was found, and collect more of it to save the company.

Olimar and Louie crash land and are separated, but are reunited with the support of the local pikmin. While collecting valuables, they encounter white and purple varieties of pikmin, which Olimar had not encountered before. Louie's crew notes indicate that he is only interested in cooking and eating the alien flora and fauna.

After finding enough treasure to cover the company debt, Olimar takes off for Hocotate, only to realize that Louie was somehow left behind. Olimar and the president decide to return to rescue Louie and collect more treasure to strengthen the company's finances. They eventually encounter him in a deep cave, atop a giant, weaponized spider-like creature called the Titan Dweevil. The various types of pikmin are needed to disarm and defeat it. Louie is recovered and the crew departs the planet, leaving the pikmin behind.

In a special epilogue, it is revealed that the missing shipment of luxury carrots was eaten by Louie, who falsified his report to the president to avoid trouble. A ship's log implies that he may have been controlling the Titan Dweevil.

== Development ==
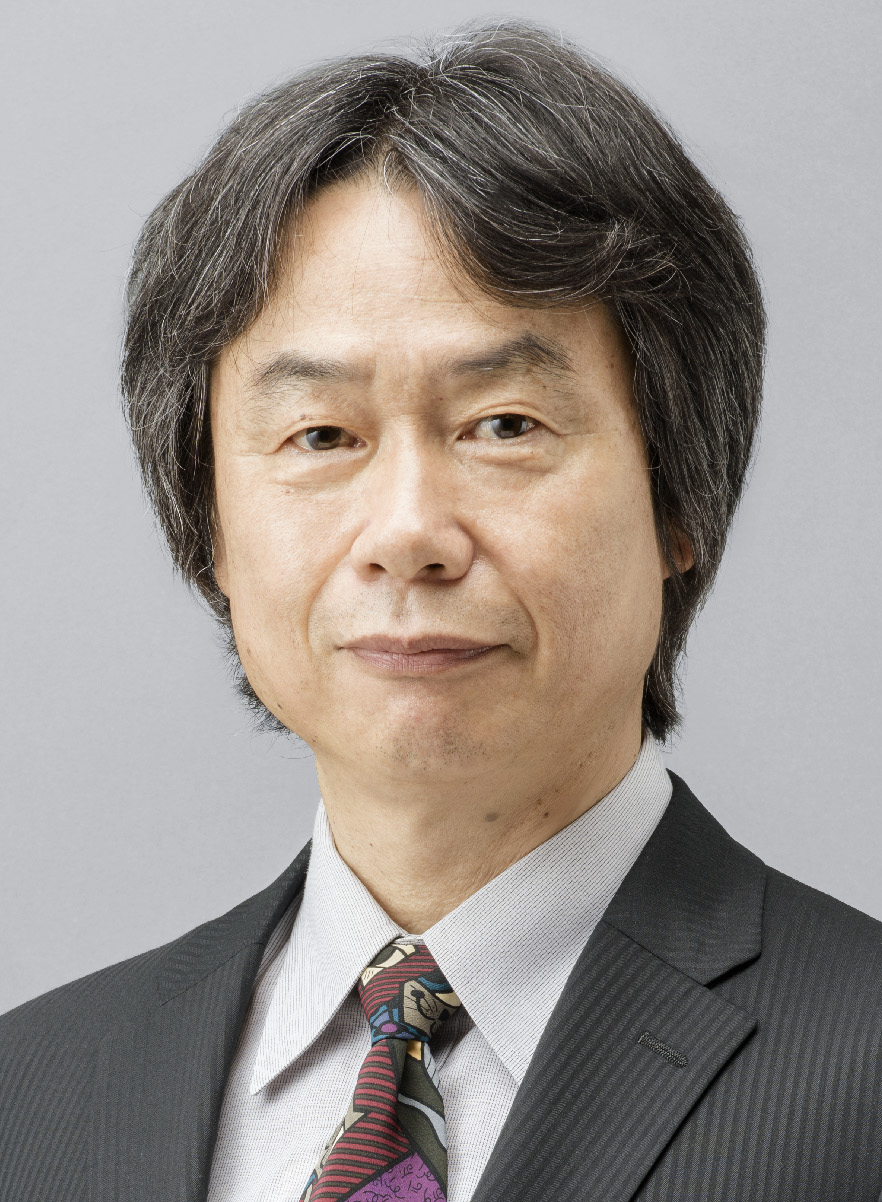
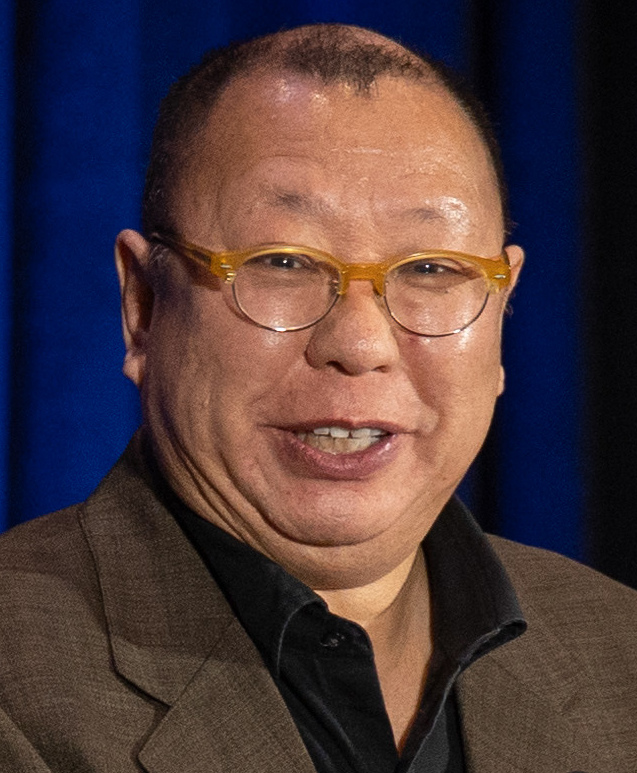
Producers Shigeru Miyamoto (left, pictured in 2015) and Takashi Tezuka (right, pictured in 2024).

In December 2002 a year following the release of Pikmin, game designer Shigeru Miyamoto confirmed a sequel to be in development. Development took about two and a half years; the original plan was to release it in Autumn 2003, but the team chose to delay it by six months to make further changes and revisions. Pikmin 2 was directed both by Shigefumi Hino, who focused on the graphics design, and Masamichi Abe, who focused on the game design. Miyamoto and Takashi Tezuka served as producers. Hajime Wakai composed the game soundtrack, while Kazumi Totaka served as the sound director; "Totaka's Song" is hidden twice in the game as an Easter egg. The 30-day time limit imposed in the original Pikmin was removed in order to allow players to explore the game world at a leisurely pace, which in turn increased the overall length of the game. Cooperative two-player gameplay within the main single player game was experimented, but it was found that it imposed limits on the overall game design. Multiplayer was thus relegated to a separate game mode. Pikmin 2 was first released in Japan on April 29, 2004, and then in North America, Europe, and Australasia later in the year. Nintendo e-Reader cards compatible with Pikmin 2 were released only in Japan, which contain additional minigames. Many of the treasures feature product placement for real-life brands such as Duracell. These were replaced with fictional brands in the Nintendo Switch remaster.

=== Re-releases ===
In 2009 both Pikmin and Pikmin 2 were re-released for the Wii as part of the New Play Control! brand, a selection of ported GameCube games with updated Wii Remote controls. Although New Play Control! Pikmin 2 was released in Japan, Europe, and Australia that year, it was not confirmed for a North American release until three years later in the June 2012 issue of Nintendo Power and was later confirmed for a June 2012 release. The North American localization of Pikmin 2's Wii port was released as a Nintendo Selects game along with the Nintendo Selects re-release of Mario Power Tennis and is the penultimate Wii game to be published by Nintendo of America. HD remasters of Pikmin and Pikmin 2 for Nintendo Switch were announced and released on June 21, 2023.

== Reception ==
=== Critical response ===
Reception

Aggregate scores
Aggregator	Score
GameRankings	(GC) 89.44% (Wii) 84.00%
Metacritic	(GC) 90/100
OpenCritic	70% recommend(Remaster)

Review scores
Publication	Score
1Up.com	A
Computer and Video Games	9/10 (Wii)
Eurogamer	9/10 (GC); 8/10 (Wii)
Famitsu	36/40
Game Informer	8.75/10
GamePro	5/5
GameSpot	9.2/10
GameZone	9.4/10
IGN	9.3/10
Nintendo World Report	9/10
X-Play	4/5

Pikmin 2 received critical acclaim, gaining an aggregate score of 89.44% on GameRankings based on 58 reviews, and an aggregate score of 90 on Metacritic based on 54 reviews. GameSpot named it the best GameCube game of August 2004. The February 2006 issue of Nintendo Power rated the game as the 47th best game made on a Nintendo System in its Top 200 Games list, and was also rated 29th on Official Nintendo Magazine's 100 greatest Nintendo games of all time. GamePro labeled it one of the top five GameCube games. In 2020, IGN placed the game at #6 on their list of "the top 20 GameCube games of all time".

Many critics considered the title to be superior to its predecessor Pikmin, expressing that Pikmin 2 addressed many problems or issues seen in the original game. The removal of the 30-day time limit originally used was applauded by many critics for increasing the game's longevity, though Nintendo World Report had mixed opinions, feeling that the lack of urgency might encourage players to be "lazy." The addition of a separate multiplayer mode was praised, though the lack of LAN online-play was a disappointment to some.

Pikmin 2's strategic and puzzle-oriented gameplay was praised by many. The artificial intelligence of the Pikmin was noted by GameSpot as improved over the original, though IGN remarked on reoccurring shortcomings, such as Pikmin getting stuck behind walls or breaking away from the group.

The graphics and presentation in Pikmin 2 were highly praised; many critics felt that they were greatly improved over the original game. IGN stated that "it's highly refreshing to see a Nintendo-created game with such undeniably high production values," noting the "photorealistic" environments, particle effects, character animation, and the observation that the game constantly runs at 30 frames-per-second. GameSpot agreed, expressing that "from a performance viewpoint, Pikmin 2 stands as an impressive achievement on the GameCube, especially since the improved visuals still move at a solid frame rate despite the increased detail." Tom Bramwell of Eurogamer called Pikmin 2 "relentlessly and giddily gorgeous." Other critics, such as X-Play, did not agree about the graphics, feeling the improvements were "marginal" at best. In addition, many reviews voiced minor complaints regarding the game's camera system, which was often obstructed by large objects in the playing field when positioned at certain angles.

The staff of X-Play nominated Pikmin 2 for their 2004 "Best Strategy Game" award, which ultimately went to Rome: Total War. During the 8th Annual Interactive Achievement Awards, the Academy of Interactive Arts & Sciences nominated Pikmin 2 for "Console Action/Adventure Game of the Year", which was ultimately awarded to Grand Theft Auto: San Andreas.

=== Re-releases ===
In his review of the Nintendo Switch version, PJ O'Reilly of Nintendo Life described the remaster as "bare-bones". He particularly lamented the replacement of the licensed brands with fictional ones, claiming that this makes it more difficult for players to notice a connection between Earth and the Pikmin planet. O'Reilly nonetheless gave the Nintendo Switch remaster an 8/10 score because of the core game's quality.

=== Sales ===
During the first week of its release, Pikmin 2 sold roughly 162,000 copies, going on to sell 483,000 total copies within Japan. For the New Play Control! re-release for the Wii, the game sold roughly 237,000 total copies in Japan during its lifetime.
