= List of Animal Crossing series characters =

Fictional characters by Nintendo

Animal Crossing series
- Several major recurring characters in the Animal Crossing series. From left: Blathers, K.K. Slider, Tom Nook, Timmy & Tommy, Isabelle, and Mabel.
- First appearance: Animal Crossing (2001)
- Created by: Nintendo EAD
- Designed by: Katsuya Eguchi

The life simulation video game series Animal Crossing, created by Katsuya Eguchi and first released in 2001 by Nintendo, features an assortment of recurring characters. Titles in the series follow the player character as they live in a village populated by anthropomorphic animals, with gameplay that proceeds in a nonlinear fashion and in-game events that occur in real-time. As of Animal Crossing: New Horizons, the most recent release in the series, there are over 400 animal characters that can potentially populate a player's village. In addition to these villager characters, Animal Crossing features characters that appear in the villages of all players; these characters typically serve a particular gameplay function, or appear at a specific in-game event.

== Characters ==
=== Introduced in Animal Forest and Animal Crossing ===
Animal Forest (どうぶつの森, Dōbutsu no Mori) was released for the Nintendo 64 in 2001 exclusively in Japan. An enhanced remake of the game for GameCube was released as Animal Forest+ in Japan, and as Animal Crossing worldwide. The games introduce many of the series' core recurring characters, notably businessman Tom Nook, traveling musician K.K. Slider, and Mr. Resetti, who lectures the player if they reset the game.

Character	Original Name	Species	Description
Alfonso	Aruberuto (アルベルト)	Alligator	A lazy villager. Also appears in the 2006 film Gekijōban Dōbutsu no Mori.
Ankha	Nairu (ナイル)	Cat	A snooty villager. First appeared in the GameCube game. Became well-known online in 2021 due to Ankha by Ankha, an animated porn parody that depicts Ankha rhythmically having sex with the player character to the beat of Croatian singer Sandy Marton's 1985 song "Camel by Camel". It was uploaded by animator Zone in January 2021 and went viral on TikTok in September 2021.
Apollo	Aporo (アポロ)	Bald eagle	A cranky villager. Also appears in the 2006 film Dōbutsu no Mori.
Blanca	Ayashī Neko (あやしいねこ; lit. Suspicious Cat)	Cat	A faceless cat who asks the player to draw their (his in Japan, her elsewhere) face. Hosts April Fool's Day in New Leaf.
Blathers	Fūta (フータ)	Great horned owl	A museum curator, paleontologist, and the brother of Celeste.
Booker	Omawari-san Bī (おまわりさんB; lit. 'Policeman B'), Monban-san Ē (もんばんさんA; lit. 'Gatekeeper A')	Dog (Bulldog)	He works as a police officer in Animal Crossing and New Leaf and as a gatekeeper in Wild World and City Folk.
Bunnie	Ririan (リリアン)	Rabbit	A peppy villager.
Cesar	Aran (アラン)	Gorilla	A cranky villager. Also appears in the 2006 film Dōbutsu no Mori.
Cheri	Aserora (アセロラ)	Bear cub	Peppy female villager who first appeared in Animal Crossing, was removed in Wild World, and returned in New Leaf.
Chip	Uomasa (うおまさ)	Beaver	Hosts the Fishing Tourney in all series titles except New Horizons. Father to C.J.
Copper	Omawari-san Ē (おまわりさんA; lit. 'Policeman A'), Monban-san Bī (もんばんさんB; lit. 'Gatekeeper B')	Dog (Akita)	Works as a police officer in Animal Crossing and New Leaf and as a gatekeeper in Wild World and City Folk.
Cyrano	Sakurajima (さくらじま)	Anteater	A cranky villager. Also appears in the 2006 film Dōbutsu no Mori.
Don Resetti	Raketto-san (ラケットさん; lit. 'Mr. Racket')	Mole	Lectures the player if they reset their game. Brother to Mr. Resetti.
Farley	Fārī (ファーリー)	Gnome	A spirit who lives inside the town fountain.
Franklin	Furankurin (フランクリン)	Turkey	Hosts the Harvest Festival.
Gracie	Gurēsu (グレース)	Giraffe	A fashion designer.
Gulliver (Note: Also known as Gullivarrr in New Horizons.)	Jonī (ジョニー)	Seagull	Appears as a marooned sailor in Animal Crossing, New Leaf, and New Horizons; and a stranded astronaut in Wild World and City Folk. In New Horizons, he also appears as a marooned pirate called Gullivarrr.
Hopper	Daruman (ダルマン)	Penguin	A cranky villager. Also appears in the 2006 film Dōbutsu no Mori.
Jack	Panpukingu (パンプキング)	—N/a	A pumpkin-headed character who hosts Halloween.
Jingle	Jinguru (ジングル)	Reindeer	Hosts Toy Day.
Joan	Kaburiba (カブリバ)	Wild boar	A vendor who sells turnips on the "stalk market".
K.K. Slider	Totakeke (とたけけ)	Dog (Jack Russell Terrier)	A traveling musician and DJ.
Kapp'n	Kappei (カッペイ)	Turtle (Note: Kapp'n, Leilani, Leila, and Grams are kappas in the original Japanese release.)	He has alternately worked as a row boat operator, a taxicab driver, and a bus driver. Husband to Leilani, father to Leila, and son of Grams.
Katrina	Hakkemī (ハッケミィ)	Panther	A fortune teller.
Mabel	Kinuyo (きぬよ)	Hedgehog	Co-owner of the Able Sisters tailor shop. Sister to Sable and Label.
Margie	Sarī (サリー)	Elephant	A normal villager. Also appears in the 2006 film Dōbutsu no Mori.
Pelly	Periko (ぺりこ)	Pelican	Works the day shift at the post office in Animal Crossing and New Leaf and at the town hall in Wild World and City Folk. Sister to Phyllis.
Pete	Perio (ぺりお)	Pelican	A mail carrier.
Phyllis	Perimi (ぺりみ)	Pelican	Works the night shift at the post office in Animal Crossing and New Leaf, and at the town hall in Wild World and City Folk. Sister to Pelly.
Porter	Ekiin-san (えきいんさん)	Monkey	A porter at the train station.
Redd	Tsunekichi (つねきち)	Fox (Note: Redd is a kitsune in the original Japanese release.)	Operates a black market goods store. Also known as Crazy Redd.
Mr. Resetti	Risetto-san (リセットさん; lit. 'Mr. Reset')	Mole	Lectures the player if they reset their game. Brother to Don Resetti.
Rosie	Būke (ブーケ)	Cat	A peppy cat villager. Also appears in the 2006 film Dōbutsu no Mori.
Rover	Mishiranu Neko (みしらぬネコ; lit. 'Unknown Cat')	Cat	A cat who assists the player in setting up the game.
Sable	Asami (あさみ)	Hedgehog	Co-owner of the Able Sisters tailor shop. Sister to Mabel and Label.
Saharah	Rōran (ローラン)	Camel	A traveling rug and carpet vendor.
Savannah	Sabanna (サバンナ)	Zebra	A normal villager, who is actually a horse villager.
Timmy & Tommy	Mamekichi (まめきち) and Tsubukichi (つぶきち)	Raccoon (Note: Timmy, Tommy, and Tom Nook are tanukis in the original Japanese release.)	Twin apprentices and nephews to Tom Nook.
Tom Nook	Tanukichi (たぬきち)	Raccoon	A businessman who manages the town shop and the player's home loan.
Tortimer	Kotobuki (コトブキ)	Tortoise	The mayor of the town. He later retires to live on a tropical island in New Leaf.
Villager	Murabito (むらびと)	Human	The player character, whose name, gender, appearance and house are customizable. In New Leaf, the first player to create a save file on each copy takes on the role of the town's mayor.
Wendell	Seiichi (セイイチ)	Walrus	A traveling artist.
Wisp	Yūtarō (ゆうたろう)	Ghost	A spirit who provides the player with rare items.

=== Introduced in Animal Crossing: Wild World ===
Animal Crossing: Wild World was released on the Nintendo DS in 2005.

Character	Original Name	Species	Description
Brewster	Masutā (マスター)	Rock Pigeon	Operates The Roost, a coffee shop.
Celeste	Fūko (フーコ)	Great Horned Owl	Works at the museum observatory. Sister to Blathers.
Champ	Saruo (さるお)	Monkey	A jock villager. Also appears in the 2006 film Dōbutsu no Mori.
Dr. Shrunk	Shishō (ししょー)	Axolotl	Teaches the player emotes, also known as "Reactions".
Harriet	Kattorīnu (カットリーヌ)	Dog (Poodle)	Operates a beauty salon called Shampoodle.
Kaitlin	Okā-san (おかあさん; lit. 'Mother')	Cat	Mother to Katie.
Katie	Maiko-chan (まいこちゃん)	Cat	A kitten who asks the player to reunite her with her mother Kaitlin.
Lyle	Honma-san (ホンマさん)	Otter	A businessman who alternately works as an insurance salesman and for the Happy Home Academy.
Pascal	Rakosuke (ラコスケ)	Otter	A traveling philosopher.
Whitney	Bianka (ビアンカ)	Wolf	A snooty villager. Also appears in the 2006 film Dōbutsu no Mori.

=== Introduced in Animal Crossing: City Folk ===
Animal Crossing: City Folk was released on the Wii in 2008.

Character	Original Name	Species	Description
Frillard	Kyoshō (きょしょー)	Frilled lizard	Teaches the player emotes.
Kicks	Shanku (シャンク)	Skunk	A shoeshiner and shoe salesman.
Label	Keito (ケイト)	Hedgehog	A fashion designer. Sister to Mabel and Sable. Also known as Labelle.
Lloid	Haniwa-kun (ハニワくん)	Haniwa	Operates the auction house in City Folk, and works as a construction worker in New Leaf and New Horizons.
Nat	Kameyama-san (カメヤマさん)	Chameleon	Hosts the Bug-Off in City Folk and New Leaf.
Pavé	Berurīna (ベルリーナ)	Peacock	Hosts Festivale.
Phineas	Paronchīno (パロンチーノ)	Sea lion	Rewards the player with gifts and merit badges.
Serena	Megami-sama (めがみさま)	Dog (Chihuahua)	A goddess who lives inside the city fountain.
Zipper T. Bunny	Pyontarō (ぴょんたろう)	Bunny	Hosts Bunny Day.

=== Introduced in Animal Crossing: New Leaf ===
Animal Crossing: New Leaf was released on the Nintendo 3DS in 2012. The game introduces Isabelle, a secretary at the town hall who has been described as a "fan-favorite" and a mascot of the Animal Crossing series. Additional content and characters were added to the game in Animal Crossing: New Leaf – Welcome Amiibo, a free update for the game released in late 2016.

Character	Original Name	Species	Description
Cyrus	Kaizō (カイゾー)	Alpaca	Works at Re-Tail, a refurbishment shop. Husband to Reese.
Digby	Kento (ケント)	Dog (Shih Tzu)	Works at the Happy Home Showcase. Twin brother to Isabelle.
Grams	Geko (ゲコ)	Turtle	Mother to Kapp'n, mother-in-law to Leilani, and grandmother to Leila.
Harvey	Panieru (パニエル)	Dog (Spaniel)	A hippie who operates the campground in New Leaf beginning in the Welcome amiibo update and Photopia in New Horizons.
Isabelle	Shizue (しずえ)	Dog (Shih Tzu)	A secretary and assistant to the player. Twin sister to Digby.
Leif	Reiji (レイジ)	Sloth	Operates the gardening store.
Leila	Kuku (クク)	Turtle	Daughter to Kapp'n and Leilani, and granddaughter to Grams.
Leilani	Kūko (クーコ)	Turtle	Wife to Kapp'n, mother to Leilani, and daughter-in-law to Grams.
Luna	Yumemi (ゆめみ)	Tapir	Operates the Dream Suite.
Reese	Risa (リサ)	Alpaca	Works at Re-Tail. Wife to Cyrus.

=== Introduced in Animal Crossing: New Horizons ===
Animal Crossing: New Horizons was released on the Nintendo Switch on March 20, 2020. Certain characters introduced in previous Animal Crossing titles were not present in the game at launch, but have been added through free downloadable content (DLC) updates. Other characters were added in Animal Crossing: New Horizons – Happy Home Paradise, a paid DLC update slated for release on November 5, 2021.

Character	Original Name	Species	Description
Audie	モニカ (Monica)	Wolf	A peppy villager. Supposedly named after an elderly woman who played New Leaf for over 3500 hours.
C.J.	Jasutin (ジャスティン)	Beaver	Hosts the Fishing Tourney and commissions fish models for the player. Son of Chip and roommate and business partner to Flick.
Daisy Mae	Uri (ウリ)	Wild boar	A turnip vendor and granddaughter of Joan.
Flick	Rekkusu (レックス)	Chameleon	Hosts the Bug-Off and makes insect models. Roommate and business partner to C.J.
Niko	(ニコ)	Monkey	A worker at Paradise Planning. Appears in Happy Home Paradise.
Orville	Mōrī (モーリー)	Dodo	A receptionist for Dodo Airlines. Younger brother of Wilbur. Named after Orville Wright.
Raymond	Jakku (ジャック)	Cat	A smug villager. The first Animal Crossing villager to have heterochromia. Noted by outlets as being especially popular in the game's trading and exchange economy.
Wardell	Nattī (ナッティー)	Manatee	A worker at Paradise Planning. Appears in Happy Home Paradise.
Wilbur	Rodorī (ロドリー)	Dodo	An Aircraft pilot for Dodo Airlines. Older brother of Orville. Named after Wilbur Wright.

=== Introduced in spin-off titles ===
Several spin-off Animal Crossing series titles have been produced, which feature their own original characters.

Character	Original Name	Species	Description
Ai	あい	Human	A female human villager. Protagonist of the 2006 film Dōbutsu no Mori.
Beppe	Pin-chan (ピンちゃん)	Blackbird	Works at OK Motors. Introduced in Animal Crossing: Pocket Camp.
Carlo	Gū-san (グーさん)	Blackbird	Works at OK Motors. Introduced in Animal Crossing: Pocket Camp.
Giovanni	Kyantarō (キャンタロー)	Blackbird	Works at OK Motors. Introduced in Animal Crossing: Pocket Camp.
Lottie	Takumi (タクミ)	Otter	Works at Nook's Homes. Niece to Lyle. Introduced in Animal Crossing: Happy Home Designer.
Yū	ゆう	Human	A male human villager. Appears in the 2006 film Dōbutsu no Mori.

== Appearances by title ==
Character	Doubutsu no Mori	Animal Crossing	Wild World	City Folk	New Leaf	New Horizons
Blanca	No	Yes	Yes	Yes	Yes	DLC
Blathers	Yes	Yes	Yes	Yes	Yes	Yes
Booker	Yes	Yes	Yes	Yes	Yes	DLC
Brewster	Yes	No	Yes	Yes	Yes	DLC
C.J.	No	No	No	No	No	Yes
Celeste	Yes	No	Yes	Yes	Yes	Yes
Chip	Yes	Yes	No	Yes	Yes	DLC
Copper	Yes	Yes	Yes	Yes	Yes	DLC
Cyrus	No	No	No	No	Yes	DLC
Daisy Mae	No	No	No	No	No	Yes
Digby	No	No	No	No	Yes	DLC
Don Resetti	No	Yes	No	Yes	Yes	DLC
Dr. Shrunk	Yes	No	Yes	Yes	Yes	DLC
Farley	No	Yes	No	No	No	No
Flick	No	No	No	No	No	Yes
Franklin	No	Yes	No	Yes	Yes	DLC
Frillard	No	No	No	Yes	No	No
Gracie	Yes	Yes	Yes	Yes	Yes	DLC
Grams	No	No	No	No	Yes	DLC
Gulliver	Yes	Yes	Yes	Yes	Yes	Yes
Harriet	No	No	Yes	Yes	Yes	DLC
Harvey	No	No	No	No	DLC	Yes
Isabelle	No	No	No	No	Yes	Yes
Jack	Yes	Yes	No	Yes	Yes	DLC
Jingle	Yes	Yes	No	Yes	Yes	DLC
Joan	Yes	Yes	Yes	Yes	Yes	DLC
K.K. Slider	Yes	Yes	Yes	Yes	Yes	Yes
Kaitlin	Yes	No	Yes	Yes	No	No
Kapp'n	Yes	Yes	Yes	Yes	Yes	DLC
Katie	Yes	No	Yes	Yes	Yes	DLC
Katrina	Yes	Yes	Yes	Yes	Yes	DLC
Kicks	No	No	No	Yes	Yes	Yes
Label	No	No	No	Yes	Yes	Yes
Leif	No	No	No	No	Yes	DLC
Leila	No	No	No	No	Yes	DLC
Leilani	No	No	No	No	Yes	DLC
Lloid	No	No	No	Yes	Yes	Yes
Lottie	No	No	No	No	No	DLC
Luna	No	No	No	No	Yes	DLC
Lyle	Yes	No	Yes	Yes	Yes	DLC
Mabel	Yes	Yes	Yes	Yes	Yes	Yes
Nat	No	No	No	Yes	Yes	DLC
Niko	No	No	No	No	No	DLC
Orville	No	No	No	No	No	Yes
Pascal	Yes	No	Yes	Yes	Yes	DLC
Pavé	No	No	No	Yes	Yes	DLC
Pelly	Yes	Yes	Yes	Yes	Yes	DLC
Pete	Yes	Yes	Yes	Yes	Yes	DLC
Phineas	No	No	No	Yes	Yes	DLC
Phyllis	Yes	Yes	Yes	Yes	Yes	DLC
Porter	Yes	Yes	No	No	Yes	DLC
Redd	Yes	Yes	Yes	Yes	Yes	DLC
Reese	No	No	No	No	Yes	DLC
Mr. Resetti	Yes	Yes	Yes	Yes	Yes	Yes
Rover	Yes	Yes	Yes	Yes	Yes	DLC
Sable	Yes	Yes	Yes	Yes	Yes	Yes
Saharah	Yes	Yes	Yes	Yes	Yes	Yes
Serena	No	No	No	Yes	No	No
Timmy & Tommy	Yes	Yes	Yes	Yes	Yes	Yes
Tom Nook	Yes	Yes	Yes	Yes	Yes	Yes
Tortimer	Yes	Yes	Yes	Yes	Yes	DLC
Villager	Yes	Yes	Yes	Yes	Yes	Yes
Wardell	No	No	No	No	No	DLC
Wendell	Yes	Yes	Yes	Yes	Yes	DLC
Wilbur	No	No	No	No	No	Yes
Wisp	No	Yes	No	Yes	DLC	Yes
Zipper T. Bunny	No	No	No	Yes	Yes	DLC
