= List of non-video game Nintendo products =

Nintendo is a Japanese multinational video game company headquartered in Kyoto. It develops, publishes, and manufactures both video games and video game consoles. While video games are their current main business, since its conception the company has been known to produce toys and playing cards. Currently, Nintendo still produces playing cards and toys, albeit with many of their non-video game products relating back to their video games.

== Toys and playing cards ==
Title	Release date	Developers	Ref.
Title	Japan	Developers	Ref.
Nintendo Hanafuda	1889	Nintendo	
Punch Race	1964	Nintendo	
Table Soccer	1965	Nintendo	
Time Bomb	1965	Nintendo	
Fifteengame	1965–1966	Nintendo	
My Car Race	1965–1966	Nintendo	
New Coaster Game	1965–1966	Nintendo	
Rabbit Coaster Game	1965–1966	Nintendo	
Transceiver Companion	1965–1966	Nintendo	
Home Bowling	1966	Nintendo	
Magic Roulette	1966	Nintendo	
Marble	1966	Nintendo	
Picture Cutter	1966	Nintendo	
Twister Game	1966	Nintendo	
Ultra Hand	1966	Nintendo	
Ultra Coaster	1967	Nintendo	
Ultra Machine	1967	Nintendo	
Hip Flip	1968	Nintendo	
N&B Block	1968	Nintendo	
People House	1968	Nintendo	
Challenge Dice	1969	Nintendo	
Love Tester	1969	Nintendo	
Candy Machine	1970	Nintendo R&D	
Dynamic Soccer	1970	Nintendo R&D	
Kōsenjū SP Electro Bird	1970	Nintendo R&D	
Kōsenjū SP Electro Lion	1970	Nintendo R&D	
Kōsenjū SP Electro Roulette	1970	Nintendo R&D	
Kōsenjū SP Electro Safari	1970	Nintendo R&D	
Kōsenjū SP Gun / Kōsenjū SP Rifle	1970	Nintendo R&D	
Kōsenjū SP Jumping Bottle	1970	Nintendo R&D	
Mamaberica	1970	Nintendo R&D	
Copilas	1971	Nintendo R&D	
Denki Dokei	1971	Nintendo R&D	
Hachi no Su Game	1971	Nintendo R&D	
Hopping Game	1971	Nintendo R&D	
Kaijū Copy	1971	Nintendo R&D	
Kōsen Denwa LT	1971	Nintendo R&D	
Kōsenjū Custom Lever Action Rifle	1971	Nintendo R&D	
Kōsenjū Custom Target	1971	Nintendo R&D	
Kōsenjū SP Electro Poker	1971	Nintendo R&D	
Mini Game	1971	Nintendo R&D	
Space Ball	1971	Nintendo R&D	
Twins	1971	Nintendo R&D	
Ultra Scope	1971	Nintendo R&D	
Ele-Conga	1972	Nintendo R&D	
Extra 4	1972	Nintendo R&D	
Kōya no Gunman Game	1972	Nintendo R&D	
Lefty RX	1972	Nintendo R&D	
Mach Rider	1972	Nintendo R&D	
Miracle Trump / Mahō no Trump	1972	Nintendo R&D	
Panda o Tsukurou Animal Block	1972	Nintendo R&D	
Time Shock	1972	Nintendo R&D	
Unirack	1972	Nintendo R&D	
Power Lift	1973	Nintendo R&D	
Hockey Game	1974	Nintendo R&D	
Paper Model	1974	Nintendo R&D	
Shotracer	1974	Nintendo R&D	
Mister Magician: Coin & Stick	1975	Nintendo R&D	
Punchbuoy	1975	Nintendo R&D	
Kōsenjū Custom Gunman	1976	Nintendo R&D	
Kōsenjū Custom Lion	1976	Nintendo R&D	
Kōsenjū Duck Hunt	1976	Nintendo R&D	
Ultra Machine DX	1977	Nintendo R&D	
Chiritorie	1979	Nintendo R&D1	
Ten Billion	1980	Nintendo R&D1	
Crossover	1981	Nintendo R&D1	
Kirby: Right Back at Ya! Trumps	2002	HAL Laboratory, Nintendo	
Densetsu no Starfy Trumps	2002	Tose, Nintendo	
Pokémon Rumble U NFC Figures	April 24, 2013 (Note: Released in North America on August 29, 2013 and Europe on August 15, 2013.)	Ambrella, Nintendo	
Fire Emblem 0 (Cipher)	2015	Intelligent Systems, Nintendo	
My Mario	August 26, 2025 (Note: Released worldwide on February 19, 2026, and more products are releasing in waves.)	Nintendo	
Talking Flower	March 12, 2026 (Note: Released worldwide on March 12, 2026.)	Nintendo	

=== Amiibo ===
amiibo releases

Licenses owned or co-owned by Nintendo
Title	Series	Release date			Ref.
Title	Series	JP	NA	PAL	Ref.
Donkey Kong	Super Smash Bros.	December 6, 2014	November 21, 2014	November 28, 2014	
Fox	Super Smash Bros.	December 6, 2014	November 21, 2014	November 28, 2014	
Link	Super Smash Bros.	December 6, 2014	November 21, 2014	November 28, 2014	
Mario	Super Smash Bros.	December 6, 2014	November 21, 2014	November 28, 2014	
Marth	Super Smash Bros.	December 6, 2014	November 21, 2014	November 28, 2014	
Peach	Super Smash Bros.	December 6, 2014	November 21, 2014	November 28, 2014	
Pikachu	Super Smash Bros.	December 6, 2014	November 21, 2014	November 28, 2014	
Samus	Super Smash Bros.	December 6, 2014	November 21, 2014	November 28, 2014	
Villager	Super Smash Bros.	December 6, 2014	November 21, 2014	November 28, 2014	
Wii Fit Trainer	Super Smash Bros.	December 6, 2014	November 21, 2014	November 28, 2014	
Yoshi	Super Smash Bros.	December 6, 2014	November 21, 2014	November 28, 2014	
Kirby	Super Smash Bros.	December 6, 2014	November 21, 2014	November 28, 2014	
Captain Falcon	Super Smash Bros.	December 6, 2014	December 14, 2014	December 19, 2014	
Diddy Kong	Super Smash Bros.	December 6, 2014	December 14, 2014	December 19, 2014	
Little Mac	Super Smash Bros.	December 6, 2014	December 14, 2014	December 19, 2014	
Luigi	Super Smash Bros.	December 6, 2014	December 14, 2014	December 19, 2014	
Pit	Super Smash Bros.	December 6, 2014	December 14, 2014	December 19, 2014	
Zelda	Super Smash Bros.	December 6, 2014	December 14, 2014	December 19, 2014	
Bowser	Super Smash Bros.	January 22, 2015	February 1, 2015	January 23, 2015	
Ike	Super Smash Bros.	January 22, 2015	February 1, 2015	January 23, 2015	
Lucario	Super Smash Bros.	January 22, 2015	February 1, 2015	January 23, 2015	
Rosalina	Super Smash Bros.	January 22, 2015	February 1, 2015	January 23, 2015	
Sheik	Super Smash Bros.	January 22, 2015	February 1, 2015	January 23, 2015	
Toon Link	Super Smash Bros.	January 22, 2015	February 1, 2015	January 23, 2015	
King Dedede	Super Smash Bros.	January 22, 2015	February 1, 2015	February 20, 2015	
Meta Knight	Super Smash Bros.	January 22, 2015	February 1, 2015	February 20, 2015	
Mega Man	Super Smash Bros.	February 19, 2015	February 1, 2015	February 20, 2015	
Mega Man Gold Edition (Note: Distributed by Capcom exclusively as a bundle with Mega Man Legacy Collection for Nintendo 3DS.)	Super Smash Bros.	Unreleased	February 1, 2015	Unreleased	
Shulk	Super Smash Bros.	February 19, 2015	February 1, 2015	February 20, 2015	
Sonic	Super Smash Bros.	February 19, 2015	February 1, 2015	February 20, 2015	
Bowser	Super Mario	March 12, 2015	March 20, 2015	March 20, 2015	
Luigi	Super Mario	March 12, 2015	March 20, 2015	March 20, 2015	
Mario	Super Mario	March 12, 2015	March 20, 2015	March 20, 2015	
Peach	Super Mario	March 12, 2015	March 20, 2015	March 20, 2015	
Toad	Super Mario	March 12, 2015	March 20, 2015	March 20, 2015	
Yoshi	Super Mario	March 12, 2015	March 20, 2015	March 20, 2015	
Mario Gold Edition	Super Mario	December 17, 2015	March 20, 2015	June 25, 2015 (Note: PAL version only released in Australia.)	
Charizard	Super Smash Bros.	April 29, 2015	May 29, 2015	April 24, 2015	
Lucina	Super Smash Bros.	April 29, 2015	May 29, 2015	April 24, 2015	
Ness	Super Smash Bros.	April 29, 2015	May 29, 2015	April 24, 2015	
Pac-Man	Super Smash Bros.	April 29, 2015	May 29, 2015	April 24, 2015	
Robin	Super Smash Bros.	April 29, 2015	May 29, 2015	April 24, 2015	
Wario	Super Smash Bros.	April 29, 2015	May 29, 2015	April 24, 2015	
Greninja	Super Smash Bros.	April 29, 2015	May 29, 2015	May 29, 2015	
Jigglypuff	Super Smash Bros.	April 29, 2015	May 29, 2015	May 29, 2015	
Inkling Boy	Splatoon	May 28, 2015	May 29, 2015	May 29, 2015	
Inkling Girl	Splatoon	May 28, 2015	May 29, 2015	May 29, 2015	
Inkling Squid	Splatoon	May 28, 2015	May 29, 2015	May 29, 2015	
Mario Silver Edition	Super Mario	Unreleased	March 20, 2015	May 30, 2015	
Dark Pit	Super Smash Bros.	June 11, 2015	July 31, 2015	June 26, 2015	
Ganondorf	Super Smash Bros.	June 11, 2015	September 11, 2015	June 26, 2015	
Palutena	Super Smash Bros.	June 11, 2015	July 24, 2015	June 26, 2015	
Zero Suit Samus	Super Smash Bros.	June 11, 2015	September 11, 2015	June 26, 2015	
Green Yarn Yoshi	Yoshi's Woolly World	July 16, 2015	October 16, 2015	June 26, 2015	
Light-Blue Yarn Yoshi	Yoshi's Woolly World	July 16, 2015	October 16, 2015	June 26, 2015	
Pink Yarn Yoshi	Yoshi's Woolly World	July 16, 2015	October 16, 2015	June 26, 2015	
Bowser Jr.	Super Smash Bros.	July 17, 2015	September 11, 2015	July 17, 2015	
Dr. Mario	Super Smash Bros.	July 17, 2015	September 11, 2015	July 17, 2015	
Olimar	Super Smash Bros.	July 17, 2015	September 11, 2015	July 17, 2015	
Animal Crossing amiibo cards series 1 (Note: Includes 100 unique cards, sold in blind booster packs containing six cards in North America and three cards in other regions.)	Animal Crossing	July 30, 2015	September 25, 2015	October 2, 2015	
Shizue (Note: Promotional Animal Crossing amiibo card distributed in Japan through the September–October 2015 issue of CharaParfait magazine.)	Animal Crossing	August 1, 2015	Unreleased	Unreleased	
Mario Classic Colors	Super Mario Bros. 30th Anniversary	September 10, 2015	September 11, 2015	September 11, 2015	
Mario Modern Colors	Super Mario Bros. 30th Anniversary	September 10, 2015	September 11, 2015	October 23, 2015	
Mii Brawler	Super Smash Bros.	September 10, 2015	November 1, 2015	September 25, 2015	
Mii Gunner	Super Smash Bros.	September 10, 2015	November 1, 2015	September 25, 2015	
Mii Swordfighter	Super Smash Bros.	September 10, 2015	November 1, 2015	September 25, 2015	
Dark Hammer Slam Bowser (Note: Distributed by Activision exclusively through the Skylanders: SuperChargers Racing Dark Edition Starter Pack bundle for the Wii. The amiibo can also function as a Skylander figure in Skylanders: SuperChargers, Skylanders: SuperChargers Racing, and Skylanders: Imaginators.)	Skylanders: SuperChargers	Unreleased	September 20, 2015	September 25, 2015	
Dark Turbo Charge Donkey Kong (Note: Distributed by Activision exclusively through the Skylanders: SuperChargers Dark Edition Starter Pack bundle for the Wii U. The amiibo can also function as a Skylander figure in Skylanders: SuperChargers, Skylanders: SuperChargers Racing, and Skylanders: Imaginators.)	Skylanders: SuperChargers	Unreleased	September 20, 2015	September 25, 2015	
Hammer Slam Bowser (Note: Distributed by Activision through the Skylanders: SuperChargers Racing Starter Pack bundle for the Wii and Nintendo 3DS at launch. Then, in January 2016, it became available separately bundled with its corresponding vehicle toy. The amiibo can also function as a Skylander figure in Skylanders: SuperChargers, Skylanders: SuperChargers Racing, and Skylanders: Imaginators.)	Skylanders: SuperChargers	Unreleased	September 20, 2015	September 25, 2015	
Turbo Charge Donkey Kong (Note: Distributed by Activision through the Skylanders: SuperChargers Starter Pack bundle for the Wii U at launch. Then, in January 2016, it became available separately bundled with its corresponding vehicle toy. The amiibo can also function as a Skylander figure in Skylanders: SuperChargers, Skylanders: SuperChargers Racing, and Skylanders: Imaginators.)	Skylanders: SuperChargers	Unreleased	September 20, 2015	September 25, 2015	
Duck Hunt	Super Smash Bros.	October 29, 2015	September 25, 2015	September 25, 2015	
Mr. Game & Watch	Super Smash Bros.	October 29, 2015	September 25, 2015	September 25, 2015	
R.O.B.	Super Smash Bros.	Unreleased	September 25, 2015	September 25, 2015	
Chibi-Robo	Chibi-Robo!	Unreleased	September 25, 2015	September 25, 2015	
Mewtwo	Super Smash Bros.	October 29, 2015	November 13, 2015	October 29, 2015	
Animal Crossing amiibo cards series 2	Animal Crossing	October 29, 2015	January 22, 2016	November 20, 2015	
R.O.B. Famicom Colors	Super Smash Bros.	October 29, 2015	March 18, 2016	March 18, 2016	
Falco	Super Smash Bros.	November 5, 2015	November 20, 2015	November 20, 2015	
Cyrus	Animal Crossing	November 21, 2015	November 13, 2015	November 20, 2015	
Digby	Animal Crossing	November 21, 2015	November 13, 2015	November 20, 2015	
Goldie (Note: Promotional Animal Crossing amiibo card only available in the Animal Crossing: amiibo Festival game bundle.)	Animal Crossing	November 21, 2015	November 13, 2015	November 20, 2015	
Isabelle Winter Outfit	Animal Crossing	November 21, 2015	November 13, 2015	November 20, 2015	
K.K.	Animal Crossing	November 21, 2015	November 13, 2015	November 20, 2015	
Mabel	Animal Crossing	November 21, 2015	November 13, 2015	November 20, 2015	
Reese	Animal Crossing	November 21, 2015	November 13, 2015	November 20, 2015	
Rosie	Animal Crossing	November 21, 2015	November 13, 2015	November 20, 2015	
Stitches	Animal Crossing	November 21, 2015	November 13, 2015	November 20, 2015	
Tom Nook	Animal Crossing	November 21, 2015	November 13, 2015	November 20, 2015	
Mega Yarn Yoshi	Yoshi's Woolly World	December 10, 2015	November 15, 2015	November 27, 2015	
Lottie	Animal Crossing	November 21, 2015	November 22, 2015	November 20, 2015	
Blathers	Animal Crossing	December 17, 2015	January 22, 2016	January 29, 2016	
Celeste	Animal Crossing	December 17, 2015	January 22, 2016	January 29, 2016	
Kicks	Animal Crossing	December 17, 2015	January 22, 2016	January 29, 2016	
Lucas	Super Smash Bros.	December 17, 2015	January 22, 2016	January 29, 2016	
Resetti	Animal Crossing	December 17, 2015	January 22, 2016	January 29, 2016	
Animal Crossing amiibo cards series 3	Animal Crossing	January 14, 2016	March 18, 2016	March 18, 2016	
Wolf Link	The Legend of Zelda: Twilight Princess	March 10, 2016	March 4, 2016	March 4, 2016	
Totakeke (Note: Promotional Animal Crossing amiibo card distributed in Japan through the April-June 2016 issue of Pikopuri magazine.)	Animal Crossing	March 15, 2016	Unreleased	Unreleased	
Isabelle Summer Outfit	Animal Crossing	March 24, 2016	June 10, 2016	March 18, 2016	
Kapp'n	Animal Crossing	March 24, 2016	March 18, 2016	March 18, 2016	
Rover	Animal Crossing	March 24, 2016	March 18, 2016	March 18, 2016	
Roy	Super Smash Bros.	April 28, 2016	March 18, 2016	March 18, 2016	
Ryu	Super Smash Bros.	April 28, 2016	March 18, 2016	March 18, 2016	
Timmy & Tommy	Animal Crossing	March 24, 2016	March 18, 2016	March 18, 2016	
Animal Crossing amiibo cards series 4	Animal Crossing	March 24, 2016	June 10, 2016	June 17, 2016	
King Dedede	Kirby	April 28, 2016	June 10, 2016	June 10, 2016	
Kirby	Kirby	April 28, 2016	June 10, 2016	June 10, 2016	
Meta Knight	Kirby	April 28, 2016	June 10, 2016	June 10, 2016	
Waddle Dee	Kirby	April 28, 2016	June 10, 2016	June 10, 2016	
Callie	Splatoon	July 7, 2016	July 8, 2016	July 8, 2016	
Inkling Boy (Purple)	Splatoon	July 7, 2016	July 8, 2016	July 8, 2016	
Inkling Girl (Lime Green)	Splatoon	July 7, 2016	July 8, 2016	July 8, 2016	
Inkling Squid (Orange)	Splatoon	July 7, 2016	July 8, 2016	July 8, 2016	
Marie	Splatoon	July 7, 2016	July 8, 2016	July 8, 2016	
Boo	Super Mario	October 20, 2016	November 4, 2016	October 7, 2016	
Donkey Kong	Super Mario	October 20, 2016	November 4, 2016	October 7, 2016	
Rosalina	Super Mario	October 20, 2016	November 4, 2016	October 7, 2016	
Wario	Super Mario	October 20, 2016	November 4, 2016	October 7, 2016	
Daisy	Super Mario	October 20, 2016	November 4, 2016	November 4, 2016	
Diddy Kong	Super Mario	October 20, 2016	November 4, 2016	November 4, 2016	
Waluigi	Super Mario	October 20, 2016	November 4, 2016	November 4, 2016	
Animal Crossing Welcome amiibo - amiibo cards (Note: Includes 50 unique cards, sold in blind booster packs containing six cards in North America and three cards in other regions.)	Animal Crossing	November 3, 2016	December 2, 2016	November 11, 2016	
Animal Crossing Welcome amiibo - amiibo cards Sanrio Collaboration pack (Note: Includes six unique cards, sold as a complete six-card pack in North America (exclusively at Target Corporation in the United States) and Europe, and as blind two-card booster packs exclusively through 7-Eleven stores in Japan.)	Animal Crossing	November 3, 2016	March 26, 2021	November 25, 2016	
Link - Ocarina of Time	The Legend of Zelda 30th	December 1, 2016	December 2, 2016	December 2, 2016	
Link - The Legend of Zelda	The Legend of Zelda 30th	December 1, 2016	December 2, 2016	December 2, 2016	
Toon Link - The Wind Waker	The Legend of Zelda 30th	December 1, 2016	December 2, 2016	December 2, 2016	
Zelda - The Wind Waker	The Legend of Zelda 30th	December 1, 2016	December 2, 2016	December 2, 2016	
Poochy	Yoshi's Woolly World	January 19, 2017	February 3, 2017	February 3, 2017	
Qbby	BoxBoy!	January 19, 2017	February 3, 2017	February 3, 2017	
Bokoblin	The Legend of Zelda: Breath of the Wild	March 3, 2017			
Guardian	The Legend of Zelda: Breath of the Wild	March 3, 2017			
Link (Archer)	The Legend of Zelda: Breath of the Wild	March 3, 2017			
Link (Rider)	The Legend of Zelda: Breath of the Wild	March 3, 2017			
Zelda	The Legend of Zelda: Breath of the Wild	March 3, 2017			
Mario Sports Superstars amiibo cards (Note: Includes 90 unique cards, sold in blind booster packs containing five cards (one of each sport in every pack).)	Mario Sports Superstars	March 30, 2017	March 24, 2017	March 10, 2017	
Alm	Fire Emblem	April 20, 2017	April 19, 2017	April 19, 2017	
Celica	Fire Emblem	April 20, 2017	April 19, 2017	April 19, 2017	
Link - Majora's Mask	The Legend of Zelda	June 23, 2017			
Link - Skyward Sword	The Legend of Zelda	June 23, 2017			
Link - Twilight Princess	The Legend of Zelda	June 23, 2017			
Pikmin	Pikmin	July 13, 2017	July 28, 2017	July 28, 2017	
Bayonetta	Super Smash Bros.	July 21, 2017			
Bayonetta Player 2	Super Smash Bros.	July 21, 2017			
Cloud	Super Smash Bros.	July 21, 2017			
Cloud Player 2	Super Smash Bros.	July 21, 2017			
Corrin	Super Smash Bros.	July 21, 2017			
Corrin Player 2	Super Smash Bros.	July 21, 2017			
Inkling Boy (Neon Green)	Splatoon	July 21, 2017			
Inkling Girl (Neon Pink)	Splatoon	July 21, 2017			
Inkling Squid (Neon Purple)	Splatoon	July 21, 2017			
Metroid	Metroid	September 15, 2017			
Samus Aran	Metroid	September 15, 2017			
Chrom	Fire Emblem	September 28, 2017	October 20, 2017	October 20, 2017	
Tiki	Fire Emblem	September 28, 2017	October 20, 2017	October 20, 2017	
Goomba	Super Mario	October 5, 2017	October 6, 2017	October 6, 2017	
Koopa Troopa	Super Mario	October 5, 2017	October 6, 2017	October 6, 2017	
Bowser Wedding Outfit	Super Mario Odyssey	October 27, 2017			
Mario Wedding Outfit	Super Mario Odyssey	October 27, 2017			
Peach Wedding Outfit	Super Mario Odyssey	October 27, 2017			
Daruk	The Legend of Zelda: Breath of the Wild	November 10, 2017			
Mipha	The Legend of Zelda: Breath of the Wild	November 10, 2017			
Revali	The Legend of Zelda: Breath of the Wild	November 10, 2017			
Urbosa	The Legend of Zelda: Breath of the Wild	November 10, 2017			
Super Mario Cereal (Note: Promotional cereal box released in the United States through a partnership between Nintendo and Kellogg's, featuring a built-in NFC tag compatible with generic amiibo functionality.)	Super Mario	Unreleased	December 11, 2017	Unreleased	
Detective Pikachu	Detective Pikachu	March 23, 2018			
Marina	Splatoon	July 13, 2018			
Pearl	Splatoon	July 13, 2018			
Octoling Boy	Splatoon	November 9, 2018			
Octoling Girl	Splatoon	November 9, 2018			
Octoling Octopus	Splatoon	November 9, 2018			
Inkling	Super Smash Bros.	December 7, 2018			
Ridley	Super Smash Bros.	December 7, 2018			
Wolf	Super Smash Bros.	December 7, 2018			
Ice Climbers	Super Smash Bros.	February 15, 2019			
King K. Rool	Super Smash Bros.	February 15, 2019			
Piranha Plant	Super Smash Bros.	February 15, 2019			
Daisy	Super Smash Bros.	April 12, 2019			
Ken	Super Smash Bros.	April 12, 2019			
Young Link	Super Smash Bros.	April 12, 2019			
Isabelle	Super Smash Bros.	July 19, 2019	July 26, 2019	July 19, 2019	
Pichu	Super Smash Bros.	July 19, 2019	July 26, 2019	July 19, 2019	
Pokémon Trainer	Super Smash Bros.	July 19, 2019	July 26, 2019	July 19, 2019	
Ivysaur	Super Smash Bros.	September 20, 2019			
Link	The Legend of Zelda: Link's Awakening	September 20, 2019			
Snake	Super Smash Bros.	September 20, 2019			
Squirtle	Super Smash Bros.	September 20, 2019			
Chrom	Super Smash Bros.	November 8, 2019	November 15, 2019	November 15, 2019	
Incineroar	Super Smash Bros.	November 8, 2019	November 15, 2019	November 15, 2019	
Simon	Super Smash Bros.	November 8, 2019	November 15, 2019	November 15, 2019	
Dark Samus	Super Smash Bros.	January 17, 2020			
Richter	Super Smash Bros.	January 17, 2020			
Hero	Super Smash Bros.	September 25, 2020	October 2, 2020	September 25, 2020	
Joker	Super Smash Bros.	September 25, 2020	October 2, 2020	September 25, 2020	
Daisy Power-Up Band (Note: Exclusively distributed at Super Nintendo World theme parks by Universal Destinations & Experiences.)	Super Nintendo World	February 4, 2021	February 17, 2023	Unreleased	
Luigi Power-Up Band	Super Nintendo World	February 4, 2021	February 17, 2023	Unreleased	
Mario Power-Up Band	Super Nintendo World	February 4, 2021	February 17, 2023	Unreleased	
Peach Power-Up Band	Super Nintendo World	February 4, 2021	February 17, 2023	Unreleased	
Toad Power-Up Band	Super Nintendo World	February 4, 2021	February 17, 2023	Unreleased	
Yoshi Power-Up Band	Super Nintendo World	February 4, 2021	February 17, 2023	Unreleased	
Cat Mario	Super Mario	February 12, 2021			
Cat Peach	Super Mario	February 12, 2021			
Banjo & Kazooie	Super Smash Bros.	March 26, 2021			
Byleth	Super Smash Bros.	March 26, 2021			
Terry	Super Smash Bros.	March 26, 2021			
Zelda & Loftwing - Skyward Sword	The Legend of Zelda	July 16, 2021			
E.M.M.I.	Metroid Dread	October 8, 2021	October 8, 2021	November 5, 2021	
Samus	Metroid Dread	October 8, 2021	October 8, 2021	November 5, 2021	
Animal Crossing amiibo cards series 5 (Note: Includes 48 unique cards, sold in blind booster packs containing six cards in North America and three cards in other regions.)	Animal Crossing	November 5, 2021			
Min Min	Super Smash Bros.	April 29, 2022			
Alex	Super Smash Bros.	September 9, 2022			
Steve	Super Smash Bros.	September 9, 2022			
Inkling (Yellow)	Splatoon	November 11, 2022			
Octoling (Blue)	Splatoon	November 11, 2022			
Smallfry	Splatoon	November 11, 2022			
Kazuya	Super Smash Bros.	January 13, 2023			
Sephiroth	Super Smash Bros.	January 13, 2023			
Golden Power-Up Band	Super Nintendo World	March 18, 2023	February 17, 2024	Unreleased	
Link	The Legend of Zelda: Tears of the Kingdom	May 12, 2023			
Mythra	Super Smash Bros.	July 21, 2023			
Pyra	Super Smash Bros.	July 21, 2023			
Ganondorf	The Legend of Zelda: Tears of the Kingdom	November 3, 2023			
Zelda	The Legend of Zelda: Tears of the Kingdom	November 3, 2023			
Big Man	Splatoon	November 17, 2023			
Frye	Splatoon	November 17, 2023			
Shiver	Splatoon	November 17, 2023			
Mio	Xenoblade Chronicles 3	January 19, 2024			
Noah	Xenoblade Chronicles 3	January 19, 2024			
Sora	Super Smash Bros.	February 16, 2024			
Callie (Alterna)	Splatoon	September 5, 2024			
Marie (Alterna)	Splatoon	September 5, 2024			
Marina (Side Order)	Splatoon	September 5, 2024			
Pearl (Side Order)	Splatoon	September 5, 2024			
Diddy Kong Power-Up Band	Super Nintendo World	December 11, 2024	May 22, 2025	Unreleased	
Donkey Kong Power-Up Band	Super Nintendo World	December 11, 2024	May 22, 2025	Unreleased	
Riju	The Legend of Zelda: Tears of the Kingdom	June 5, 2025			
Sidon	The Legend of Zelda: Tears of the Kingdom	June 5, 2025			
Tulin	The Legend of Zelda: Tears of the Kingdom	June 5, 2025			
Yunobo	The Legend of Zelda: Tears of the Kingdom	June 5, 2025			
Donkey Kong & Pauline	Donkey Kong Bananza	July 17, 2025			
Luigi (Note: Included as wooden figures in various Wood Block sets from the My Mario product line.)	My Mario Wood Blocks	August 26, 2025	February 19, 2026	February 19, 2026	
Mario	My Mario Wood Blocks	August 26, 2025	February 19, 2026	February 19, 2026	
Peach	My Mario Wood Blocks	August 26, 2025	February 19, 2026	February 19, 2026	
Yoshi	My Mario Wood Blocks	August 26, 2025	February 19, 2026	February 19, 2026	
Samus	Metroid Prime 4: Beyond	November 6, 2025			
Samus & Vi-O-La	Metroid Prime 4: Beyond	November 6, 2025			
Bandana Waddle Dee & Winged Star	Kirby Air Riders	November 20, 2025			
Kirby & Warp Star	Kirby Air Riders	November 20, 2025			
Sylux	Metroid Prime 4: Beyond	December 4, 2025			
Meta Knight & Shadow Star	Kirby Air Riders	March 5, 2026			
Invincible Power-Up Band	Super Nintendo World	March 18, 2026	Unreleased	Unreleased	
Captain Toad & Talking Flower	Super Mario Bros. Wonder	March 26, 2026			
Elephant Mario	Super Mario Bros. Wonder	March 26, 2026			
Poplin & Prince Florian	Super Mario Bros. Wonder	March 26, 2026			
Mario & Luma	Super Mario Galaxy + Super Mario Galaxy 2	April 2, 2026			
Rosalina & Lumas	Super Mario Galaxy + Super Mario Galaxy 2	April 2, 2026			
King Dedede & Tank Star	Kirby Air Riders	July 2, 2026			
Big Man (Splatoon Raiders)	Splatoon Raiders	July 23, 2026			
Frye (Splatoon Raiders)	Splatoon Raiders	July 23, 2026			
Shiver (Splatoon Raiders)	Splatoon Raiders	July 23, 2026			
Chef Kawasaki & Hop Star	Kirby Air Riders	September 3, 2026			
Mineru's Construct	The Legend of Zelda: Tears of the Kingdom	September 17, 2026			

== Electro-mechanical games ==
Title	Manufacturer(s)	Release date		Ref.
Title	Manufacturer(s)	JP	NA	Ref.
Laser Clay Shooting System	Nintendo R&D	1973	Unreleased	
Mini Laser Clay	Nintendo R&D	1974	Unreleased	
Fascination (Note: Promotional prototype)	Nintendo R&D	1974	Unreleased	
Wild Gunman (Note: Published first in North America by Sega and later by Bally.)	Nintendo R&D	1974	January 1976	
SmashMatic	Nintendo R&D	Summer 1975	Unreleased	
Shooting Trainer	Nintendo R&D	1975	January 1976	
EVR Race	Nintendo R&D, Mitsubishi	1975	Unreleased	
EVR Baseball	Nintendo R&D, Mitsubishi	1976	Unreleased	
Sky Hawk (Note: Published first in North America by Empire and later by Bally.)	Nintendo R&D	1976	November 1976	
Battle Shark (Note: Published by Empire in North America.)	Nintendo R&D	1977	1978	
Dead Line	Nintendo R&D	1977	Unreleased	
Test Driver	Nintendo R&D1	October 1978	Unreleased	
Fancy Ball	Nintendo R&D1	1978	Unreleased	
New Shooting Trainer	Nintendo R&D1	1978	Unreleased	

== Officially-licensed without direct Nintendo involvement ==
=== Medal games, redemption games, slot machines ===
Title	Developer(s)	Publisher(s)	Release date			Ref.
Title	Developer(s)	Publisher(s)	JP	NA	PAL	Ref.
Mario Roulette	Konami	Konami	1991	Unreleased	Unreleased	
Mario World	Banpresto	Banpresto	1991	Unreleased	Unreleased	
Piccadilly Circus: Super Mario Bros. 3	Konami	Konami	1991	Unreleased	Unreleased	
Mini Piccadilly Super Mario Bros. 3	Konami	Konami	1992	Unreleased	Unreleased	
Mini Piccadilly Super Mario World	Konami	Konami	1992	Unreleased	Unreleased	
Pika Pika Mario	Banpresto	Banpresto	1992	Unreleased	Unreleased	
Super Mario World	Fabtek, Inc.	Fabtek, Inc.	Unreleased	1993	Unreleased	
Go! Go! Mario Circuit	Banpresto, Takara	Atlus	1994	Unreleased	Unreleased	
Super Mario Kart Doki Doki Race	Banpresto, Takara	Atlus	1994	Unreleased	Unreleased	
Donkey Kong	Maygay	Maygay	Unreleased	Unreleased	1996	
Mario Kart 64	Maygay	Maygay	Unreleased	Unreleased	1996	
Mario no Medal Island	Sunwise	Epoch	1996	Unreleased	Unreleased	
Super Donkey Kong 2 Swanky no Bonus Slot	Sunwise	Epoch	1996	Unreleased	Unreleased	
Super Mario Attack	Banpresto	Banpresto	1996	Unreleased	Unreleased	
Super Mario 64	Maygay	Maygay	Unreleased	Unreleased	1997	
Super Donkey Kong Ukkii Donkey	Banpresto	Banpresto	1990s	Unreleased	Unreleased	
Dokidoki Mario Chance!	Banpresto	Banpresto	March 2003	Unreleased	Unreleased	
Super Mario Fushigi no Janjan Land	Capcom	Capcom	April 2004	Unreleased	Unreleased	
Super Mario Fushigi no Korokoro Party	Capcom	Capcom	September 2004	Unreleased	Unreleased	
Donkey Kong Jungle Fever	Capcom	Capcom	August 2005	Unreleased	Unreleased	
Super Mario Fushigi no Korokoro Party 2	Capcom	Capcom	October 2005	Unreleased	Unreleased	
Hoshi no Kirby ~Kirakira Medal Land~	Atlus	Atlus	March 2006	Unreleased	Unreleased	
Donkey Kong: Banana Kingdom	Capcom	Capcom	November 16, 2006	Unreleased	Unreleased	
Pocket Monsters Sōnansu ga Koronda!	Namco Bandai	Banpresto	2006	Unreleased	Unreleased	
Hoshi no Kirby Medal Land no Mahō no Tō	Atlus	Atlus	December 2007	Unreleased	Unreleased	
Mario Party Fushigi no Korokoro Catcher	Capcom	Bandai Namco	October 2009	Unreleased	Unreleased	
Pokémon Kurukuru Get	Namco Bandai	Namco Bandai	April 2010	Unreleased	Unreleased	
Pokémon Tsunahiki Taikai Medal Zettai Get da ze!	Banpresto	Banpresto	2010	Unreleased	Unreleased	
New Super Mario Bros. Wii Coin World	Capcom	Capcom	April 2011	Unreleased	Unreleased	
Pokémon Medal World	Namco Bandai	Namco Bandai	January 17, 2012	Unreleased	Unreleased	
Mario Party Kurukuru Carnival	Capcom	Capcom	July 2012	Unreleased	Unreleased	
Mario Party Fushigi no Korokoro Catcher 2	Capcom	Capcom	April 2013	Unreleased	Unreleased	
Pokémon Battle Nine	Bandai Namco Amusement	Bandai Namco Amusement	July 8, 2014	Unreleased	Unreleased	
Mario Party Fushigi no Challenge World	Capcom	Capcom	July 2016	2017 (Note: Only saw a limited release in North America as its localization was canceled and all prototype units were sold off and can be found in the wild.)	Unreleased	
Pokémon COROGARENA	Sega	Sega	March 14, 2022	Unreleased	Unreleased	

=== Electro-mechanical games ===
Title	Manufacturer(s)	Release date			Ref.
Title	Manufacturer(s)	JP	NA	PAL	Ref.
Guru Guru Mario	Banpresto	1991	Unreleased	Unreleased	
Super Mario Bros.	Gottlieb	1992	April 25, 1992	Unreleased	
Super Mario Bros. Mushroom World	Gottlieb	1992	June 1992	Unreleased	
Fūsenkōjō	Banpresto	1993	Unreleased	Unreleased	
Super Mario World Koopa Taiji	Banpresto	1993	Unreleased	Unreleased	
Super Mario World Popcorn	Banpresto	1993	Unreleased	Unreleased	
Janken Fukubiki	Banpresto	1994	Unreleased	Unreleased	
Wario Busters	Banpresto	1994	Unreleased	Unreleased	
Mario Bowl	Banpresto	1995	Unreleased	Unreleased	
Can Can Club Super Mario Yoshi Island	Banpresto	1996	Unreleased	Unreleased	
Magical Seven Super Mario Yoshi Island	Banpresto	1996	Unreleased	Unreleased	
Super Mario Yoshi Island Note Chance	Banpresto	1996	Unreleased	Unreleased	
Super Mario Yoshi Janken Keshigomu	Banpresto	1996	Unreleased	Unreleased	
Super Mario Yoshi Island Note Chance	Banpresto	1996	Unreleased	Unreleased	
Odotte! Pikachu	Banpresto	December 1999	Unreleased	Unreleased	
Pikachu no Naminori Dai Bōken	Sammy Corporation	2000	Unreleased	Unreleased	
Mario Factory	MIA Co., Ltd	2000's	Unreleased	Unreleased	
Pokémon Mega Get!	Bandai Namco Amusement	November 2015	Unreleased	Unreleased	
Hoshi no Kirby Pakupaku Gourmet Race	Bandai Namco Amusement	October 2022	Unreleased	Unreleased	
Pokémon Mega Get! Nagetore BOX	Bandai Namco Amusement	October 2022	Unreleased	Unreleased	
Pokémon Pro	Stern Pinball	February 13, 2026			
Pokémon Premium	Stern Pinball	February 13, 2026			
Pokémon Limited Edition	Stern Pinball	February 13, 2026			
