= Animal Crossing (disambiguation) =

Animal Crossing is a series of video games produced by Nintendo.

Animal Crossing may also refer to:

- Animal Crossing series:
  - Animal Crossing (video game), for GameCube
  - Animal Crossing: Wild World, for Nintendo DS
  - Animal Crossing: City Folk, for Wii
  - Animal Crossing: New Leaf, for Nintendo 3DS
  - Animal Crossing: Pocket Camp, for iOS/Android devices
  - Animal Crossing: New Horizons, released on March 20, 2020, for Nintendo Switch
  - Animal Crossing: The Movie, the animated film based on the series
- Wildlife crossing, a structure letting wildlife cross a man-made barrier
- Hybrid (biology), the result of crossing two animals or plants
