= Zipper T. Bunny =

Fictional character from the Animal Crossing franchise

- Animal Crossing character
- Zipper T. Bunny as he appears in Animal Crossing: New Horizons
- First game: Animal Crossing: City Folk (2008)

In-universe information
- Species: Rabbit (contested)
- Gender: Male

Zipper T. Bunny (ぴょんたろう, Pyontarō; Pyontarō in the original Japanese version) is a character in the Animal Crossing series, having first appeared in the 2008 release of Animal Crossing: City Folk for the Nintendo Wii. He is a yellow anthropomorphic rabbit who appears on the Animal Crossing equivalent of Easter Day, Bunny Day, tasking the player with finding eggs across the town.

Zipper has garnered negative reception, with his appearance and mannerisms criticised as creepy and unsettling, as well as the mechanics of his event interfering with everyday activities such as fishing. The character has also attracted both critics and fans of the series to theorise over whether Zipper is another character in a costume or a real rabbit.

== Design and characteristics ==
Zipper T. Bunny appears as a yellow rabbit with wide-open eyes, floppy ears, and blue overalls. Zipper is seen as the mascot of Bunny Day, the Animal Crossing series' equivalent to Easter, with Zipper being equated to being the Easter Bunny. Zipper is typically depicted as being in a constant state of happiness, by cheerfully hopping and frequently speaking in rhymes to the player. However, if out of view of the player, Zipper will become exhausted and tired, even expressing displeasure for his job.

Zipper's name likely stems from the large silver zipper on his back. If the player approaches the zipper, Zipper apprehensively warns the player to not go "snoopin'" around. The zipper is an implication that Zipper's rabbit appearance is actually a costume, despite his insistence that it is not, although it could also be a zipper for his overalls.

== Appearances ==
Zipper made his debut in Animal Crossing: City Folk, in which he show up in the player's town to bury "Bunny Day eggs" in the ground for Bunny Day; eggs containing either candy or foils, with the latter being tradeable with Zipper for egg-themed items. Zipper returned in City Folk's follow-up Animal Crossing: New Leaf. On Bunny Day, Zipper will appear in the player's town plaza asking the player to hunt for six different types of eggs; each obtained by the player performing different tasks using their tools. These eggs can contain tickets if consumed and can be traded in for prizes, with Zipper giving the player a gift upon finding each type of egg. Zipper also appeared in New Leaf's "Welcome amiibo" update, where the player could visit his RV at the campsite. In the follow-up to New Leaf, Animal Crossing: New Horizons, Zipper appears to coincide with Bunny Day once again. Similar to New Leaf, Zipper appears on the player's island and ask the player to collect many eggs of six different types, obtained using the players tool; with the eggs being used to craft Bunny Day furniture. The player can give three of the same type of egg to Zipper in-exchange for a different type of egg. In New Horizons, Bunny Day celebrations last for twelve days up to Easter Sunday, as opposed to the previous entries which only last for a day on Easter Sunday. This time frame was later shortened to eight days in 2021.

Aside from the main series titles, Zipper has appeared in the 2015 spinoff Animal Crossing: Happy Home Designer, with the Animal Crossing Twitter account promoting this fact by making Zipper's house a reference to the Alice in Wonderland tea party scene. In 2018, Zipper was added to the mobile game Animal Crossing: Pocket Camp as part of an Alice in Wonderland inspired event. Zipper was featured in the fourth series of the Animal Crossing amiibo card set.

== Reception ==
Zipper T. Bunny has received generally negative reception. Writing for Forbes, Dave Thier described Zipper as being "incredibly creepy" due to him to him sneaking up on the player and lack of footprints; adding that Zipper was "horrifying in a sort of saccharine way that only Nintendo is really capable [of] producing". Kotaku Australia's Ruby Innes described Zipper as an "evil vile creature", mentioning that she found him and his schtick untrustworthy and that his dead eyed expression made her feel threatened. Junkee writer Michelle Rennex Fletcher spoke about she felt Zipper's "huge bug eyes" coupled with his behaviour made her views of Zipper go from "cute to down-right scary", noting him as unsettling compared to the cuter aspects of New Horizons. Varnson from Screen Rant named Zipper to be the worst character in the series, critique the character's intentions as "creepy and sinister", as well as calling him fake whenever the character accidentally drops his "happy facade".

Also writing for Screen Rant, Laura Gray noted how different Zipper's appearance was compared to the series' large cast of rabbit villagers, describing his still face and lack of expressions and reactions made him appear unnatural. Additionally, she was critical of Zipper's dialogue to the player, recounting his use of catchphrases and sarcastic language as "unpleasant [and] abrasive", remarking that Zipper "does not have the hidden charms of Tom Nook" and calling for him to be replaced as the mascot of Bunny Day. GameSpot's Olivia Harris made similar negative comments about Zipper's design, noting that compared to the other rabbit villagers Zipper looked like a "child’s drawing of a rabbit than a real one"; describing this aspect as "strange" and "weird". Writing for VentureBeat, Jeff Grubb conversely stated he was a fan of Zipper's creepy appearance, stating he dug the character's serial killer vibe.

Zipper's zip has been the subject of many theories about whether or not he is wearing a costume

Since his debut in City Folk, his design has led both fans and critics alike to theorise that he's actually a character in a rabbit costume. This theory originates from the large zipper on his back; which if the player tries to get to, leads him to get defensive and telling the player to "not ruin the magic". This has led to further speculation about who is underneath the costume; with reoccurring special characters such as Redd and Lyle, as well as the villager Hopkins being considered. A prominent rumour suggested that Tom Nook wears the costume, with the rumour claiming that both characters have body structure and the "T" in Zipper T. Bunny standing for Tom. Touching on the theory, Eurogamer's Emma Kent expressed fondness for an extension of the theory, where Tom's nephews Timmy and Tommy are wearing the costume by stacking on top of each other. Another theory suggested Zipper was actually Tortimer, a character that had previously been the town's mayor in many games in the series, with many who follow the theory pointing to the "T" in Zipper's full name standing for Tortimer. GamesRadar+'s Sam Loveridge has provided support for this theory, suggesting Zipper's lack of physical fitness matched with the older, less agile characteristics of Tortimer.

Within the fandom, Zipper was met with similar disapproval, with many fans expressing fear or contempt for him. Some fans resorted to tormenting the character using tools or landscaping equipment to trap him in cages or even pentagrams. Online, he has often been compared to characters such as Robbie the Rabbit or the animatronics from the Silent Hill and Five Nights at Freddy's series respectively. However, some fans of the series expressed sympathy for the character due to an animation of Zipper in-game where he drops his typical cheerful hopping movements and sighs whenever the player is out of his line of sight. Both Polygon and GameSpot wrote about how this animation made Zipper relatable "especially for anyone who’s familiar with working highly social jobs", with the latter comparing Zipper to employees of Chuck E. Cheese. In article for Automaton Media, Yuki Kurosawa reported how some players also took pity on Zipper, believing that he is forced to prepare all the eggs himself and as such should not be treated as a villain. In an interview with Nintendo Power, City Folk's associate localization producer, Ann Lin, stated that Zipper was her favourite character; adding that she found the mystery behind whether or not he was in a suit to be the coolest aspect of the character, with fellow interviewee Reiko Ninomiya describing it as "creepy-awesome".

New Horizons's initial Bunny Day event in 2020 was met with negative reception from the fandom for its twelve-day length, as well as getting in the way of players' daily routines in the game. This caused Zipper to be the focal point of the resentment due to his association with the event as its mascot. According to an article by Screen Rant, they explained how many felt Zipper stayed on the player's island long past his stay, adding that the character's design and peppy attitude was of concern compared to other series characters that host holiday events. In an article for Polygon, Patricia Hernandez believed that Zipper had trolled the Animal Crossing fandom, as the final reward given to the player was instructions on how to build a toy in the character's own likeness, with Hernandez exclaiming that "Zipper got the last laugh here". According to GamesRadar+, Animal Crossing fans used Zipper in memes demonstrating their fear for the impending return of Bunny Day the following year.
