= Isabelle (Animal Crossing) =

Fictional character from the Animal Crossing franchise

- Animal Crossing character
- Isabelle from Animal Crossing: New Horizons
- First game: Animal Crossing: New Leaf (2012)

In-universe information
- Species: Dog (Shih Tzu)
- Family: Digby (brother)

Isabelle, known as Shizue (しずえ) in Japanese, is a character from the Animal Crossing series of video games. She is a gentle Shih Tzu that debuted in the 2012 release Animal Crossing: New Leaf, where she serves as the secretary to the player character.

She has featured in several other game franchises, including as a playable character in Mario Kart 8 and Super Smash Bros. Ultimate. Isabelle has received positive reception, to the point of becoming one of the most prominent characters in the Animal Crossing franchise and its de facto mascot.

== Concept and creation ==
Isabelle is a golden-coloured Shih Tzu, originally named Shizue in Japanese. The development team of New Leaf created her after deciding that the player-controlled mayor needed an assistant. They focused on making a "very affectionate" character who was loyal and helpful, and thus chose to make a female dog who was "a little bit clumsy... but still very cute". Animal Crossing designers wanted players to reject Isabelle's offer of a ceremony for various accomplishments as mayor at least once so that they feel bad about having done so. Animal Crossing director Katsuya Eguchi and New Leaf producer Aya Kyogoku both enjoyed Isabelle; Eguchi appreciated her for her smile, friendliness, and clumsiness.

Isabelle's appearance in Super Smash Bros. Ultimate is based on fellow Animal Crossing character Villager. However, Super Smash Bros. series director Masahiro Sakurai chose not to make Isabelle an "Echo Fighter" (a character with relatively minor differences from another) of Villager because of her different animations and her proportions being based on character models in Animal Crossing: New Leaf, as opposed to earlier Animal Crossing character models.

== Appearances ==
Isabelle first appeared in the 2012 video game Animal Crossing: New Leaf along with her twin brother Digby. In the game, she acts as the secretary to the player character, who becomes the town mayor, and assists them with various tasks. She has appeared in several Animal Crossing games since, including Animal Crossing: Happy Home Designer, Animal Crossing: amiibo Festival, Animal Crossing: Pocket Camp, and Animal Crossing: New Horizons. Outside of the Animal Crossing franchise, Isabelle has also appeared in the Super Smash Bros. series, first appearing as an assist trophy in Super Smash Bros. for Nintendo 3DS and Wii U before becoming a playable fighter in the Nintendo Switch sequel Super Smash Bros. Ultimate. As a playable fighter, multiple of Isabelle's moves reference commonly used items in the Animal Crossing series, for example, a fishing rod, and a net. Isabelle also appears in the Wii U video game Mario Kart 8 as a downloadable racer, as well as in its Nintendo Switch port Mario Kart 8 Deluxe. Player costumes based on Isabelle appear in Super Mario Maker and Monster Hunter 4 Ultimate. Isabelle also appears as part of Nintendo's amiibo line of toys-to-life figures. She has two figures from the Animal Crossing line, one from the Smash Bros. line, and five Animal Crossing amiibo cards.

== Other media and merchandise ==
The official Animal Crossing Twitter account is designed to appear as if it is Isabelle's, though from after the release of Animal Crossing: New Horizons, until July 2020, it was made to appear as though it were run by Tom Nook. Two Animal Crossing-brand Isabelle amiibo, each wearing a different outfit, were produced in conjunction with the release of Animal Crossing: amiibo Festival. A Super Smash Bros. amiibo based on her appearance in Super Smash Bros. Ultimate was announced for 2019. The Isabelle amiibo sold out immediately, which caused writer Chris Carter surprise due to otherwise low sales of Animal Crossing amiibo.

Swappable faceplates featuring Isabelle were made for the New Nintendo 3DS. A Nendoroid figurine of Isabelle was released by Good Smile. In 2016, a crossover promotion between Sanrio and Animal Crossing led to a 3DS menu theme depicting Hello Kitty and Isabelle in a truck. Isabelle appeared in a one-off gag manga in the magazine CoroCoro. Multiple Line digital stickers featuring Isabelle were released on the app.

== Critical reception ==
Isabelle has received generally positive reception since her debut, to the point that she has become the mascot of the Animal Crossing series. She was ranked as one of the best video game characters of the 2010s by Polygon staff; writer Nicole Carpenter called her a "pure, helpful pal" and a "very real icon." Writer Amy Valens explains that her popularity was due to her being "wholesome, positive, and adorable." Writer Nadia Oxford praised her for her intelligence and selflessness, stating that she is "guaranteed to turn your heart into a crimson puddle of pulsating goo." She also noted that all Nintendo has to do to get her to go back to playing New Leaf is for them to "release a sketch of Isabelle the shih tzu sitting forlornly at her cobweb-covered desk, a cup of coffee turning to ice by her elbow." Kotaku's Patricia Hernandez called Isabelle adorable and her "beloved," while expressing sadness at how difficult it was to obtain her amiibo card. Nadia Oxford of USGamer has named Isabelle as her "best new Nintendo character of the past decade", stating that "We've acknowledged and recalled so many great characters in this list, but Isabelle's universal appeal can't be denied". TheGamer also included Isabelle on their "Iconic Video Game Characters", stating that "Canonically the Shih Tzu breed, Isabelle quickly won over every player's heart with her officious nature and killer style."

GamesRadar's Henry Gilbert called her his favorite resident in Animal Crossing due to her cute appearance and reliability. Writer Brittany Vincent called Isabelle one of the most adorable Animal Crossing characters. Writer Jaime Carrillo called her the best helper in video games. Author Ashley Brown discussed Animal Crossing's systems where characters in the game are designed to be aware of the passage of time. She discussed Isabelle's dialogue in particular, where she will become flustered if the player chooses to try and delete the town. She brings up the residents and the town's history, which Brown says is a novel concept but one that may cause distress.

Isabelle has been a popular suggestion for Super Smash Bros. Ultimate among fans. Electronic Gaming Monthly writer Mollie L. Patterson praised her inclusion in Mario Kart 8, calling her adorable and stating her infatuation with the character. Nadia Oxford considered Isabelle as part of one of the best downloadable content packs in 2015, calling her adorable. Writer Gita Jackson called Isabelle her "precious angel" and that Isabelle appearing in Super Smash Bros. Ultimate constituted a birthday gift to her. Game Informer's Jeff Cork noted that Isabelle was a particular favorite for him among Ultimate's newcomers. Writer Jeremy Parish ranked Isabelle as his 11th best character in Super Smash Bros. Ultimate. He called her the "most lovable, loyal, hard-working character" Nintendo has. She is also his favorite character in Mario Kart 8 Deluxe. Paste magazine writer Holly Green ranked her as her least favorite of the newcomers in Ultimate, noting her dislike of some of her moves while praising her Fishing Rod attack. Fellow Paste writer Natalie Flores called her the cutest character in Super Smash Bros. IGN's Tom Marks called her "fantastic" and "charming," but lamented her as being similar to Villager. Jeremy Parish of Polygon ranked 73 fighters from Super Smash Bros. Ultimate "from garbage to glorious", listing Isabelle as 11th and claiming the character as "The most lovable, loyal, hard-working character in the Nintendo pantheon, Isabelle can't be defeated." Gavin Jasper of Den of Geek ranked Isabelle as 41st of Super Smash Bros. Ultimate characters, and calling her as adorable dog version of Leslie Knope. In 2019, 15-year-old female player "Bocchi" was noted for pulling off an upset victory with Isabelle, a low-tier character, over top-ranking player "Ally" using top-tier character Solid Snake during a Super Smash Bros. Ultimate tournament.

When Animal Crossing: New Horizons was delayed and ultimately released on the same day as Doom Eternal, fans of both games began creating and sharing fan art depicting Isabelle and Doomguy together as friends, which eventually trended on social media in 2020. Commentators responded positively towards the fan-made pairing, including acknowledgments from Aya Kyogoku, director of New Horizons, as well as Doom franchise owners Bethesda. The Isabelle and Doomguy friendship pairing has also been subject to other forms of fan labor, including fan videos and cosplay, also including Metroid character Samus Aran. In October 2021, after the addition of Doomguy as a Mii Fighter costume in Super Smash Bros. Ultimate, together with Isabelle on the roster, the final update of the game was dubbed "friendship" and "love story" by video game publications.
