= K.K. Slider =

Fictional character from the Animal Crossing franchise

- Animal Crossing character
- K.K. Slider as featured in promotional art for Animal Crossing: New Horizons
- First appearance: Dōbutsu no Mori (2001)
- Voiced by: Kazumi Totaka; Shun Oguri (Dōbutsu no Mori)

In-universe information
- Species: Dog

Totakeke (Japanese: とたけけ, Hepburn: Totakeke), more commonly known as K.K. Slider or K.K., is a character within the Animal Crossing franchise. One of the franchise's most popular characters, he debuted in the title Animal Crossing, and has appeared in every installment since. K.K.'s main role is as a folk rock (according to the game) musician who performs to the townsfolk, through live performances and purchasable in-game albums. He is based on Nintendo video game voice actor and composer Kazumi Totaka – his Japanese nickname "Totakeke" being a contraction of "Totaka K." – and has been said to be an animal caricature of Totaka.

K.K. Slider has also appeared outside of Animal Crossing several times, such as a costume for the player's Mii fighter in the crossover fighting games Super Smash Bros. for Nintendo 3DS and Wii U and Super Smash Bros. Ultimate.

== Concept and creation ==
K.K. Slider was created for the 2001 video game Doubutsu no Mori for the Nintendo 64, later released on the GameCube as Animal Crossing. K.K. Slider is based on the composer Kazumi Totaka. His music was composed by various members of the compositional staff across the series; some songs were composed because some members were skilled in a specific genre, while others were composed so they could challenge themselves.

== Appearances ==
K.K. Slider was first introduced in the franchise's debut title Doubutsu no Mori for the Nintendo 64, later released on GameCube as Animal Crossing . His role within the game is as a guitarist who performs songs for the player and townsfolk only at a certain time and day each week and, once finished, gives the player a virtual copy of the song that can be played on a radio in their home. This role remains virtually the same throughout every main series Animal Crossing title with minor changes, up until Animal Crossing: New Leaf, in which he also takes the role of a DJ under the pseudonym DJ KK. He also appears in Animal Crossing: Happy Home Designer, Amiibo Festival, Pocket Camp, and New Horizons. In New Horizons, he appears after the player's island has a three-star rating. Four new K.K. songs were added in New Horizons, with 12 additional songs being added in the game's 2.0 update. In the Happy Home Paradise DLC, DJ KK will appear on the main archipelago once the player has constructed thirty homes and designed all five facilities. A concert related to his appearance in the DLC was held in October 2022. K.K. Slider has also received a costume that can be worn by Mii Fighters in the crossover fighting games Super Smash Bros. for Nintendo 3DS and Wii U and Super Smash Bros. Ultimate, as well as his own amiibo.

He appears in the 2006 film Dōbutsu no Mori. In October 2019, K.K. Slider – in the form of a hologram – opened for a Splatoon concert that took place during Nintendo Live in Tokyo, Japan.

== Reception ==
K.K. Slider has received generally positive reception, with UGO identifying him as the most famous Animal Crossing character in a 2013 article. K.K. Slider came in first place in a 2019 popularity poll by Nintendo in Japan. Abby Lee Hood of NintendoLife noted him as a breakout character for his music appearing through remixes, social media videos, and TikTok. Kotaku writer Nina Corcoran discussed K.K. Slider's influence, noting that he introduced people to new music genres and that he has inspired multiple people to create covers of his music, as well as covers of other songs in K.K. Slider's style. Polygon described K.K. Slider as a "fan fave". Cameron Faulkner of The Verge considered K.K. Slider his favorite artist of 2020, talking about how much he appreciated him being a "beam of positivity" during 2020, which he considered a difficult year. He felt that the music didn't resonate with him on 3DS, attributing it to the 3DS' smaller speakers, but found it much better on his TV.
