= Kyogoku =

Kyogoku may refer to:

- Kyōgoku, Hokkaidō, a town on the Japanese island of Hokkaidō
- Kyōgoku clan, a Japanese clan
- Aya Kyōgoku, a video game developer currently working at Nintendo
