= Animal Crossing Plaza =

Discontinued social networking service

- Original author: Aya Kyogoku (producer)
- Developer: Nintendo EAD
- Release: JP: August 8, 2013; NA: August 7, 2013; EU: August 7, 2013
- Platform: Wii U
- Type: Simulation

Animal Crossing Plaza was a social networking service developed and published by Nintendo for the Wii U. It was a spin-off of the Animal Crossing series, associated with Animal Crossing: New Leaf for the Nintendo 3DS. The application allowed players to socialize via Miiverse, Nintendo's now-defunct social networking service; players could share images from their New Leaf save file and interact with others, among other features. It was announced and released on August 7, 2013, in Japan and North America and the following day in Europe. The application is no longer actively supported by Nintendo, and was removed from the Nintendo eShop on December 22, 2014.

== Gameplay ==
Various non-player characters populating the plaza

Animal Crossing Plaza was an internationally social networking application for the Wii U, similar to the Wii U's own Wara Wara Plaza. The network was tied to the Miiverse community forum for the Animal Crossing series. With Plaza, players import images from their save file on Animal Crossing: New Leaf for the Nintendo 3DS via SD card. These images could be organized into albums, and QR codes could be made for image sharing. Depicted on-screen was a plaza, populated with various non-player characters from the Animal Crossing series, which the player could interact with. By interacting with certain characters, the player could make posts about them, which other players could see when interacting with that same character. The game also held monthly community polls where players would rank characters based on a specific question, such as who make the best secretary. The game also detailed players with news regarding New Leaf.

== Development ==
Animal Crossing Plaza was announced in a Nintendo Direct by Nintendo CEO Satoru Iwata on August 7, 2013, and was released digitally on the Nintendo eShop that same day. Plaza was planned as a limited-time application, with Nintendo stating in its announcement of the application that it would only be supported through the end of 2014. It received one update the following November, adding additional Miiverse functionality among other quality of life changes.

On December 8, 2014, New Leaf game director Aya Kyogoku released a public statement confirming that it would cease ongoing support for Plaza, as well as its associated Miiverse forum. The application was removed from the Nintendo eShop on December 22, 2014, and the ability to create new posts within the application was removed on December 31, 2014. Plaza remains accessible to users who downloaded the application prior to its discontinuation, though its social features are no longer usable.

== Reception ==
Although critics received the application positively, most questioned and even criticized both its usefulness and lack of functionality. Nintendo World Report's Alex Culafi praised the image import feature, but beyond this feature they expressed a lack of interest in the game beyond being a novelty. Both Culafi and Nintendo Force praised the visuals and its prospect for the looks of a future mainline Animal Crossing game on the Wii U. Stephen Totilio and Mike Fahey of Kotaku questioned the necessity of the application when New Leaf was available instead; however, Mahey jokingly appreciated that it was a "neat, free way to look at animals".

== See also ==
- Amiibo Tap: Nintendo's Greatest Bits
