= Aya Kyogoku =

Japanese game director

- 京極あや
- Born: 1981 or 1982; Osaka, Japan
- Occupations: Video game director and producer
- Employers: Atlus (2000–2003); Nintendo (2003–present)
- Notable work: Animal Crossing
- Title: Manager of Nintendo EPD Production Group No. 5 (2019–present)

Aya Kyogoku (Japanese: 京極あや, Hepburn: Kyōgoku Aya; born c. 1981) is a Japanese video game director and producer. She is the current manager of Nintendo's Entertainment Planning & Development (EPD) Production Group No. 5, which oversees the Animal Crossing and Splatoon franchises. Kyogoku is best known for her work on Animal Crossing, where she has alternately served as a producer, director, and supervisor since 2008.

== Career ==
Kyogoku began her career in 2000 at the video game company Atlus before joining Nintendo in September 2003. While at Atlus, she served as an Assistant Planner for the Dreamcast title deSPIRIA and Assistant Director for the PlayStation 2 title Wizardry: Tale of the Forsaken Land before moving to Nintendo. At Nintendo, Kyogoku worked as a scriptwriter on The Legend of Zelda: Four Swords Adventures and The Legend of Zelda: Twilight Princess, work for which she won a Game Developers Choice Award.

In 2008, she worked as a sequence director on Animal Crossing: City Folk, where she was responsible for script writing and all elements relating to non-player character behavior and dialogue. Kyogoku and Isao Moro jointly served as directors of Animal Crossing: New Leaf, the 2012 sequel to City Folk. Following the mixed critical and commercial performance of City Folk, Kyogoku sought to "get back to the series' roots" in New Leaf. In 2015, Kyogoku produced the Animal Crossing spin-off title Happy Home Designer. In 2019, she was named as Manager of Nintendo Entertainment Planning & Development (EPD) Production Group No. 5, a position previously held by Hisashi Nogami before he was promoted at Deputy General Manager of Nintendo EPD. She directed Animal Crossing: New Horizons, the fifth main series title in the Animal Crossing series, in 2020. Following the extensive critical and commercial success of New Horizons, Kyogoku has received media attention from both video-game and non-video-game media outlets alike, being dubbed “Nintendo’s Rising Star and Secret Weapon.”

Serving as the director of Animal Crossing: New Leaf, Kyogoku became the first woman to direct a video game at Nintendo Entertainment Analysis & Development (EAD). After noting that she was frequently the only woman on development teams, Kyogoku and New Leaf producer Katsuya Eguchi hired a team that was half female; Kyogoku also encouraged all individuals on the development team to contribute ideas for the game, regardless of their role on the project. Kyogoku credits the diversity of the team for New Leaf's critical and commercial success, stating that "when you are trying to create something that will appeal to many types of people, I have experienced how beneficial it is to have diversity on your team" and “it is very exciting to be able to have different types of people on the development team.” When asked for a message to women who would like to work in the game industry during a Nintendo Developer Chat, Kyogoku responded, “if you want to, please join! I’ll be so happy if we can work together.”

Furthermore, Kyogoku has been praised for broadening the series' appeal "beyond the typical teenage-male demographic.” Notably, Animal Crossing: New Horizons expanded visibility and representation through increased character customization options, including skin tone options and gender-neutral hairstyles that the player can switch between freely. Kyogoku explained that these options are "not just about gender," but rather the sentiment that "society is shifting to valuing a lot of people's different identities." She explained further that “we basically wanted to create a game where users didn't really have to think about gender or if they wanted to think about gender, they're also able to."

== Ludography ==
Year	Game	Credit(s)
2000	deSPIRIA	Assistant planner
2001	Wizardry: Tale of the Forsaken Land	Assistant director
2004	The Legend of Zelda: Four Swords Adventures	Scriptwriter
2006	The Legend of Zelda: Twilight Princess	Scriptwriter
2008	Animal Crossing: City Folk	Sequence director
2012	Animal Crossing: New Leaf	Director
2013	Animal Crossing Plaza	Producer
2015	Animal Crossing: Happy Home Designer	Producer
2015	Animal Crossing: amiibo Festival	Director
2016	Animal Crossing: New Leaf - Welcome amiibo	Producer
2017	Animal Crossing: Pocket Camp	Supervisor
2020	Animal Crossing: New Horizons	Director
