= Mr. Resetti =

Fictional character from the Animal Crossing video game series

- Animal Crossing character
- Mr. Resetti from Animal Crossing: New Leaf
- First game: Animal Crossing (2001)
- Created by: Nintendo EAD
- Designed by: Noriko Ikegawa; Yoshihisa Morimoto
- Voiced by: Yūichi Kimura (Dōbutsu no Mori)

In-universe information
- Species: Mole
- Family: Don Resetti (brother)

Mr. Resetti, full name Sonny Resetti (also known in Japan as Mr. Reset (リセットさん, Risetto-san)), is a character from the Animal Crossing series of video games by Nintendo. His first appearance was in the Nintendo 64 game Dōbutsu no Mori, released in Europe and North America on the GameCube as Animal Crossing. Mr. Resetti is a mole whose role in the series is to remind players to save before quitting the game, and to give a lecture if they do not. Mr. Resetti has received mixed critical reception, with critics taking note of both the unique creativity and perceived hostility of his role.

== Development and concept ==
During play testing of Animal Crossing, players would reset the game and turn the system time backwards to make the daily stock at Tom Nook's store change. In order to prevent this, the development team implemented Mr. Resetti, in hopes that players who want to cheat would be deterred due to the long speeches. If a player resets the game enough, Mr. Resetti will make the player type out sentences such as "I am stupid" and "I stink". Contrary to popular belief, Mr. Resetti does not delete the player's saved file if the player keeps resetting the game. Mr. Resetti's English dialogue in Animal Crossing was written by Nintendo Treehouse team member Tim O'Leary, who intended the character to speak with a deep Bronx accent to complement the character's Osaka accent in the original Japanese. He is designed to make the player believe he knows them and is yelling directly at them, and the European Let's Go to the City manual warns that young children may find Mr. Resetti's authoritative tone of voice disturbing. Within the series, Mr. Resetti is treated as the mascot of the seasonal holiday Groundhog Day. In the first game, the villagers gather together to go watch Mr. Resetti, though in later entries of the series the player receives a tiny doll version of the character instead.

== Appearances ==
Mr. Resetti's role in the Animal Crossing series is to advise the player to remember to save before quitting the game. If the game is shut off without saving, Mr. Resetti will appear outside the player's house the next time the player starts the game, and will give a lecture on why saving is important. Those lectures grow longer the more times the player resets. Also, after resetting multiple times, Mr. Resetti will make the player repeat phrases, and will not let them play until they get it right. If the player retaliates against Resetti, he would insult the player back.

In Animal Crossing: New Leaf, Mr. Resetti appears the first time the player turns the 3DS off without saving. However, he explains that the Reset Surveillance Center (the facility Mr. Resetti works for) has been closed down, and that he will not be able to make any more visits. If the player so chooses, the Reset Surveillance Center can be reopened, allowing Mr. Resetti to resume his former role.

Due to the auto-save function on the Nintendo Switch, Mr. Resetti does not return to the same role in Animal Crossing: New Horizons, but is running the new in-game rescue service as the operator. He also appears on the communications error screen. In the game's 2.0 update, he can randomly appear as an NPC in The Roost café. When interacting with him at café, he reveals that he has become a lot more peaceful at his new job although is saddened by the fact he doesn't get the chance to meet new people as much. Resetti also reflects on the act of resetting, believing now that resetting can be a force for good. Since the 3.0 update was released in 2026, he can be seen wandering around the island, offering players to clean it up.

=== Outside Animal Crossing ===
In the Animal Crossing film, Mr. Resetti appears a number of times as a handyman and reminds characters about following the rules of the Animal Village and scolds those who do bad.

Mr. Resetti has made several minor appearances in the Super Smash Bros. series of video games, including as a collectible trophy in all games beginning with Super Smash Bros. Melee, as an assist trophy in Super Smash Bros. Brawl, and as a background character on the Animal Crossing themed stages in Super Smash Bros. for Wii U. In Brawl, his assist trophy summons him onto the stage to yell at the fighters, causing his lengthy text box to obscure a large portion of the screen.

In Mario Kart 8, Mr. Resetti makes an appearance on the Animal Crossing race course included within the game's second downloadable content pack. On this course, he erratically pops up from the ground during the race, forcing players to avoid crashing into him. Additionally, the Mr. Resetti amiibo figurine can be utilised to unlock the Animal Crossing costume for the Miis. In Monster Hunter 4 Ultimate Mr. Resetti is a craftable character as a costume for the player's Palico in-game as part of the June DLC pack.

== Critical reception ==
Mr. Resetti has received mixed reception. Destructoid's Jonathan Holmes called his actions one of the "more creative" examples of fourth wall breaking alongside Metal Gear Solid's Psycho Mantis. Wired's Chris Kohler featured him at number six in a list of the "10 meanest tricks videogames ever played on us." He cited tactics such as pretending to reset the game during one of his lectures. UGO.com called Mr. Resetti an irritant, but ranked him the sixth best Animal Crossing character, stating that while they do not love him outright, his outbursts are a part of the game's charm. Joystiq editor Chris Greenhough stated "Animal Crossing games would be a lot less awesome without Mr. Resetti," referencing the way he "teaches his lessons through tough love." Kotaku editor Luke Plunkett stated that "Resetti may be just about the best thing about Animal Crossing," and said that "his furious tirades are, after all, both entertaining and informative." Mr. Resetti was named as the 17th best Nintendo character of all time by GameDaily, saying "he's helpful, while at the same time completely annoying". In 2010, GamesTM listed him among the greatest game characters, commenting that he "may be one of the most annoying characters in gaming" but "Mr. Resetti is so meticulously designed with the express purpose of annoying that it's hard not to respect the thought that went into him."

The development team found that Mr. Resetti caused young children to be scared by him to the point of crying. As a result, they made it optional whether players encountered him in New Leaf. Destructoid's Jonathan Holmes did not agree with the decision to make him optional as he felt that the game is "better when it can make you feel awful." Jamie Madigan in a Gamasutra article discussed the use of the word "cheater" by Mr. Resetti and how the label can be used to shame people away from breaking rules. GamesRadar's Ryan Taljonick featured Mr. Resetti on his list of gaming's most "hate-filled characters." IGN's Patrick Kolan felt that despite the quality of his rants, they felt "vanilla" and didn't surprise anyone anymore. Destructoid's Anthony Burch wrote an article that explains why Mr. Resetti was the "most heroic videogame character ever created" and suggested that he is "the only character in the Animal Crossing world whose sole job is to protect the entire universe from paradoxical destruction."
