= Animal Crossing: Happy Home Designer =

2015 video game

- US box art
- Developer: Nintendo EAD (Note: with assistance from Monolith Soft)
- Publisher: Nintendo
- Director: Isao Moro
- Producers: Hisashi Nogami; Aya Kyogoku
- Programmer: Gentaro Takaki
- Artist: Akiko Hirono
- Writers: Makoto Wada; Mitsuhiro Takano; Kunio Watanabe
- Composer: Kazumi Totaka
- Series: Animal Crossing
- Platform: Nintendo 3DS
- Release: JP: July 30, 2015; NA: September 25, 2015; EU: October 2, 2015; AU: October 3, 2015
- Genre: Sandbox
- Mode: Single-player

Animal Crossing: Happy Home Designer is a 2015 sandbox video game developed and published by Nintendo for the Nintendo 3DS. The game was released in Japan in July 2015, in North America in September 2015, and in Europe and Australia in October 2015. The game is a spin-off of the Animal Crossing series where the player designs homes for various anthropomorphic animal characters.

Satoru Iwata served as Executive Producer for Nintendo after his death on July 11, 2015, making this his last and final videogame project throughout his career, and Received some additional credit in various videogames on some categories of the same tribute. Happy Home Designer received mixed reviews from critics upon release; critics praised the creative freedom and improved design controls, but criticised the lack of challenge and unrewarding gameplay loop. Many also felt the game should have been downloadable content (DLC) for Animal Crossing: New Leaf instead of a standalone release. The game sold 3.04 million copies worldwide as of March 2016 and a sequel, Happy Home Paradise, was released as DLC for Animal Crossing: New Horizons on November 5, 2021.

== Gameplay ==
A screenshot of the player working on one of the villager's houses

Animal Crossing: Happy Home Designer downplays the wider community simulation mechanics of the main Animal Crossing series in favor of focusing on house designing; players work as an employee of Nook's Homes, designing homes for other animal villagers based around their suggestions. As players progress, they will unlock additional furniture elements they can incorporate into their designs. Players can also visit the homes they have created.

The game interacts with New Leaf, primarily by allowing the player to unlock exclusive furniture through the Nookling Junction kiosk.

The game integrates with Animal Crossing Amiibo cards; scanning cards allows their respective character to visit a home that a player had designed, and allows players to design homes for other major characters such as K.K. Slider and Tom Nook.

== Development ==
Animal Crossing series producer Aya Kyogoku explained that Happy Home Designer was inspired by the internal process of designing homes for the animal villagers in the main Animal Crossing games, stating that "We had to think about, what kind of things would this animal like? What kind of life do they lead? Trying to figure out what they'd want was very fun, and we tried to think of a way we could get this kind of experience to players as well." Players are not tied to a specific budget when designing homes; while the concept was considered, the development team believed that such a limit placed too much of a burden on the player's creativity.

amiibo were also an influence on Happy Home Designer and a sister game, Animal Crossing: Amiibo Festival, as the development team thought that Animal Crossing amiibo would be "cute", and brainstormed new gameplay concepts for the franchise that incorporated them. The two games also have integration with each other; houses designed in Happy Home Designer can appear in-game within amiibo Festival. Eight series character amiibo were planned for release with amiibo Festival. Upon their announcement, some expressed concerns with the series moving in a different gameplay direction; however Kyogoku noted that it and amiibo Festival were spin-offs, and do not necessarily represent where the mainline series would go in the future.

On October 15, 2021, during an Animal Crossing Nintendo direct, it was announced that paid DLC for Animal Crossing: New Horizons, called Happy Home Paradise, would be released on November 5, 2021. Happy Home Paradise takes heavy inspiration from Happy Home Designer (acting as a sequel of sorts) and follows the player making vacation homes for several villagers, as well as establishments such as a school and restaurant. Lottie returns and two new characters are introduced. The player can use wallpaper on an individual wall as opposed to only all four, have villagers live with each other, among many other new features.

== Reception ==
Reception

Aggregate scores
Aggregator	Score
Metacritic	66/100
OpenCritic	16% recommend

Review scores
Publication	Score
Game Informer	5/10
GameSpot	5/10
GamesRadar+	4/5
IGN	8/10
Nintendo Life	7/10

The game holds aggregate scores of 66.15% on GameRanking and 66/100 at Metacritic, indicating "mixed or average reviews". Fellow review aggregator OpenCritic assessed that the game received weak approval, being recommended by only 16% of critics. IGN's Kallie Plagge praised the game for its "freedom to be creative", but noted that the game sometimes felt unrewarding. Similarly, Nintendo Life felt that the "sheer volume of content was staggering", but was critical of the "lack of any real challenge".

Game Informer's Jeff Cork gave the game a 5 out of 10, saying that it is "a deep dive into Animal Crossing’s ordinarily shallow home-design pool, without the town elements that make the series such a success". GameSpot similarly awarded it a score of 5 out of 10, saying "With what's in the game, Happy Home Designer would have been amazing DLC for New Leaf: it revamps the previous game's clunky design controls, and the glut of new items would give even hardcore fans a reason to revisit their likely neglected village. But as a standalone experience, no matter how many happy homes I design, the town just feels barren."

=== Sales ===
During the game's debut week in Japan, it was the best selling video game in the region, with 522,556 copies sold. As of March 2016, total Japanese sales have surpassed 1.48 million copies, total worldwide sales are at 3.04 million copies.
