= Gekijōban Dōbutsu no Mori =

2006 film

- Theatrical release poster
- Directed by: Jōji Shimura
- Based on: Animal Crossing by Nintendo
- Starring: Yui Horie; Misato Fukuen; Fumiko Orikasa; Yū Kobayashi; Naoki Tatsuta; Kenichi Ogata; Shun Oguri; Yūichi Kimura
- Cinematography: Kōji Yamakoshi
- Edited by: Toshio Henmi
- Music by: Kazumi Totaka (themes); Tomoki Hasegawa (arrangements)
- Production companies: OLM, Inc. Nintendo Co., Ltd.
- Distributed by: Toho
- Release date: December 16, 2006 (Japan)
- Running time: 87 minutes
- Country: Japan
- Language: Japanese
- Box office: ¥1.7 billion ($16.2 million)

Gekijōban Dōbutsu no Mori (Note: Japanese: 劇場版 どうぶつの森, Hepburn: Gekijōban Dōbutsu no Mori; lit. "Animal Forest: The Movie") is a 2006 Japanese animated film directed by Jōji Shimura and based on the Animal Crossing video game series. It was produced by Nintendo, OLM, Inc. and VAP and distributed by Toho. The film opened in theaters in Japan on December 16, 2006, where it went on to earn ¥1.7 billion (approximately $16.7 million) at the box office.

The film retains the theme of the video games, and centers on an 11-year-old girl named Ai who moves into a village populated with animals where she works to make new friends and find her own dreams. Gekijōban Dōbutsu no Mori was not released outside Japan, with Nintendo of America stating in 2007 that they had no plans for an English release.

== Plot ==
The film opens with Ai, an 11-year-old girl, moving into the Animal Village during the spring. After being put to work by Tanukichi to deliver goods, Ai befriends four of the village's residents: Bouquet, Sally, Albert, and a human boy named Yū, participating in several activities. Ai begins to find a series of anonymous messages in bottles that state that a miracle will occur during the upcoming Winter Festival if pine trees are planted in specific points of the village. Ai complies with the messages and begins planting the trees, half-believing that the messages may have been placed by aliens.

During autumn, Bouquet scolds Ai for not attending Sally's farewell party, which comes as a surprise. Ai becomes heartbroken, learning that Sally has moved away to pursue a career in fashion design. Ai goes to the museum café, and ends up crying when K.K. Bossa plays, as the song reminds her of Sally. Bianca scolds Ai, and tells her that she should be happy as a friend for Sally; Ai responds that she is happy for Sally, but is sad that Sally never told her she was moving, and leaves the café. Sally sends a letter of apology to Ai, explaining that a goodbye would have been too upsetting, and encourages her to embark on her own personal journey. Bouquet apologizes to Ai for her harsh reaction.

Winter comes, and all the pine trees that Ai has planted have fully grown and are decorated with Christmas lights. A spaceship crash-lands in the middle of the forest, and Johnny, a seagull, emerges. Johnny, who had planted the bottles in order to make an entrance dressed as an alien, asks the villagers to help locate some of the pieces that broke off his ship during the descent. Ai, Bouquet, Yū, and Albert head towards a cave, where Yū claims to have seen one of the pieces fall. The entrance is blocked up by a large boulder from a recent event. The team tries to move the boulder, but it proves too heavy for them to move. Sally then appears and helps unseal the cave.

The five retrieve the missing piece and return to Johnny, who they discover had already obtained them all. The missing piece turns out to be an injured UFO, one of a larger group that was attracted to the village due to the pattern formed by Ai's lit-up pine trees. The injured UFO reunites with its group, and as they depart, create a constellation in the night sky resembling Ai. Ai then wins the Winter Festival contest for the best decoration, leaving her feeling for the first time as a true member of the village.

== Cast ==
- Yui Horie as Ai, a human girl who moves to the village
- Misato Fukuen as Bouquet, (Note: "Rosie" in English-language releases of the series.) a cat who befriends Ai
- Fumiko Orikasa as Sally, (Note: "Margie" in English-language releases of the series.) an elephant who befriends Ai
- Yū Kobayashi as Yū, a human boy who lives in a neighboring village
- Takatoshi Kaneko as Albert, (Note: "Alfonso" in English-language releases of the series.) an alligator who is friends with Yū
- Masaki Terasoma as Apollo, an eagle whom Bianca seems to admire
- Yurika Hino as Bianca, (Note: "Whitney" in English-language releases of the series.) a wolf implied to have been in a relationship with Apollo
- Yasuhiro Takato as Saruo, (Note: "Champ" in English-language releases of the series.) a monkey who enjoys weight training
- Yūji Ueda as Sakurajima, (Note: "Cyrano" in English-language releases of the series.) an anteater skilled at chanson
- Kazuya Tatekabe as Alan, (Note: "Cesar" in English-language releases of the series.) a gorilla skilled in enka
- Hisao Egawa as Daruman, (Note: "Hopper" in English-language releases of the series.) a rockhopper penguin frequently seen fishing
- Naoki Tatsuta as Tanukichi, (Note: "Tom Nook" in English-language releases of the series.) a tanuki who owns a shop in the village
- Kenichi Ogata as Kotobuki, (Note: "Tortimer" in English-language releases of the series.) an elderly tortoise and mayor of the village
- Akio Suyama as Pelio, (Note: "Pete" in English-language releases of the series.) a pelican mailman
- Otoha as Peliko, (Note: "Pelly" in English-language releases of the series.) a kind pelican who works at the post office
- Yūko Mizutani as Pelimi, (Note: "Phyllis" in English-language releases of the series.) a rude pelican who works at the post office
- Kappei Yamaguchi as Fūta, (Note: "Blathers" in English-language releases of the series.) an owl who operates the village museum
- Mika Kanai as Fūko, (Note: "Celeste" in English-language releases of the series.) an owl who operates the museum observatory
- Takaya Hashi as Master, (Note: "Brewster" in English-language releases of the series.) a pigeon who operates the museum kissaten
- Shun Oguri as Totakeke, (Note: "K.K. Slider" in English-language releases of the series.) a dog street musician. His name and appearance are modeled after musician Kazumi Totaka.
- Yūichi Kimura as Mr. Reset, (Note: "Mr. Resetti" in English-language releases of the series.) a mole in charge of the illumination in the village.
- Junpei Takiguchi as Seiichi, (Note: "Wendell" in English-language releases of the series.) a walrus painter
- Mari Adachi as Kinuyo, (Note: "Mable" in English-language releases of the series.) a hedgehog who operates the village tailor with her sister Asami
- Saori Hattori as Asami, (Note: "Sable" in English-language releases of the series.) a hedgehog who operates the village tailor with her sister Kinuyo
- Tetsuo Sakaguchi as Tsunekichi, (Note: "Redd" in English-language releases of the series.) a kitsune who operates a black market
- Takashi Miike as Rakosuke, (Note: "Pascal" in English-language releases of the series.) a sea otter philosopher
- Wataru Takagi as Johnny, (Note: "Gulliver" in English-language releases of the series.) a common gull astronaut who flies around the village in a UFO
- Mitsuo Iwata as Kappei, (Note: "Kapp'n" in English-language releases of the series.) a kappa who operates a taxicab

Other characters, such as Shishō (Dr. Shrunk), Mr. Honma (Lyle), Maiko (Katie) and her mother (Kaitlin), and Roland (Saharah), make non-speaking appearances.

== Production ==
Gekijōban Dōbutsu no Mori was first announced in a May 2006 issue of the online Japanese magazine Hochi Shimbun, with a theatrical release date set for the following December. The movie entered production due to the success of Animal Crossing: Wild World, released for the Nintendo DS the previous year, which had shipped over 3 million copies in Japan alone. Jōji Shimura was attached to direct, having previously worked on manga-to-film adaptations such Shin Angyo Onshi and Master Keaton. Some of the Animal Crossing series staff assisted with production, and worked to give the movie the same wide audience appeal as the video games themselves.

Those who ordered advance tickets before the film's debut were eligible to receive vouchers which could be redeemed for hard-to-obtain gold tools in Animal Crossing: Wild World. In October 2007, Nintendo of America made a statement that they had "no plans" to bring the film to North America.

=== Music ===
Music for Gekijōban Dōbutsu no Mori was contributed by Animal Crossing series composer Kazumi Totaka and arranged by Tomoki Hasegawa, with the film featuring numerous themes from the games. The film's official theme song is "Mori e Ikō" (森へ行こう, Let's Go to the Forest) by Taeko Ohnuki, which plays over the end credits. An official soundtrack album was released in Japan on December 13, 2006, by VAP containing 46 tracks from the movie along with five bonus songs from Animal Crossing: Wild World.

== Release ==
=== Box office ===
Gekijōban Dōbutsu no Mori was released theatrically in Japan on 16 December 2006 where it was distributed by Toho. It debuted in Japanese theaters as the third highest-grossing Japan-only film of its opening weekend behind Letters from Iwo Jima and Eragon, earning approximately ¥246 million ($2,085,729). By the end of 2006, the movie had a total revenue of ¥1.526 billion ($12,915,432), becoming the 30th highest-grossing film that year in the region. The film had lifetime earnings of ¥1.7 billion ($16,216,731) by the end of its theatrical run in 2007, making it the 17th highest-grossing film of that year when combining it with its December 2006 box office total.

=== Home media ===
Gekijōban Dōbutsu no Mori was released on region 2 DVD in Japan on July 25, 2007, by VAP. First-print copies also included an Animal Crossing-themed carrying pouch.
