= Animal Crossing: New Leaf =

2012 video game

- Packaging artwork for all territories
- Developer: Nintendo EAD (Note: Monolith Soft assisted with development.)
- Publisher: Nintendo
- Directors: Isao Moro; Aya Kyogoku
- Producer: Katsuya Eguchi
- Designers: Koji Takahashi; Ryuji Kobayashi; Akito Osanai
- Programmer: Gentaro Takaki
- Artist: Ryuji Kobayashi
- Writer: Makoto Wada
- Composers: Manaka Kataoka; Atsuko Asahi; Kazumi Totaka
- Series: Animal Crossing
- Platform: Nintendo 3DS
- Release: New Leaf: JP: November 8, 2012; KOR: February 7, 2013; NA: June 9, 2013; EU: June 14, 2013; AU: June 15, 2013; New Leaf - Welcome amiibo: JP: November 23, 2016; AU: November 24, 2016; EU: November 25, 2016; NA: December 8, 2016
- Genre: Social simulation
- Modes: Single-player, multiplayer

Animal Crossing: New Leaf (Note: Known in Japan as Animal Forest: Jump Out (Japanese: とびだせ どうぶつの森(もり), Hepburn: Tobidase Dо̄ubutsu no Mori)) is a social simulation game developed and published by Nintendo for the Nintendo 3DS. The game was first released in 2012 in Japan and later worldwide in 2013, it is the fourth main game in the Animal Crossing series. The player controls a human character who takes on the role of mayor in a town populated with anthropomorphic animals.

The player has the ability to do activities such as bug catching, fishing, and befriending villagers. While retaining gameplay from older titles, Animal Crossing: New Leaf marks a change in the series, as the player becomes the mayor of the town, granting additional abilities such as to enact ordinances and start public works projects. With the help of the townsfolk and a secretary named Isabelle, it is now the player's job to make the town a better place to live.

The game received critical acclaim, with many citing the improvements upon prior entries in the series. Although the title was re-released under the Nintendo Selects banner in North America and as Happy Price Selection in Japan, an updated version with amiibo support and new features was released for free on the Nintendo eShop in November 2016 for owners of the original version. A retail version of the update was released as Animal Crossing: New Leaf - Welcome amiibo (Note: Tobidase Dōbutsu no Mori amiibo Purasu (Japanese: とびだせ どうぶつの森 amiibo+)) in late 2016. It was followed by Animal Crossing: New Horizons for the Nintendo Switch in 2020.

== Gameplay ==
A player as town mayor with their assistant Isabelle

As in the previous installments of the Animal Crossing series, players take control of a villager who is moving into a new town. Upon arrival, the player is mistaken for the new town mayor and is given that position instead of being a standard resident. Like the previous games in the series, the game enables the player to explore their town, talk with other residents, and participate in various activities such as fishing and bug catching. Doing various activities or selling various items earns the player Bells, the game's currency, which they can use to purchase various items such as furniture or clothes, or pay loans used to renovate their house. The game is played in real-time, utilizing the Nintendo 3DS system's internal clock, with aspects such as shop opening times, species of wildlife and special events varying depending on the time of day and season.

Animal Crossing: New Leaf introduces many features to the series. Players begin the game living in a tent before their house, which eventually can be upgraded and expanded, is built. Customization, a major part of the series has been enhanced, particularly in the player's ability to modify their character's appearance and decorate their house. The character's pants can be modified in addition to their shirt, shoes, hat, and accessory; and the ability to hang furniture on walls has been added. Features previously only found in the Japanese Dōbutsu no Mori e+ for the GameCube, such as benches and lamp posts, have returned. Another addition is the ability to swim in the ocean that borders the town using a swimsuit. Players were once able to visit each other's towns using the Nintendo Network before it permanently lost support and service on April 8, 2024. Until that time, players were also able to add one another to a friends list that allowed them to exchange messages with one another, while up to four players at a time were able to travel to the tropical Tortimer Island to take part in various minigames that award medals. Players are able to take snapshots at almost any time, which are saved to the Nintendo 3DS Camera and can be shared.

The game features a new mechanic that makes the player the town mayor, allowing them to have more customization of their town than in previous games. While taking part in mayoral duties is not obligatory to play the game, being the head of town imparts two gameplay features new to the series: Public Works Projects and Ordinances. Public Works Projects allow players to collect funds from townsfolk and other visiting players to construct new objects such as bridges, fountains, and light poles, as well as add new facilities such as campsites and cafés. Ordinances gives players the ability to customize the way their town functions by passing laws, such as making the town wealthier, encouraging citizens to plant more flowers, or making the shops open earlier or later. Only the first person to register a save file on each copy of the game will be able to become mayor.

New Leaf makes various uses of the Nintendo 3DS's features, some of which are made available as time passes. Players can visit other players' towns via local play or online with up to four friends (an optional club membership on Tortimer Island allows players to explore the island with other online players). A Dream Suite feature allows players to download dream versions of other people's towns to freely explore. The Happy Home Showcase allows players to view the homes of other players encountered on StreetPass, as well as order some of the furniture their house contains. A sewing machine in the Able Sisters shop allows players to create QR codes of their designs, which other players can download using the Nintendo 3DS's camera. Play Coins can be used to buy fortune cookies, which in turn can be exchanged for special prizes, such as rare items based on other Nintendo franchises.

== Characters ==
The game features two new animal types for regular villagers: hamsters and deer, as well as two new non-player character personalities: "smug" and "uchi", the latter described as a "big sister type". New special characters include a dog named Isabelle, who acts as the player's personal assistant, her twin brother Digby who runs the Happy Home Showcase where players can view model home layouts, a sloth named Leif who runs a gardening center, and a pair of alpacas named Reese and Cyrus, who run a store called "Re-Tail", a recycling shop where players can sell unwanted items or customize furniture for their house. Tom Nook returns as a real-estate agent instead of a shopkeeper, his former business run by his nephews Timmy and Tommy. The skunk Kicks and hedgehog Labelle from Animal Crossing: City Folk are featured as shoe and accessory salespersons respectively, while K.K. Slider has a position as a DJ at a nightclub called "Club LOL". The building is run by an axolotl named Dr. Shrunk, who is a stand-up comedian. Tortimer, the former mayor of the town, runs an island that can be visited by using the boat at the dock the day after the first home loan is paid off.

== Development ==
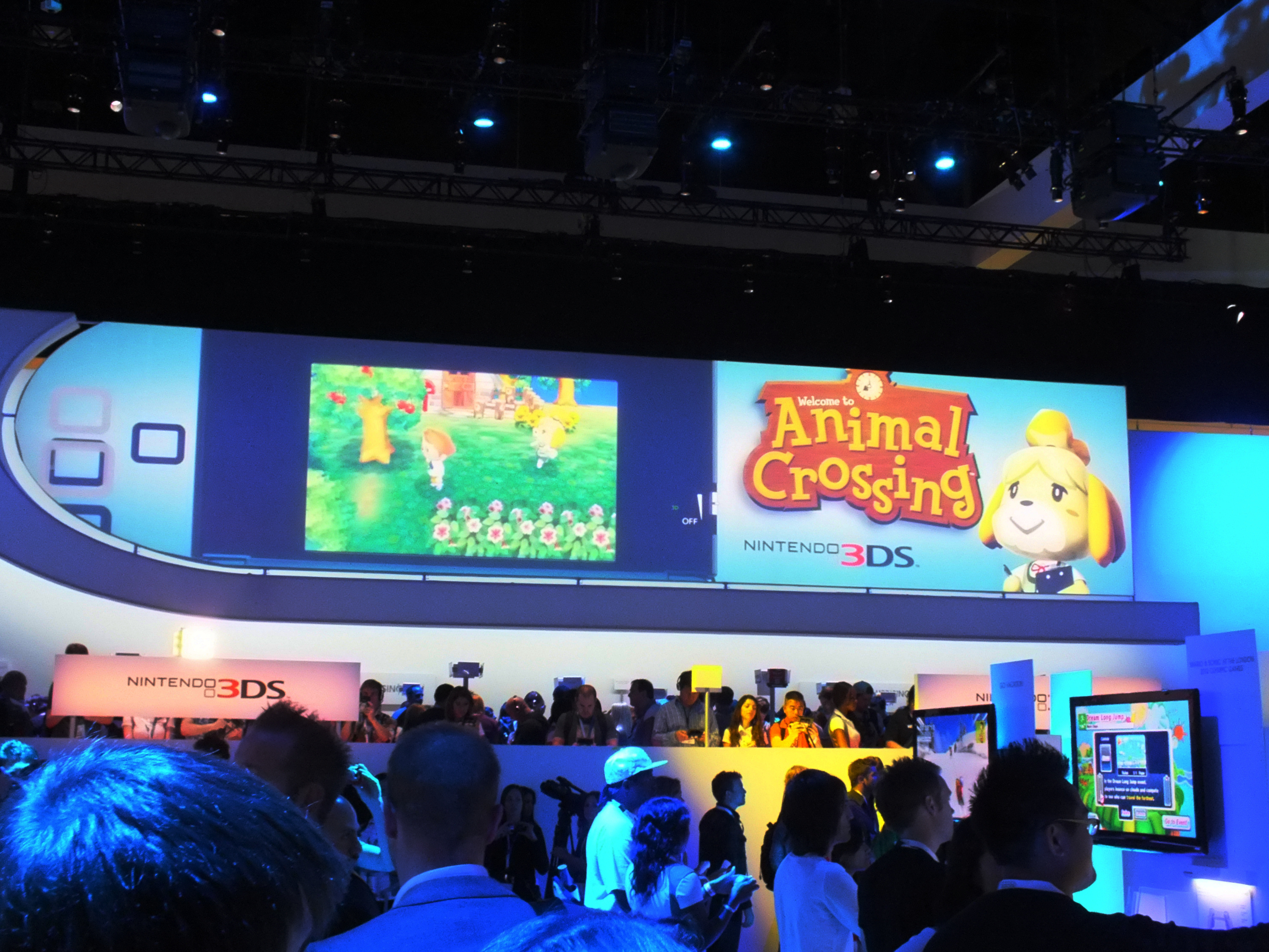
Animal Crossing: New Leaf at E3 2011

Animal Crossing: New Leaf was announced at E3 2010 as the first title in the series for the Nintendo 3DS. It later appeared at the 2011 Nintendo World expo, and again at E3 2011 during a short presentation where a release date was originally announced for later that year in Japan. Nintendo later pushed back the release to sometime in 2012 before the end of the fiscal year in March, and eventually finalized a Japanese release to Q3 of that year during a Nintendo Direct broadcast. Its English title was revealed in October 2012, along with a tentative release date in the west for early 2013. In February 2013, New Leaf's definite release date was announced for the following June in North America, Europe, and Australia.

The game was produced by Katsuya Eguchi and directed by the two-person team of Isao Moro and Aya Kyogoku, who had both worked under the previous director of Animal Crossing: City Folk on the Wii. The idea for the player to become mayor did not manifest until about a year into development, which stemmed from the concept of giving the player much more freedom in designing and shaping the way their town grew. Giving players the ability to pass ordinances and laws that involve shops being open earlier or later in the day was included to accommodate more personal schedules and play styles while still keeping the game synced with the passage of time in the real world. The main theme of the game was composed by Manaka Kataoka (formally known as Manaka Tominaga) while she composed the rest of the soundtrack with Atsuko Asahi. Kazumi Totaka was the sound director for the game as he was for the rest of the series. Monolith Soft assisted on development.

Because the game was being designed for a 3D display instead of a flat one like its predecessors, the design team had to pay extra attention to how objects and characters appeared in regard to lighting and shading, and that no obvious flaws could be seen from the different perspective. Design coordinator Koji Takahashi admitted that it was difficult thinking up new animal species to represent townsfolk since they primarily wanted to stick to ones people were familiar with, and had "pretty much used up" the most familiar examples in previous games. Alpacas in particular were chosen due to their recent popularity in the country.

In order to make New Leaf a more personal experience to players around the world, the development team researched customs and holidays from various countries, including collaborating with Nintendo offices around the world, and included them in versions of the game released in those regions. These include variations to in-game events such as New Year's Eve, such as eating New Year noodles in the Japanese version, drinking sparkling cider in the English North American version, and eating a twelve-grape plate at midnight in the Spanish-language North American or European versions.

New Leaf's English translation began in March 2012 by members of Nintendo of America's "Treehouse" localization group, who collaborated with the company's headquarters in Japan on creating in-game events. The North American and European versions contain an extra feature not included in the Japanese release - the ability to download example home layouts in the Happy Home Showcase from Nintendo over the internet using the SpotPass feature in addition to StreetPass, which requires players to physically pass by one another. According to localization manager Reiko Ninomiya, this was added due to the difficulty players in those regions experience with meeting others in public who own the game, explaining that "in Japan Streetpass happens really, really frequently. People take trains. It's a different community culture. Here, you've got people living in remote parts where they don't have an opportunity to pass by people who have the game."

== Promotion and release ==
In October 2012, Nintendo Japan created an official Animal Crossing: New Leaf Twitter account featuring tweets from the character Isabelle that included updates and promotions about the game, with English versions established by Nintendo Europe in April 2013, and Nintendo of America in May 2013. Later that month, Nintendo of America began to produce a series of roundtable video discussions with the English "Treehouse" localisation team providing information on the game's development and translation, which were posted on YouTube as well as the game's Twitter and Facebook pages. Nintendo Japan would partner with the 7-Eleven convenience store chain to offer special company-brand in-game items and furniture such as signs, shirts, and food displays by accessing Wi-Fi hotspots at select store locations across Japan between May and August 2013. Two Animal Crossing-themed clothing items were also made available as downloadable content in the Japanese version of Style Savvy: Trendsetters for the 3DS, featuring designs based on the characters K.K. Slider and Gracie.

Nintendo released an Animal Crossing: New Leaf-themed special edition 3DS XL handheld bundled with a digital copy of the game alongside its standard release in Japan. In April 2013, the bundle was announced for North America and Europe in a Nintendo Direct broadcast, which would also be made available on the same day as the game's release in both regions the following June. The game was made available as a download title on the Nintendo eShop in Japan on the same day as the physical release, with a North American eShop version also accompanying its retail version. A pre-order bonus figurine featuring a model of the town hall with the character Isabelle was also distributed exclusively by EB Games in Australia and Game retailers in Europe.

A select number of American players chosen through Nintendo's Mayor Program were eligible to try the game out through the month of May and in return, chronicled their experiences online. On August 7, 2013, an app titled Animal Crossing Plaza was added to the Wii U, allowing players to communicate with other Animal Crossing players. The feature was available until the end of 2014. In Europe and Australia, a promotion was announced in which if players register their game on Club Nintendo between August and October 2013, they would receive a code that they can give to another 3DS XL owner, allowing them to download a free copy of the game. In September 2016, Nintendo and Sanrio has announced that they will be bringing Hello Kitty to the game in Japan.

A large update known as Welcome amiibo was released on November 2, 2016, adding support for amiibo (including Animal Crossing, The Legend of Zelda, and Splatoon figurines and cards)—which can be used to summon villagers and vendors to a new campsite area. The update also features save data integration with Animal Crossing: Happy Home Designer, and backports the game's touchscreen controls for furnishing.

== Reception ==
Reception

Aggregate scores
Aggregator	Score
GameRankings	86.93%
Metacritic	88/100

Review scores
Publication	Score
Famitsu	39/40
GameSpot	8/10
IGN	9.6/10
Joystiq	4.5/5
Nintendo Life	9/10
Polygon	9/10

Following its announcement at E3 2010, very positive response was given to the game's visuals. Writing for G4TV, Patrick Klepek felt that the game's use of the Nintendo 3DS's stereoscopic 3D effects gave the game world "real, tangible depth", while IGN editor Craig Harris described them as "subtle, but helpful". Both Harris and GameSpot editor Tom McShea praised the level of detail in the game's environment and objects, stating that they exceed that of the game's predecessor, Animal Crossing: City Folk for the Wii console.

The game received "generally positive" reception, according to review aggregator Metacritic. The Japanese version of the game received a 39/40 from Japanese magazine Famitsu, earning the publication's Platinum Award, while the English version received an 8/10 from GameSpot, and a 9.6/10 from IGN.

The game debuted in Japan with sales of just over 800,000 units sold, with 200,000 of them being digital downloads. Animal Crossing: New Leaf became the first 3DS game in Japan to pass two million units sold, doing so in just under two months. By March 2013, 3.86 million copies had been sold. By August 2014, 1.36 million copies had been sold in the United States. As of March 2025, all versions combined had sold 13.07 million copies worldwide, making it one of the best-selling 3DS games. A week following the release of the mobile app Animal Crossing: Pocket Camp in November 2017, sales of New Leaf saw a 214% sales increase in Japan.

== Legacy ==
In the 2014 crossover fighting game Super Smash Bros. for Nintendo 3DS and Wii U, the character Isabelle appears as an Assist Trophy, while Tortimer Island appears as a playable stage in the 3DS version of the game. She became a playable character in 2018's Super Smash Bros. Ultimate. In 2019, Polygon named the game among the decade's best.
