= Tom Nook =

Fictional character from the Animal Crossing franchise

- Animal Crossing character
- Tom Nook as he appears in Animal Crossing: New Horizons
- First game: Animal Crossing (2001)
- Created by: Nintendo Entertainment Analysis and Development
- Designed by: Noriko Ikegawa; Yoshihisa Morimoto
- Voiced by: Naoki Tatsuta (Dōbutsu no Mori)

In-universe information
- Species: Tanuki (Japan); Raccoon (International)

Tom Nook, known in Japan as Tanukichi (たぬきち), is a character in the Animal Crossing series who operates the village store (or the Resident Services building in Animal Crossing: New Horizons). He first appeared in the Nintendo 64 game Dōbutsu no Mori, released in Europe and North America on the GameCube as Animal Crossing. Nook sells a house to the player at the beginning of each title in the series (with Animal Crossing: New Leaf and Animal Crossing: New Horizons being an exception, as Nook sells the player a tent at the start of those games), giving a set mortgage for them to pay, and offering to upgrade it after the mortgage is paid off. He has also made several appearances in the Super Smash Bros. series.

== Concept and design ==
Tom Nook is based on the tanuki, the raccoon dog. Rich Amtower and Reiko Ninomiya, members of Nintendo's Treehouse localization team, described him as "that first boss you ever had", adding that, "despite him being all business and not always having the time for pleasantries, Nook isn't a bad person; because he hired someone new to town. Due to that involving risk, it shows generosity". Ninomiya agreed, and both felt that Nook's perceived greed is diminished by the city's price index compared to that of his shop. Amtower jokingly alludes to an "anti-Nook bias" several times throughout an interview with 1UP.com.

== Appearances ==
Tom Nook first appears in the Nintendo 64 title Dōbutsu no Mori (ported to the GameCube as Animal Crossing in non-Japanese regions) as the town's main shopkeeper, and continues this job in the next two installments. At the beginning of most games in the series, Nook sells the player a house or tent that they cannot afford, and offers the player a mortgage to be repaid in the Town Hall or Post Office. In addition to being the main shop owner, Nook also acts as a tutorial character, requesting the player work in his shop temporarily to repay some of their debt. The chores Nook assigns to the player are meant to help them get used to the controls of the game. After planting flowers, writing letters, and talking to villagers, the tutorial ends, but the player has to pay the remaining amount of their mortgage on their own. Each time a mortgage payment is completed, Nook will offer an upgrade or add-on to the player's house, each time putting the player into greater debt to Nook.

Nook's store also goes through four upgrades and changes throughout the game as the player purchases more items from the store. Eventually his humble "Nook's Cranny" shack-like store with basic tools and necessities will become "Nookington's Department Store"—a large, three story building with a wide variety of items for purchase. It is in this expansion that the player meets his two apprentices, Timmy and Tommy, who run the second floor of the store and eventually take over the shopkeeper role starting in New Leaf.

Nook's role in the series remained virtually unchanged from 2001 until 2012 with the release of Animal Crossing: New Leaf. Instead of being the local shop owner, Nook is now in charge of "Nook's Homes" and instead offers exterior renovations for the player's house. His apprentices, Timmy and Tommy, now run their own shop by themselves.

Nook makes a minor appearance in Pocket Camp with the player being able to purchase him to put in their camp for 250 Leaf Tickets (Only available for purchase 45 days after starting the game). He later appeared as a free log-in gift to promote the release of New Horizons. He also appears on the button to buy leaf tickets.

In New Horizons, Nook, Timmy, and Tommy offer the player an island getaway package, and help them to facilitate the setup and progression of the island; eventually, the player helps Timmy and Tommy to establish the town shop which they again run by themselves. Nook offers the player a new program known as the Nook Mileage program as a secondary form of in-game currency. He can again arrange expansions to the player's house, with the loan amount increasing each time.

Tom Nook has made several minor appearances in the Super Smash Bros. series of video games, appearing as various collectibles in Super Smash Bros. Melee, Super Smash Bros. Brawl and Super Smash Bros. Ultimate, as well as a background character on the Smashville stage, which is based on the Animal Crossing series. Tom Nook's shop music also features in Super Smash Bros. Brawl as part of "Town Hall and Tom Nook's Store". Tom Nook also appears in the Animal Crossing animated film, and has been featured in several promotional items, including plush toys.

== Critical reception ==
Tom Nook has received mixed reception since his appearance in Animal Crossing. IGN listed him as the ninth most-wanted character to appear in Super Smash Bros. Brawl. They describe him as devious, diabolical, and sinister, commenting that while he may not be a good fighter due to being from a video game without any fighting, they would enjoy seeing him get beaten up. Another article by IGN compares a talking baton given to the protagonist of Major Minor's Majestic March to Nook, calling it the second only to Nook in annoyance. GameSpy listed Tom Nook as one of their favourite bosses; editor Brian Altano specified that he passionately loves to hate Nook, stating that while he provides appreciated services to the small village, he keeps his reality grounded in that he lives in Nook's town, not his own. UGO.com ranked him the fifth best Animal Crossing character, stating that while Mr. Resetti was an irritant, Tom Nook was a jerk. They added that they love to hate him, jokingly suggesting that he was a "kingpin". Junkee also offers a fairly negative assessment of Tom Nook's personality, while also pointing out his transformation over different games in the franchise, and arguing that his personal qualities are not as important as the intrinsically exploitative system he represents and benefits from.

Tom Nook has received some positive reception as well. In author Katherine Isbister's book, "Better game characters by design: a psychological approach", she cites Tom Nook as an example of a mentor character, one who indirectly helps players. GamesRadar also listed him as one of the 25 best new characters of the decade, stating that he has earned his place amongst the hearts of gamers and people on the Internet as both a viral meme and a deceptively devious character. In 2012, GamesRadar ranked Tom Nook as the 80th best villain in video games in their 2013 "Top 100", saying although raccoons are "stripy, furry and cute", "Tom Nook can go to Hell." That same year, Complex placed him as the 49th coolest video game villain of all time.

Game-studies scholar Ian Bogost described Nook as central to Animal Crossing's effective depiction of the economics of consumption and debt:

None of the townsfolk ever appear in Tom Nook's shop... In contrast, the player participates in a full consumer regimen; he pays off debt, buys goods, and sells goods. Tom Nook buys goods, which he converts to wealth. ... While the player spends more, Nook makes more. By condensing all of the environment's financial transactions into one flow between the player and Tom Nook, the game proceduralizes the redistribution of wealth in a manner even young children can understand. Tom Nook is a kind of condensation of the corporate bourgeoisie.

Tom Nook has been satirized in several articles, often compared to a mob boss, kingpin or otherwise a bad person. IGN listed him among the top 100 video game villains, suggesting that Tom Nook has a nice face, but the "cold, dead heart of a megalomaniac whose sole desire is to make a quick bell". Fellow IGN editor Patrick Kolan described Nook as the Animal Crossing equivalent of Al Swearengen, a pimp from the 1800s, due to his business sense, as well as both the character's position and disposition. Tom Nook has also been personified as a devious character, as well as a gangster, including an issue of the web comic VG Cats, which depicts him roughing up the player's character for his rent money. He has also appeared in the web comic PvP, in which Tom and Rowan threaten to destroy the player's home for owing 500,000 bells. In a satirical article written by GamesRadar, they suggest that the cast of Animal Crossing, most importantly Tom Nook, were setting the player up into a "furry cult". GameSpy listed Tom Nook as a video game character who would be disliked in real life, stating that he is annoying in the video games, and would be terrifying if he were a landlord in real life. 1UP.com editor Jeremy Parish, in his review of Animal Crossing: Wild World, makes a parody documentary of the in-game world. In it, he suggests that Tom Nook's keen business sense allows him to effectively control the village. In the TV show Robot Chicken, Tom Nook is parodied in the sketch The Raccoon of Wall Street, where he is voiced by Zachary Levi.
