= Animal Crossing (video game) =

2001 video game

- North American GameCube box art
- Developer: Nintendo EAD
- Publisher: Nintendo
- Directors: Katsuya Eguchi; Hisashi Nogami
- Producer: Takashi Tezuka
- Programmers: Yuhiki Otsuki; Masaru Nii
- Artists: Noriko Ikegawa; Yoshihisa Morimoto
- Writers: Makoto Wada; Kenshiro Ueda; Kunio Watanabe
- Composers: Kazumi Totaka; Kenta Nagata; Toru Minegishi; Shinobu Tanaka
- Series: Animal Crossing
- Platforms: Nintendo 64; GameCube; iQue Player
- Release: April 14, 2001: Nintendo 64; JP: April 14, 2001 GameCube; JP: December 14, 2001; NA: September 16, 2002; AU: September 15, 2003; EU: September 24, 2004 e+; JP: June 27, 2003 iQue Player; CHN: June 1, 2006
- Genre: Social simulation
- Modes: Single-player, multiplayer

Animal Crossing, known in Japan as Dōbutsu no Mori, (Note: どうぶつの森; lit. Animal Forest) is a social simulation game developed and published by Nintendo. It was first released in 2001 for the Nintendo 64 in Japan, followed by an enhanced port for the GameCube. The GameCube version was localized for North America, Australia, and Europe between 2002 and 2004. It is the first game in the Animal Crossing series.

Animal Crossing features nonlinear gameplay in which the player takes up residence in a village inhabited by anthropomorphic animals. The goal is to save money to pay off the mortgage on the player's house by collecting and selling natural materials. The player can engage in everyday life in the village, interact with the animals, attend events, and contribute to the village's development. The western localization replaces Japanese holidays and cultural references with Western ones.

Animal Crossing was conceived as a role-playing adventure for the 64DD, with the main action taking place in dungeons. However, development was stalled by the repeated delays of the peripheral. Following the move to the standard cartridge format, co-director Katsuya Eguchi decided to refocus the game as a non-linear life simulator, which would carry the themes of family, friendship, and community and allow several players to develop a virtual town at different times.

Animal Crossing was a critical and commercial success domestically and internationally, attracting many non-traditional gaming audiences. Critics praised the game's unusual but immersive and addictive gameplay, which was devoid of purpose and stressful elements. Criticisms centered on its outdated graphics and simple art style. The game is considered one of the earliest examples of the casual game genre, as well as one of the greatest games of all time.

== Gameplay ==
A screenshot of the overworld, featuring the player's character. The game features graphics from the Nintendo 64 version.

Animal Crossing is a social simulation game, dubbed a "communication game" by Nintendo. It is open-ended, and the player's character can live a separate life with very little set plot or mandatory tasks. Players assume the role of a new resident to the town. The gender and looks of the character depend on answers given to a cat named Rover, whom the player meets on the train the character takes to the town. There are also tasks that players can complete and goals they can achieve. The game is played in real-time, observing days, weeks, months and years using the GameCube's internal clock. Many real-life events and holidays span the year, including Independence Day, Halloween, the Harvest Festival (Thanksgiving), and Toy Day (Christmas). Other activities, such as fishing tournaments and early-morning fitness classes, occur on a regular schedule. When players stop playing, they can talk to their Gyroid, a creature next to their house, to save their progress. If the player turns off the game or resets the GameCube without saving first, what they achieved during the previous unsaved game is lost, but everything else is kept; however a mole named Mr. Resetti appears in front of the player's house the next time they play, to scold them for resetting and forces a drawn out conversation with the player. Rarely, Mr. Resetti's more calm older brother Don will appear instead, advising the player to save their game instead of becoming angry like his brother.

One of the main goals of the game, given to the player during the game's opening cut scenes, is to increase the size of the player's character's house. This house is the repository for furniture and other items acquired during the course of the game. It can be customized in several ways, such as roof colour, furniture, music, wallpaper and flooring. These customisations are judged by the Happy Room Academy (HRA).

Tom Nook, a tanuki (raccoon dog) in the Japanese versions and a raccoon in the American and European versions, runs the local store. At the beginning of the game, he gives the player their first house with a mortgage of 19,800 Bells (the in-game currency). After paying the debt, part of which is done through a part-time job with Nook, the house is expanded, prompting another debt from Nook. The house is expanded several times during the course of the game. Players can sell virtually anything to Nook in exchange for Bells. As the player buys and sells items at Nook's store, it will gradually expand, offering a wider selection of products for purchase. Players can also visit locations such as the Able Sisters' clothing shop, where they can purchase or design new clothes; the Police Station, where they can obtain additional items from the Lost and Found; and the Museum, where they can donate fossils, paintings, fish and insects to put on display.

The village initially contains six villagers, and more villagers move in or out depending on the player's actions. There is a maximum of fifteen villagers living there at a time. All villagers are animals and each has a home that the player can visit. There are many possible interactions between the player and the villagers, including talking, trading items, completing tasks, writing letters, and, in e+, buying medicine for when they get sick. Villagers interact with each other independent of player control.

=== Multiplayer ===
Up to four players can take turns creating their own houses in a single village. They can each affect the village in their own ways, communicate with each other via the town board and mail, and share in the experiences of the village. Multiple players can take turns shipping items to each other via Tom Nook, using a system of codes. Multiplayer NES games are available.

The traveling system allows each player to visit other players' villages. This system requires an additional memory card with the game's data, and three blocks of memory to save travel data. Players can meet new villagers, shop at stores, drop items, and do almost anything else that they can do in their own town. Visitors have reduced privileges and do not receive the same services that they would in their own town. For example, another town's Tom Nook will not travel to paint a roof, which means players cannot buy paint in another town. After visiting another town, one of the villagers may move to the visited town. If the visited town has a full fifteen villagers, this will prompt someone from the visited town to move away. Depending upon how many memory cards a player or their friends own, there can be many other villages to see and different items to find. If a player interacts with a villager who has moved away from their village to the visited village, the villager will remember the player.

=== Game Boy Advance connectivity ===
Game Boy Advance connectivity plays a role in Animal Crossing, using a Nintendo GameCube – Game Boy Advance link cable. Each town has an island that can be accessed by plugging in a Game Boy Advance with a GameCube link cable. A character called Kapp'n ferries the player to the island for free. An exclusive animal roams the island, with whom the player can become friends. The island has an exclusive type of fruit: coconuts. The player can also decorate a small communal beach house and fish at the shores. On leaving, the player can download the island to a GBA and give fruit to the villager, who drops Bells; if the player returns to the island, they can pick up the money that has been dropped. Players can leave the islander tools to use, such as the shovel or net. Downloaded islands can be traded between GBAs, using a Game Boy Advance Link Cable.

The Game Boy Advance can be used when shopping at the Able Sisters. The pattern design tool can be downloaded to a Game Boy Advance, and the player can then upload designs made on a Game Boy Advance to the GameCube. This feature can be accessed by plugging in a Game Boy Advance with a GameCube Game Boy Advance Cable and talking to Mabel in the Able Sisters shop. The game is also compatible with the e-Reader; by visiting the Post Office while connected to the accessory via the Game Boy Advance link cable, players can scan Animal Crossing themed cards to receive new items, town tunes, or pattern designs.

=== Nintendo Entertainment System games ===
Players can collect various Nintendo Entertainment System games in Animal Crossing, which are playable via emulation. All GameCube versions prior to Doubutsu no Mori e+ were packaged with a memory card that automatically gave the player two games upon creating a game file. Others are acquired in various ways, such as gifts from villagers, hidden on the island, or via special codes that were distributed through Nintendo's website. The available NES games differ slightly between each release.

The following NES games are available for play:

Game	N64	GCN (JP)	GCN (WW/JP e+)
Balloon Fight	Yes	Yes	Yes
Baseball	No	Yes	Yes
Clu Clu Land	Yes	Yes	Yes
Clu Clu Land D	No	Yes	Yes
Donkey Kong	Yes	Yes	Yes
Donkey Kong Jr.	No	Yes	Yes
Donkey Kong Jr. Math	Yes	Yes	Yes
Donkey Kong 3	No	Yes	Yes
Excitebike	No	No	Yes
Golf	Yes	Yes	Yes
Gomoku Narabe Renju	No	Yes	No
Mah-Jong	No	Yes	No
Pinball	Yes	Yes	Yes
Punch-Out!!	No	Yes	Yes
Soccer	No	No	Yes
Tennis	Yes	Yes	Yes
Wario's Woods	No	Yes	Yes

Dōbutsu no Mori+ and Animal Crossing feature four additional NES games that are not obtainable in-game through normal means. Ice Climber was available in Dōbutsu no Mori+ to players who used a service provided by Nintendo to transfer their save data from Dōbutsu no Mori. A memory card containing data to unlock Super Mario Bros. in Dōbutsu no Mori+ was offered as a sweepstakes prize in issue #678 of Famitsu magazine. In the North American Animal Crossing, both Ice Climber and Mario Bros. were available through the use of two e-Reader cards. The Legend of Zelda exists in the game's code, but is not normally accessible in-game. These four bonus games can be obtained using a cheat device, but were removed in Dōbutsu no Mori e+.

The Advance Play feature allows players to link a Game Boy Advance to the GameCube and temporarily transfer the NES game to the handheld. This is not compatible with games that were originally produced for the Famicom Disk System, such as Clu Clu Land D and The Legend of Zelda, or are larger than 192 KB, such as Punch-Out!! and Wario's Woods, as they cannot fit into the GBA's RAM. All other games can be played via Advance Play, but multiplayer functionality is not supported and their graphics appear slightly squashed on the GBA's display due to its smaller vertical resolution.

An additional furniture item, resembling a Famicom Disk System in the Japanese versions and an NES in the English version, allows players to emulate other NES games not included within the base release by reading ROMs stored on the player's Controller Pak or memory card. A special Nintendo 64 Controller Pak, containing a ROM of Ice Climber for use in Dōbutsu no Mori, was given away in limited quantities during June 2001 as a sweepstakes prize in magazines such as Famitsu and Nintendo Dream. However, no additional ROMs were ever distributed for the GameCube versions. In 2018, an independent software developer reverse engineered the emulation software to convert ROMs into a compatible format, allowing new NES games to be imported into the Animal Crossing emulator.

== Development and release ==
The game was developed by Nintendo EAD with an inexperienced team led by Katsuya Eguchi, Hisashi Nogami, and Super Mario co-creator Takashi Tezuka, most of whom had regrouped after the release of Yoshi’s Story in 1997. The 64DD peripheral served as an enabling technology platform for the conception and development of the game, with its real-time clock and 64MB floppy disk for writable mass storage. Due to 64DD's extended delays and cancellation, the game's development was moved to the Game Pak cartridge medium—the only Game Pak containing a real-time clock—plus a Controller Pak for saving progress. Kazumi Totaka served as the game's sound director. Kenta Nagata composed background music for the fields, Toru Minegishi for the indoor areas and Shinobu Tanaka for the events. The game was shown at Nintendo Space World 2000 and contained playable versions of Balloon Fight, Ice Climber, Clu Clu Land, and Donkey Kong. It was originally released as Dōbutsu no Mori (lit. "Animal Forest") on the Nintendo 64 in Japan on April 14, 2001. It is the last game Nintendo released for the Nintendo 64, and third to last game released for the system in Japan. The game was ported to the GameCube as Dōbutsu no Mori+, released on December 14, 2001, in Japan, eight months after the original game. This version contains extra features that were originally left out of the Nintendo 64 version, and uses the GameCube's built-in clock. This led to the game's slogan, "the real life game that's playing, even when you're not". Dōbutsu no Mori+ cost ¥7,140 with 92,568 copies sold during its first week in Japan.

When Nintendo began localizing Dōbutsu no Mori+ for release in North America as Animal Crossing, the game underwent an immense translation project, which resulted in much more text than the Japanese version. Not only did thousands of lines of text have to be translated, but translators Nate Bihldorff and Rich Amtower had to create new holidays and items to be relatable outside of Japan. The translation process took six months total, which at the time was Nintendo of America's largest translation project to date. It was released in North America on September 16, 2002, in Australia on September 15, 2003, and in the United Kingdom on September 24, 2004. Nintendo's Japanese leadership was so impressed with the work done by Nintendo of America's Treehouse division that they added the American content back into the Japanese version and released it as Dōbutsu no Mori e+, (Note: どうぶつの森e+; lit. Animal Forest e+) along with more new content. It was released in Japan on June 27, 2003, with 91,658 copies sold during its first week.

== Reception ==
Reception

Aggregate scores
Aggregator	Score
GameRankings	86%
Metacritic	87/100

Review scores
Publication	Score
Famitsu	(N64) 8/10, 10/10, 7/10, 7/10 (GC) 9/10, 9/10, 10/10, 9/10
Game Informer	9.5/10
GamePro	4.5/5
GameSpot	8.1/10
GameSpy	4/5
IGN	9.1/10
Nintendo Power	4.5/5, 3.5/5, 4/5, 5/5, 5/5

Upon its release, Animal Crossing was subject to critical acclaim. It was named the seventh best GameCube game of all time by the television show X-Play on the G4 network. On IGN, the game holds an "outstanding" 9.1 rating.

Some critics praised the game's use of the GameCube's internal clock and calendar and its inclusion of hidden NES games. However, others, such as IGN's Peer Schneider, criticized its audio and visuals for being below-standard quality for a GameCube game. According to the review aggregator site Metacritic, the game received a score of 87 out of 100, indicating "generally favorable reviews" based on 42 critics. According to GameRankings, the game received a score of 86% based on 72 reviews. The game was a commercial success, at more than 2 million copies sold worldwide. By July 2006, 1.3 million copies had been sold, totaling $43 million in the United States. Next Generation ranked it as the 37th highest-selling game launched for the PlayStation 2, Xbox, or GameCube between January 2000 and July 2006 in that country. It is one of the best-selling Nintendo GameCube games.

=== Accolades ===
During the 6th Annual Interactive Achievement Awards, the Academy of Interactive Arts & Sciences awarded Animal Crossing with "Outstanding Innovation in Console Gaming", "Outstanding Achievement in Game Design", and "Console Role-Playing Game of the Year"; it also received nominations for "Outstanding Achievement in Gameplay Engineering", "Console Game of the Year", and "Game of the Year".

GameSpot named it the best GameCube game of September 2002, and gave the game its annual "Best Role-Playing Game on GameCube" award. It was a runner-up for GameSpot's 2002 "Game of the Year on GameCube" prize, but lost to Metroid Prime. The game was ranked 126th in Electronic Gaming Monthly's “The Greatest 200 Video Games of Their Time” in 2006. In 2021, The Strong National Museum of Play inducted Animal Crossing to its World Video Game Hall of Fame.

== Legacy ==
The popularity of the series inspired the creation of an animated film based on the game's sequel Animal Crossing: Wild World, titled Dōbutsu no Mori, which was released exclusively in Japan.
