= Animal Crossing: Pocket Camp =

2017 mobile game

- Developers: Nintendo EPD (Note: Additional work by DeNA); Nintendo Cube
- Publisher: Nintendo
- Director: Kazuyoshi Sensui
- Producer: Hideki Konno
- Series: Animal Crossing
- Engine: Unity
- Platforms: Android, iOS
- Release: Original: AU: October 25, 2017; WW: November 21, 2017; Complete: WW: December 2, 2024
- Genre: Social simulation
- Modes: Single-player, multiplayer

Animal Crossing: Pocket Camp (Note: Japanese: どうぶつの森 ポケットキャンプ, Hepburn: Dōbutsu no Mori Poketto Kyanpu; Animal Forest: Pocket Camp) was a 2017 social simulation game developed and published by Nintendo for iOS and Android devices. An installment in the Animal Crossing series, it was released in Australia in October 2017 and worldwide the following month. The game allows players to interact with a small campsite with various campers, performing small tasks, engaging in commerce, and decorating living spaces.

The game reached its end of service on November 28, 2024, and was replaced with a paid offline version with no micro-transactions called Animal Crossing: Pocket Camp Complete on December 2, 2024.

== Gameplay ==
Animal Crossing is a series of social simulation video games in which players customize their avatars' living spaces and communities by trading materials and favors for decorative items. In Pocket Camp, the player decorates a campsite in lieu of a town, and gathers materials such as wood and cotton from the surrounding area to trade for furniture orders. The player character befriends neighboring animal characters, who can visit the player's campsite, as can other human players both invited and at random. The player's avatar can travel to multiple locations, such as Sunburst Island or Saltwater Shores, and a marketplace that sells furniture and avatar clothing. The player's customization options extend to their avatar's gender, facial traits, and recreational vehicle abode.

Neighbors in nearby "recreation sites" reward the player with crafting materials for completing requests. A local craftsman, the alpaca Cyrus, turns these resources into furniture, pools, and new locations. The player can attract specific neighbors by placing their favorite furniture at the campsite. Each visit increases that relationship's experience level, in a new game mechanic for the series. Akin to previous games, the player can fish and pay off a debt on their home.

In lieu of the villager interaction seen in previous titles, Pocket Camp takes a complex look at the villager relationship system. Each villager has a specific relationship level that is increased by performing tasks and chatting with them each day. The player is then rewarded with furniture and clothing representative of the villager's aesthetic.

The mobile game features optional microtransactions that can be purchased to improve gameplay. Compared to the main series games, a new currency, Leaf Tickets, are obtainable within the game or through microtransactions, which the player can use to reduce in-game timers or to craft without raw materials. The player accrues Leaf Tickets by completing in-game tasks or buying the currency outright through the real-world app store. The player can also trade Leaf Tickets for special event furniture, which attracts specific characters to the player's campsite. The game's developer plans to introduce seasonal events and furniture with limited availability.

In addition to Leaf Tickets, the game features purchasable fortune cookies that reward randomized items depending on type of fortune cookie. These loot boxes are typically released for a limited time, and their themes are typically associated with a villager. Fortune cookies can be found by visiting the Market Place, and they can be purchased by either Leaf Tickets or bells. Players can purchase a fortune cookie for 50 Leaf Tickets or 5,000 bells. Each fortune cookie contains 10 limited-edition items ranging from 3-star ratings to 5-star ratings. The 5-star rating item is the rarest to obtain, and it unlocks a Scrapbook Memory pertaining to the villager associated with the cookie. Fortune cookie purchases also come with redeemable stamp cards. Players receive a stamp every time they purchase a fortune cookie. Every time players reach 10 stamps, they can exchange their stamp cards with a selected fortune cookie item. When players purchase 5 fortune cookies at once for 250 Leaf Tickets, they receive an extra stamp for a total of 6 stamps.

There are several events in the game that are repeated with similar game-play elements and different rewards including Garden events, Fishing tournaments and Scavenger hunts.

== Development ==
Nintendo planned a mobile game in its Animal Crossing series among the company's first smartphone releases, as announced in early 2016. The Animal Crossing series was selected for its wide demographic reach. The mobile game was originally scheduled for release later that year but was later delayed, as Nintendo prioritized its release of Super Mario Run. Over the next year, Nintendo experimented with microtransactions in the mobile Fire Emblem Heroes. On October 25, 2017, Nintendo revealed Pocket Camp during a Nintendo Direct presentation as its fourth mobile app. It was released in Australia the same day for iOS and Android platforms, and was released worldwide on November 21, 2017. An update in December 2017 brought limited edition Christmas-themed items, such as Santa Claus outfits and Christmas trees.

Pocket Camp features gacha gaming loot boxes. Nintendo's concerns over the loot box gameplay present in Pocket Camp led to the decision to revoke access to downloading or playing the game for Belgian users, starting from August 27, 2019.

=== Subscriptions ===
On November 21, 2019, Nintendo released two subscription plans for players to purchase in Animal Crossing: Pocket Camp. The Happy Helper Plan allows users to choose a villager who helps the campsite by gathering materials, earning bells, and fulfilling villager requests. The chosen villager also earns rewards for the player by participating in reoccurring events. The plan gives subscribers 60 Leaf Tickets every time the subscription is renewed. The Furniture and Fashion Plan allows players to save design layouts and distributes five Fortune Cookies to players each month. These Fortune Cookies contain themed furniture/clothing items that are no longer available to purchase in the game. Both subscription plans also help reduce furniture and clothing crafting time, and allow players to access the Pocket Camp Club Journal, which contains articles, images, and videos of Animal Crossing villagers interacting with each other, and increase storage space for players to store furniture items. Upon their release, the Happy Helper Plan cost $2.99 per month, and the Furniture and Fashion Plan cost $7.99 per month.

On January 27, 2022, Nintendo released a third plan, the Merry Memories Plan allowing players to customise an in game planner. The plan allows for access to the planner sticker shop, the ability to link with Google Fit or the iOS Health app to record steps, increased rewards from seasonal in-game events and 20 leaf tickets per month.

=== Animal Crossing: Pocket Camp Complete ===
On August 21, 2024, it was announced that Animal Crossing: Pocket Camp would end its service on November 28 and will be replaced with a paid, offline version without micro-transactions allowing users to transfer their save data. On October 27, 2024, the paid version was revealed to be titled Animal Crossing: Pocket Camp Complete. The paid version released on December 2, 2024, for $19.99, with a temporary discount of $9.99 for the first two months of release. The game includes all previously released items and events (minus various collaboration items such as the Sanrio collection), with one additional year of new content, from December 2024 to September 2025. All available content operates on a four-year cycle.

== Reception ==
Reception

Aggregate score
Aggregator	Score
Metacritic	72/100

Review scores
Publication	Score
IGN	8/10
Nintendo Life	8/10
TouchArcade	4.5/5

Animal Crossing: Pocket Camp received "mixed or average" reviews, according to review aggregator website Metacritic. Praise was given by Polygon for the game's approach to introduce mobile players to the gameplay of the main series games, although the results were somewhat mixed over the time-dependent gameplay. Polygon described the tutorial to be too overly extensive, but welcomed the concept of organizing and completing various activities according to real-time.

=== Player count and revenue ===
As of September 2018, Animal Crossing: Pocket Camp had generated $50 million in revenue. By April 2020, global revenue had risen to more than $150 million. The game reached approximately 7.1 million global downloads that same month, an increase from the 4.5 million downloads recorded in March 2020. April 2020 also marked the game's highest month for player spending, generating an estimated US$7.9 million worldwide. The previous record was set in August 2019, when the game reached roughly US$7.8 million in global spending. As of November 2021, Animal Crossing: Pocket Camp had generated more than US$250 million in lifetime player spending. At the time, it ranked among Nintendo's highest-grossing mobile titles, surpassing Mario Kart Tour and Super Mario Run, and trailing only Fire Emblem Heroes in overall revenue.

Animal Crossing: Pocket Camp Complete generated approximately $2.6 million in one-time premium purchases during its first week and surpassed $3 million in total revenue by December 9, 2024. This reflected an average of about $385,000 in daily gross player spending. On December 8, 2024, the title recorded its highest single-day revenue to date with $505,000, exceeding the daily earnings of the free-to-play version of Animal Crossing: Pocket Camp on any day since December 3, 2017, when it generated $535,000.

=== Accolades ===
Less than a week before its worldwide release, the game won the award for "Studio of the Year" (Nintendo EPD) at the 2017 Golden Joystick Awards; after it was released, it was nominated for "Best Mobile Game" in IGN's Best of 2017 Awards. In Game Informer's Reader's Choice Best of 2017 Awards, it took the lead for "Best Simulation Game". It was also nominated for the A-Train Award for Best Mobile Game at the New York Game Awards 2018, for "Mobile Game of the Year" at the 2018 SXSW Gaming Awards, and for "Mobile Game of the Year" at the 2018 Golden Joystick Awards. At the Famitsu Awards, it won the Excellence Prize.
