= List of Animal Crossing media =

Animal Crossing (Note: Known in Japan as Dōbutsu no Mori (Japanese: どうぶつの森)) is a video game series developed by Nintendo, in which the player lives their own virtual life in a village populated with anthropomorphic animals. The game takes place in real time, reflecting the current time of day and season. The individual games have been widely praised for their uniqueness and innovative nature, which has led to the series becoming one of Nintendo's leading franchises. It was reported in 2007 that 7,000,000 units of games from the Animal Crossing series had been sold.

== Games ==
=== Main series ===
Game	Details
Animal Forest Original release date(s): JP: April 14, 2001	Release years by system: 2001 – Nintendo 64
Animal Forest Original release date(s): JP: April 14, 2001	Notes: Title translates literally as "Animal Forest".; First game in the series, released only in Japan.
Animal Crossing Original release date(s): JP: December 14, 2001; NA: September 15, 2002; AU: October 17, 2003; EU: September 24, 2004	Release years by system: 2001 – GameCube; 2006 – iQue Player
Animal Crossing Original release date(s): JP: December 14, 2001; NA: September 15, 2002; AU: October 17, 2003; EU: September 24, 2004	Notes: Known in Japan as Dōbutsu no Mori+. (Note: Japanese: どうぶつの森+, Hepburn: Dōbutsu no Mori+; lit. Animal Forest+); Enhanced version of the Nintendo 64 game.; Bundled with a Memory Card 59 due to the game's required 58 blocks of save data.; The North American version adds additional content, such as new holidays and items. This version was in turn re-released in Japan in 2003 as Dōbutsu no Mori e+ (Note: Japanese: どうぶつの森e+, Hepburn: Dōbutsu no Mori e+; lit. Animal Forest e+).
Animal Crossing: Wild World Original release date(s): JP: November 23, 2005; NA: December 5, 2005; AU: December 8, 2005; EU: March 31, 2006	Release years by system: 2005 – Nintendo DS
Animal Crossing: Wild World Original release date(s): JP: November 23, 2005; NA: December 5, 2005; AU: December 8, 2005; EU: March 31, 2006	Notes: Known in Japan as Animal Forest: Come Over. (Note: Japanese: おいでよ どうぶつの森, Hepburn: Oideyo Dōbutsu no Mori); The first game in the series to support online play (via Nintendo Wi-Fi Connection).
Animal Crossing: City Folk Original release date(s): USA: November 16, 2008; CAN: November 17, 2008; JP: November 20, 2008; AU: December 4, 2008; EU: December 5, 2008	Release years by system: 2008 – Wii
Animal Crossing: City Folk Original release date(s): USA: November 16, 2008; CAN: November 17, 2008; JP: November 20, 2008; AU: December 4, 2008; EU: December 5, 2008	Notes: Known in Japan as Animal Forest: Let's Go to the City (Note: Japanese: 街へいこうよ どうぶつの森, Hepburn: Machi e ikō yo: Dōbutsu no Mori) and the PAL region as Animal Crossing: Let's Go to the City.; Features an explorable city area located outside the village.; Supports the Wii Speak accessory for voice chat during online play.
Animal Crossing: New Leaf Original release date(s): JP: November 8, 2012; KOR: February 7, 2013; NA: June 9, 2013; EU: June 14, 2013; AU: June 15, 2013	Release years by system: 2012 – Nintendo 3DS
Animal Crossing: New Leaf Original release date(s): JP: November 8, 2012; KOR: February 7, 2013; NA: June 9, 2013; EU: June 14, 2013; AU: June 15, 2013	Notes: Known in Japan as Animal Forest: Jump Out. (Note: Japanese: とびだせ どうぶつの森, Hepburn: Tobidase Dōbutsu no Mori); The player additionally takes the role of the village mayor.; Supports online play via Nintendo Network.
Animal Crossing: New Horizons Original release date(s): WW: March 20, 2020	Release years by system: 2020 – Nintendo Switch
Animal Crossing: New Horizons Original release date(s): WW: March 20, 2020	Notes: Known in Japan as Animal Forest: Gather. (Note: Japanese: あつまれ どうぶつの森, Hepburn: Atsumare Dōbutsu no Mori); Supports online play via Nintendo Network.

=== Spin-offs ===
Game	Details
Animal Crossing: Happy Home Designer Original release date(s): JP: July 30, 2015; NA: September 25, 2015; EU: October 2, 2015; AU: October 3, 2015	Release years by system: 2015 – Nintendo 3DS
Animal Crossing: Happy Home Designer Original release date(s): JP: July 30, 2015; NA: September 25, 2015; EU: October 2, 2015; AU: October 3, 2015	Notes: Known in Japan as Animal Forest: Happy Home Designer. (Note: Japanese: どうぶつの森：ハッピーホームデザイナー, Hepburn: Dōbutsu no Mori: Happī Hōmu Dezainā); The player takes the role of a Nook's Homes employee, designing homes for the animal villagers.
Animal Crossing: Amiibo Festival Original release date(s): NA: November 13, 2015; EU: November 20, 2015; JP: November 21, 2015; AU: November 21, 2015	Release years by system: 2015 – Wii U
Animal Crossing: Amiibo Festival Original release date(s): NA: November 13, 2015; EU: November 20, 2015; JP: November 21, 2015; AU: November 21, 2015	Notes: Known in Japan as Animal Forest: amiibo Festival. (Note: Japanese: どうぶつの森amiiboフェスティバル, Hepburn: Dōbutsu no Mori: amiibo Fesutibaru); Heavily incorporates the use of Animal Crossing-themed Amiibo figurines in game play.; As of December 20, 2015, is the lowest critically reviewed Animal Crossing franchise game, with an aggregated score of 43 on Metacritic.
Animal Crossing: Pocket Camp Original release date(s): AU: October 25, 2017; WW: November 21, 2017	Release years by system: 2017 – iOS, Android
Animal Crossing: Pocket Camp Original release date(s): AU: October 25, 2017; WW: November 21, 2017	Notes: Known in Japan as Animal Forest: Pocket Camp. (Note: Japanese: どうぶつの森 ポケットキャンプ, Hepburn: Dōbutsu no mori poketto kyanpu); A free-to-play game with in-game purchases.

== Other media ==
=== Film ===
Title	Original release date		
Title	Japan	North America	PAL region
Animal Forest: The Movie	December 16, 2006	none	none
Notes: Feature-length, theatrically released animated film produced by OLM, Inc. and distributed by Toho.; Primarily based on Animal Crossing: Wild World.; Earned an estimated ¥1.7 billion (approximately $16,216,000) at the box office.

=== Manga ===
Title	Author	Notes
Dōbutsu no Mori Hohinda Mura Yori (Note: どうぶつの森 ホヒンダ村だより)	Sayori Abe (Note: あべさより Abe Sayori)	Children's manga series based on the Animal Crossing series. It was published in Japanese in Japan by Shogakukan, and in Spanish (simply titled Animal Crossing) by Norma Editorial.
Animal Crossing: New Horizons (Note: あつまれ どうぶつの森 ～無人島Diary～)	Kokonasu Rumba (Note: ココナスルンバ)	Children's manga series based on the Animal Crossing series, with the original manga published in Japan by Shogakukan. The English version was published by Viz Media in the United States, and by Shogakukan Asia in Singapore.
Animal Crossing: The Bestest Island (Note: あつまれ どうぶつの森 とことん！イチバン島)	Ryuhei Osaki (Note: 大崎亮平 Ōsaki Ryūhei)	Children's manga series based on the Animal Crossing series, published in Japan by Shogakukan, with the English version published by Shogakukan Asia in Singapore.
Assemble! Animal Crossing: News from the Carefree Island (Note: あつまれどうぶつの森～のんびり島だより～)	Minori Kato (Note: 加藤みのり Katō Minori)	Children's manga series based on the Animal Crossing series, published in Japan by Shogakukan, with the English version published by Shogakukan Asia in Singapore.

=== Applications ===
Game	Format	First released	Notes
Animal Crossing Clock	DSiWare	4 May 2009 (US, EU)	A themed clock for the Nintendo DSi that can change from Analog to Digital.
Animal Crossing Calculator	DSiWare	4 May 2009 (US, EU)	A themed calculator for the Nintendo DSi.
Animal Crossing Plaza	Wii U eShop	8 August 2013 (Worldwide)	A free WaraWara Plaza-like app/community for Wii U owners, where they could interact and publicly share content from New Leaf. Service was discontinued and the app was delisted on December 22, 2014.
Photos with Animal Crossing	Nintendo 3DS eShop	2014 (Japan), 10 July 2015 (EU)	An AR-photo App which allows for photos of Animal Crossing characters to be taken in real environments via. the use of themed AR Cards. Distributed via. mailing list and competition only in EU regions. Available with Animal Crossing themed e-Shop cards in Japan.
