= Raymond (Animal Crossing) =

- Animal Crossing character
- First appearance: Animal Crossing: New Horizons (2020)

In-universe information
- Species: Cat

Raymond, known as Jack (ジャック, Jakku) in Japanese, is a character in the Animal Crossing series, first appearing in the 2020 release of Animal Crossing: New Horizons for the Nintendo Switch. He is an anthropomorphic cat with heterochromia who may be recruited as a villager on the player's island. He appears in the manga adaptation of New Horizons, where he is portrayed with a vastly different personality, and was added to the 2017 mobile game Animal Crossing: Pocket Camp in an update. Merchandise featuring Raymond includes stickers, magnets, and plushies.

Since his initial reveal, Raymond has gained a fan following which significantly grew following the release of New Horizons. He was one of the most in-demand villagers in the game, due in part to the fact that he was new and could not be obtained using Amiibo cards or figures. Other factors that led to his popularity included his personality, appearance, and willingness to dress in a maid outfit, which made him popular with the LGBT community.

Raymond's popularity grew to a level that led to the creation of fan-made websites, such as Nookazon and nook.market, where players would buy, sell, and trade villagers. Raymond was one of the most popular villagers on these marketplaces, alongside fellow villager Marshal, which led to him being sold for exorbitant prices. The strong attachment some people had to Raymond led to backlash from other Animal Crossing players.

== Concept and creation ==
Raymond, like other villagers in Animal Crossing, was designed with the intention of making players want to "interact with them [and] watch what they are doing." Raymond shares roughly the same silhouette base as all cat villagers, done so to ensure that players can identify them easily as cats. Further, they design them this way so players would imagine what kind of cat they were. He is then given his own texture, though the designers have said they are mindful to not make each villager stand out too much. This method is used to allow them to get creative with cat designs while still having them recognizable as cats. The designers then give them various attributes, behaviors, and personalities; in this case, Raymond received the "smug" personality type, one of multiple personality types available. He is both pleasant to players and will "brag about how cool and good-looking he is." This personality type is the second rarest in the game, and Raymond is the only smug cat villager. Raymond wears a waistcoat, necktie, black glasses, has a tuft of blonde hair, and has heterochromia.

== Appearances ==
Raymond first appeared in 2020 in Animal Crossing: New Horizons, later being added to the 2017 Animal Crossing: Pocket Camp as an update. He was first revealed on the Twitter account Crossing Channel, a third-party Animal Crossing fan account that has worked with Nintendo in the past. Raymond is one of hundreds of villagers that can be residents of the player's island, the main setting of New Horizons. He can be found as a starting villager at the beginning of the game, found on Mystery Island Tours, or be a visitor at the island's campsite. He also appeared in the manga Animal Crossing: New Horizons: Deserted Island Diary, where he was portrayed as severely narcissistic. As is the case with other villagers, the player can interact with Raymond by talking to him and giving gifts.

Raymond has received multiple pieces of official merchandise, including as part of sets of Animal Crossing character stickers and magnets. He has also been included in a set of dolls and plushes, including the Flocky Doll set and All Star Collection. While an Amiibo card of Raymond was not initially available, one was included in a later set of Animal Crossing Amiibo cards. Following the announcement of Animal Crossing Lego sets, a Raymond minifigure became a popular request among fans.

== Critical reception ==
Raymond's willingness to wear a maid outfit contributed to his popularity, particularly with the LGBTQ community

Raymond developed a fandom following his initial reveal. He was identified as a standout member of the New Horizons cast by VG247 writer Nadia Oxford. This popularity persisted following the release of Animal Crossing: New Horizons, and he has been regarded as one of the best villagers in the game. He was among the most popular characters on Tumblr in terms of fan content according to GameSpot, as well as Tumblr head of brand advocacy Amanda Brennan. Brennan noted that Raymond was also popular outside of the Animal Crossing fandom. He was also featured in a user-made bracket tournament of Tumblr sexymen, a label given to fictional characters who are considered mischievous or evil, and who may dress poorly or be misanthropic. The Mary Sue writer Jack Doyle regarded Raymond as a Tumblr sexyman, praising "sexy" elements such as his outfit, heterochromia, flirtiness, willingness to wear a maid outfit, and smug personality. His popularity on Twitter includes fanart, cosplay, and clips from New Horizons. A video of him wearing a maid outfit while playing a tambourine helped him achieve more popularity, including among the LGBT community. Members of the Animal Crossing fandom have regarded him as bisexual due to him being flirty with the player regardless of gender. His particular affinity toward the maid outfit also helped his popularity. Famitsu editor Yumin17 attributed her interest in New Horizons in part to Raymond, whom she recounted visiting every day and sending love letters and gifts. Fanbyte writer Natalie Flores found that, after looking through "passionate fans[']" tweets, Raymond became more endearing to her. Flores attributed the popularity to various aspects, including having an uncommon personality type and being the only smug cat in the game.

Fan-made websites, such as called Nookazon and nook.market, described by NME as "black markets," were created where players would buy and sell resources for Animal Crossing: New Horizons, including villagers, using either in-game currency or Nook Miles Tickets (NMT). Players who are selling a villager have to do so by waiting for the villager to decide to leave his current island, which is referred to as being "in boxes." The seller then opens up their island to the buyer, and the buyer leaves the in-game currency on the ground for the opportunity to enter the villager's house and invite him to their island. The phrase "Raymond in boxes" became a meme in the Animal Crossing community. At one time, the operators of nook.market claimed that half of inquiries were related to Raymond, and was stated by both nook.market and Nookazon as being the most-wanted villager. In-game photos of Raymond have also been put up for sale on this website. Some players have used eBay to purchase in-game currency with real money to afford Raymond. In addition to payments, YouTube channel Crunchy Island set up a maze competition inspired by Nathan for You. Raymond was of particular attention to fans, made more significant by the fact that he did not have an Amiibo card or figure available, and was thus only obtainable randomly. Of villagers in this economy, Raymond is among the most popular villagers, competing with fellow villager Marshal, who is also smug and has a neutral color tone. His various traits, particularly his appearance, interest in fanfiction, and a willingness to wear a maid outfit contributed to his popularity in this market.

Despite Raymond's popularity, there was some backlash, leading to players deleting Raymond by sending him to "the void," involving having him move out without letting another player take him to their village. They would then post about it online to annoy people. People would also post "Raymond in boxes" memes where people would draw or Photoshop Raymond into a box, or ask an absurd price for him. Certain incidents, such as an eBay listing selling Raymond for US$1000 (well above market value) and a post telling someone they don't "deserve" Raymond, led to a "growing backlash" against him. Scams have also been a significant problem, such as one where a person offers the opportunity to merely view Raymond. Writer Patricia Hernandez ascribed this backlash to "weariness" over Raymond, as well as a criticism of the "out-of-control" behavior people who want Raymond sometimes exhibit. In response to the popularity of Raymond, YouTuber PokéNinja decided to offer Raymond for free using a save editor, which allowed him to create save files with Raymond in his game. According to Polygon, he did this because it felt "deeply wrong" as a father, writing: “I kind of envision these kids begging their parents for the most popular villager in the game, and I know there are many parents (especially now) that simply can’t afford to do that." Players attempted to give in-game currency or items, but he declined. This led to PokéNinja creating a service called ACVillagerHaven in order to remove the need for the "Animal Crossing black market" by offering any villager for free.
