= Kazumi Totaka =

Japanese composer and voice actor

- 戸高一生
- Born: August 23, 1967 (age 59); Tokyo, Japan
- Education: Kunitachi College of Music
- Occupations: Composer; sound director; voice actor
- Years active: 1990–present
- Employer: Nintendo (1990–present)
- Musical career
- Genres: Video game music, ambient, jazz, easy listening
- Instruments: Piano; guitar; bass; vibraphone

Kazumi Totaka (戸高 一生, Totaka Kazumi; born August 23, 1967) is a Japanese video game composer and sound director who is best known for his various compositions in many Nintendo games. He occasionally does voice acting as well, most notably voicing Yoshi from the Mario series (starting with Super Mario Bros. Wonder and all games following, Kazumi noticeably changed Yoshi's voice tone), and Captain Olimar from the Pikmin games. He also directed the development of Wii Music.

Totaka has worked for Nintendo since 1990. One of his most famous compositions is the 19-note "Totaka's Song", which is left as an easter egg in many games he has composed for.

== Works ==
Year	Title	Role(s)	Totaka's Song?
1992	X	Music	Yes
1992	Mario Paint	Music with Hirokazu Tanaka and Ryoji Yoshitomi	Yes
1992	The Frog For Whom the Bell Tolls	Music	Yes
1992	Super Mario Land 2: 6 Golden Coins	Music	Yes
1993	The Legend of Zelda: Link's Awakening	Music with Minako Hamano and Kozue Ishikawa	Yes
1995	Virtual Boy Wario Land	Music	Yes
1996	Wave Race 64	Music	
1997	Yoshi's Story	Music	Yes
1999	Mario Artist: Paint Studio	Music with Chris Jojo, Martin Goodall, and Suddi Raval	
2000	Mario Artist: Talent Studio	Music with Kenta Nagata and Toru Minegishi	Yes
2000	Mario Artist: Polygon Studio	Music	
2001	Animal Crossing	Sound director, music with Kenta Nagata, Toru Minegishi, and Shinobu Tanaka	Yes
2001	Luigi's Mansion	Music with Shinobu Tanaka	Yes
2001	Machop at Work	Music with Takuto Kitsuta and Yasushi Ida	
2001	Kingler's Day	Music with Takuto Kitsuta and Yasushi Ida	
2004	Pikmin 2	Sound director, music with Hajime Wakai	Yes
2005	Yoshi Touch & Go	Sound director, music with Asuka Hayazaki and Toru Minegishi	Yes
2005	Animal Crossing: Wild World	Sound director, music with Asuka Hayazaki	Yes
2006	Yoshi's Island DS	Sound supervisor	
2006	Default Wii Channels	Music	
2006	Wii Sports	Sound director, music	
2006	Kenkou Ouen Recipe 1000: DS Kondate Zenshuu	Music	
2008	Super Smash Bros. Brawl	Arrangements (Note: "Title (Animal Crossing)", "The Roost")	
2008	Wii Music	Director	
2008	Animal Crossing: City Folk	Sound director, music with Manaka Kataoka and Shiho Fujii	Yes
2010	X-Scape	Music	Yes
2012	Animal Crossing: New Leaf	Sound director, music with Manaka Kataoka and Atsuko Asahi	Yes
2013	Luigi's Mansion: Dark Moon	Sound supervisor	
2013	Wii Sports Club	Music	
2014	Yoshi's New Island	Sound director, music with Masayoshi Ishi	Yes
2014	Super Smash Bros. for Nintendo 3DS and Wii U	Arrangements (Note: "Wii Sports Resort", "Wii Sports Resort Ver. 2")	
2015	Yoshi's Woolly World	Main theme	
2015	Animal Crossing: Happy Home Designer	Sound director, music	Yes
2016	Mini Mario & Friends: Amiibo Challenge	Music supervisor	
2017	Mario Kart 8 Deluxe	Music with several others	Yes
2018	Super Smash Bros. Ultimate	Arrangements (Note: "Title (Animal Crossing: Happy Home Designer)")	
2018	Mario Tennis Aces	Sound supervisor	
2019	Yoshi's Crafted World	Sound supervisor	
2019	Luigi's Mansion 3	Sound supervisor	
2020	Animal Crossing: New Horizons	Sound director, music with several others	Yes
2026	Yoshi and the Mysterious Book	Sound supervisor	

== Characters portrayed ==
Totaka has voiced several characters for Nintendo games. He mostly voices Yoshi, but he also voices Professor E. Gadd, Captain Olimar, Birdo, K.K. Slider, and formerly Shy Guy from 1997 to 2002.

=== K.K. Slider ===
The character K.K. Slider in Animal Crossing is named Totakeke (とたけけ) in the Japanese version. This name could be derived from how Totaka's name is said in Japanese (Totaka K.) as last names usually come before personal names in the language. K.K. Slider is likewise said to be an animal version caricature of Totaka.

At the Mario & Zelda Big Band Live concert, some fans shouted "Totakeke" while the host grabbed a guitar and gave it to Totaka. Totaka then sat down on a chair like K.K. Slider while Shigeru Miyamoto held a picture of K.K. Slider next to Totaka.

== Totaka's Song ==
The most common form of the melody

"Totaka's Song" is a short, 19-note, 8-bar song hidden in almost every game Totaka has written music for as an easter egg. Its first appearance was in the Game Boy game X, released in 1992. Later that year, it appeared in Mario Paint, where the song was first discovered; it plays if the player clicks on the O in "Mario Paint" on the title screen. It also plays in Super Mario Land 2: 6 Golden Coins (1992) on the game over screen.

The song appears through two different methods in The Legend of Zelda: Link's Awakening (1993), as well as its 1998 re-release and 2019 remake; one is if the player waits in the house owned by the character Richard, the other is if they name their player character "Totakeke" or "Zelda" when starting the game. The latter method was only available in the Japanese 1993 and 1998 versions of the game, using the "Totakeke" method (spelled as "とたけけ"). The 2019 remake added the "Totakeke" method to international releases, as well as the "Zelda" method which plays a remixed version. The song plays during the closing credits of Virtual Boy Wario Land (1995). It plays in Yoshi's Story (1997) if the player stays on the Trial Mode stage select screen.

In Luigi's Mansion (2001), Totaka's Song will play if the player stays on a screen describing the game's controls. In some games of the Animal Crossing series, K.K. Slider will play it on his guitar if the player selects "K.K Song" for him; after this, the song will be available for the player to listen to in their house. In Pikmin 2 (2004), there are two ways to hear the song. One is if the player stays on the "Treasures Salvaged" info screen. The second appears if the player enters one of the game's cave dungeons without a memory card in their GameCube, and stays on the screen telling them to insert a memory card or else they cannot save their game. The latter method was discovered in 2019. In Animal Crossing: City Folk (2008), the character Kapp'n will whistle the song if the player stays on a screen in which he is present. In 2010, Totaka's Song appeared in X-Scape, the sequel to X.

In Mario Kart 8 (2014), one of the Yoshis standing on the side of multiple racetracks in the game will sing Totaka's Song. Totaka sung it as the voice actor for Yoshi in the game. In Animal Crossing: Happy Home Designer (2015), if the player scans in the K.K. Slider amiibo card with their 3DS, the next time the player uses a turntable, Totaka's Song will play.

In Mario Kart World (2025), if the player waits long enough on Yoshi in the character select screen, he will begin to hum, eventually humming Totaka's Song.
