= ACWW =

ACWW may refer to:

- Animal Crossing: Wild World
- Associated Country Women of the World
