= Animal Talking with Gary Whitta =

Virtual talk show

- Also known as: Animal Talking; Animal Talking with Gary Whitta
- Genre: Late-night talk show; Variety show
- Created by: Gary Whitta
- Written by: Gary Whitta
- Presented by: Gary Whitta
- Starring: Gary Whitta; Adam Nickerson
- Theme music composer: Kenny Fong
- Opening theme: "Animal Talking Theme Music"
- No. of seasons: 2
- No. of episodes: 26

Production
- Executive producer: Leah Whitta
- Producers: Gary Whitta; Adam Nickerson
- Production location: Animal Crossing: New Horizons
- Editor: Adam Nickerson
- Running time: approx. 90-200 minutes

Original release
- Network: Twitch; YouTube
- Release: April 25 – October 30, 2020

Animal Talking: The Adventures of Gary Whitta (alternatively known as Animal Talking with Gary Whitta or simply Animal Talking) was a web television virtual talk show hosted by Gary Whitta on Twitch and executive produced by Leah Whitta. The show was livestreamed entirely from a talk show set built in Animal Crossing: New Horizons. Animal Talking premiered on April 25, 2020. It features Adam Nickerson as the bandleader.

The show only lasted for 2 seasons with 25 episodes, and ended on October 10, 2020.

== Background ==
Amidst the COVID-19 pandemic, Gary Whitta began streaming himself playing Animal Crossing: New Horizons daily a month before Animal Talking began, in the form of Animal Crossing Mornings. The show helped the channel gain a growing audience and identity. During his playthrough, Whitta came up with an idea to create a talk show set that paid homage to his favorite shows of the genre, such as The Tonight Show, The Larry Sanders Show, and Between Two Ferns. A pilot episode was livestreamed in the set on April 25 with his friend and internet personality Naomi Kyle, which was well regarded by viewers. The show would later produce four more shows that week, before settling into a Monday, Wednesday, Friday schedule, with a permanent schedule at 7PM PT every Wednesday starting from episode 16.

In December 2020, during one of his Animal Crossing Mornings Twitch streams, Whitta announced he had no plans for new Animal Talking episodes in the foreseeable future by revealing he had redesigned the basement of his Animal Crossing home, where the Animal Talking set had been constructed. Whitta cited anxiety and stress around organizing the show on a weekly basis as his main reason for ending the show.

== Production ==
The show was filmed in Animal Crossing: New Horizons on Gary's island of Kawaii. The set was put together with in-game furniture created by or gifted to the Whittas by viewers of the show. The in-game camera was used to film the show, although its limitations required the host avatar to move for better angles. Guests appeared on the show as Animal Crossing avatars, with the wardrobe supervised by Twitch streamer Kate Stark. On the occasion that a guest did not play Animal Crossing, executive producer and Gary's wife Leah Whitta customized her own avatar to match the appearance of the guest and puppeteered them live as they spoke. The production and guests spoke together through Discord.

Additional staff members included Adam Nickerson, who served as band leader and edited full episodes into ten minute highlight videos for the show's YouTube channel. The logo was designed by Chandana Ekanayake with Leah Whitta. The theme song was composed by Kenny Fong, and also credits Tom Young, Cameron Rose, Chris Petty, Desmond Splitter, Christian Lucy, and K.K. Slider.

Due to the show's viral success, the show was approached by potential sponsors, cable television networks, and advertisers. However, Whitta rejected these opportunities, citing disinterest and stating, "As soon as it becomes cynical, monetized, or corporatized, I think the whimsy and authenticity of it will disappear."

=== Format ===
The show functioned similarly to its real-life counterparts. Each episode started with an opening sequence featuring Whitta's avatar performing various activities around his island, while Snowbike Mike announced that episode's guests. The theme song played in the background as Mike introduced Gary Whitta as the host, who greeted the audience, conversed with Nickerson, and delivered any news about the show.

Following the introduction, main segments included celebrity interviews, live musical performances, and stand-up comedy. While interviews dived into the life of the guests, much of the conversation revolved around gaming and Animal Crossing. At the end of the show, each guest was invited to step up to a mic to deliver a joke, and the best joke among the guests was determined through chat poll votes from the live audience.

A segment Danny's Diary featuring Danny Trejo first aired its debut episode on 8 June. The first episode followed Trejo's avatar giving Nickerson a tour of his own island.

== Episodes ==
=== Season 1 ===
List of episodes

No. overall	No. in season	Original release date	Guest(s)	Musical/entertainment guest(s)
1	1	April 25, 2020	Naomi Kyle	N/A
2	2	April 26, 2020	Leah Whitta, Tanya	N/A
3	3	April 27, 2020	Kate Stark	N/A
4	4	April 29, 2020	Mike Drucker, Mary Kish	Raquel Lily
5	5	May 1, 2020	Felicia Day, Leah Whitta	DJ Cupcakes
6	6	May 4, 2020	Jordan Mechner, Hugh Howey	N/A
7	7	May 6, 2020	iJustine, Mike Krahulik & Jerry Holkins, Joey Noelle	N/A
8	8	May 8, 2020	Colin Trevorrow, Emily Carmichael	Ryan Miller (Guster)
9	9	May 11, 2020	Greg Miller, Chuck Wendig, Samantha Ruddy	N/A
10	10	May 13, 2020	T-Pain, Chastity Vicencio	Very Handsome Billy
11	11	May 14, 2020	Danny Trejo, Elijah Wood, Greg Grunberg, Jessica	N/A
12	12	May 15, 2020	Tim Schafer, What's Good Games	N/A
13	13	May 18, 2020	Cliff Bleszinski, Tom Nichols, LDShadowLady	DJ Cupcakes
14	14	May 20, 2020	Duncan Jones, Paul Scheer	The Dapper Rapper
15	15	May 22, 2020	David Mandel, Rebekah Valentine	N/A

=== Season 2 ===
List of episodes

No. overall	No. in season	Original release date	Guest(s)	Musical/entertainment guest(s)
16	–	June 7, 2020	Noel Clarke, Amy Okuda, Kahlief Adams, Deejay Knight, iamBrandon, Tanya, Riana, Panda Bair, Dripping Honey, and Raquel Lily	N/A
Special 6 hour episode in support of the Black Lives Matter movement, and to raise money for Color of Change.
17	1	June 24, 2020	Sting, Kevin Smith and Marc Bernardin	That Violin Chick
18	2	July 1, 2020	Shaggy, Jordan Vogt-Roberts, Jimmy O. Yang and Kiki Wolfkill	N/A
19	3	July 8, 2020	Simu Liu, Shannon Woodward	Shawn Wasabi and Sophia Black
20	4	July 15, 2020	Josh Gad, Matthew Mercer, Alex Winter	Cavetown and Tessa Violet
21	5	July 22, 2020	Brie Larson, DrLupo, Friskk	Kenny Fong
22	6	July 29, 2020	Susan Orlean, Justin Roiland	The Elwins
23	7	August 5, 2020	Selena Gomez, Cory Barlog, Laura Bailey, Ashley Johnson, Shannon Woodward	Selena Gomez and Trevor Daniel
24	8	August 12, 2020	Phil Spencer, Lisa Loeb, Dylan Sprouse	Lisa Loeb
25	9	October 24, 2020	Shroud, Kate Stark	Gorillaz
26	10	October 30, 2020	Mike Shinoda, iJustine, Lisa Loeb, Greg Miller, Matthew Mercer, Mike Krahulik, Jerry Holkins, Paul Scheer, Naomi Kyle, Friskk	Rebekah Valentine
Special "Halloween Spooktacular" episode.

== Reception ==
The show was well received by viewers. Animal Talking was featured on the Twitch homepage, with its fourth episode reaching over 12,000 viewers, reaching number 14 on the site's most watched streams that day. Episode 10 pulled in a total of 339,000 individual viewers, while Episode 11 reached 18,000 concurrent viewers, a record for the show.

The Verge proclaimed Animal Talking as "2020's Hottest Late-Night Talk Show." Touching on the uniqueness of the concept, Megan Farokhmanesh highlighted the pros of the show taking place in the video game: "On any other talk show, it would be an agonizing minute and a half of mistakes. Here, it's what makes Animal Talking so special." Screen Rant's Christopher Teuton commented that "while most (...) traditional late-night talk show hosts are currently filming (...) and holding interviews over live chat services like Zoom, it's refreshing and unique to see the same format translated so perfectly here inside of Animal Crossing: New Horizons." He praised Whitta's skill as an interviewer and host, saying, "his conversations with Hollywood celebrities, musical geniuses, and video game enthusiasts are almost always just as enjoyable as those of his professional late night show counterparts, if not more so."
