= Mario & Zelda Big Band Live =

Mario & Zelda Big Band Live CD
- Mario & Zelda Big Band Live cover

Live album by various artists
- Released: December 15, 2003
- Genre: Video game music
- Label: Sony/Columbia

Mario & Zelda Big Band Live CD is a recording of a live big band performance of songs based on the Mario and The Legend of Zelda game series. The performance was at Nihon Seinenkan Hall on September 14, 2003. There were many artists who performed during this concert.

== Personnel ==
The Big Band of Rogues is a pseudonym or stagename for Tokyo Cuban Boys Jr., a band based on the Latin Jazz Big-Band, the Tokyo Cuban Boys. The Big Band of Rogues has been touring as the Tokyo Cuban Boys (without the Jr.) since at least 2005.

Coincidentally, Luis Valle, who recorded Trumpet parts for the Mario Kart 8 soundtrack a decade later, would go on to officially join this band.

== Track listing ==
1. Ashura Benimaru Itoh - "Opening Theme of Mario" - 2:24
2. The Big Band of Rogues - "Super Mario 64" - 4:41
3. The Big Band of Rogues & Koji Kondo - "Medley of Super Mario Bros." - 4:25
4. The Big Band of Rogues - "Mario Scat Version" - 2:07
5. The Big Band of Rogues & Seiko - "Go Go Mario" - 3:37
6. The Big Band of Rogues - "Super Mario Bros. 3 Ending Theme" - 2:43
7. Yoshihiro Arita With His Band - "Theme of Athletic" - 4:18
8. Yoshihiro Arita & Kazumi Totaka - "Yoshi on the Beach" - 3:13
9. Yoshihiro Arita With His Band - "Legend of Zelda" - 7:28
10. Yoshihiro Arita With His Band - "Theme of Dragon Roost Island" - 4:22
11. Yoshihiro Arita With His Band & Seiko - "Song of Epona" - 4:06
12. Yoshihiro Arita With His Band - "Theme of The Dolphic Town" - 4:28
13. The Big Band of Rogues - "Zora Band" - 4:43
14. The Big Band of Rogues - "Theme of Goron City" - 3:53
15. The Big Band of Rogues - "Theme of The Shop" - 3:19
16. The Big Band of Rogues - "Medley of The Legend Of Zelda" - 4:32
17. The Big Band of Rogues - "Ending Theme of Super Mario Sunshine" - 4:30
18. All Stars - "Encore (Slider)" - 6:39

== Reception ==
French magazine Joypad gave the album an 8/10 rating, calling it electrifying but noting that those who are not fans of Koji Kondo's music will not enjoy it.
