= X-Scape =

2010 video game

- Developers: Q-Games; Nintendo SPD
- Publisher: Nintendo
- Director: Dylan Cuthbert
- Producer: Kensuke Tanabe
- Artist: Paul Leonard
- Composer: Kazumi Totaka
- Platform: Nintendo DSi
- Release: NA: May 31, 2010; JP: June 30, 2010; PAL: July 16, 2010
- Genre: First-person shooter
- Mode: Single-player

X-Scape, known as X-Returns (Note: Japanese: エックス リターンズ) in Japan and as 3D Space Tank in PAL regions, is a 2010 first-person shooter video game developed by Q-Games and published by Nintendo for the Nintendo DSi's DSiWare service. It is a sequel to Nintendo and Argonaut Software's 1992 Japan-exclusive Game Boy title X, which Cuthbert had designed before founding Q-Games.

== Gameplay ==
Players control a commander who has returned to his home after a decade-long tour of duty. However, an evil warlord has taken control of the entire planet, forcing the commander to take control of an enhanced version of the mobile spacecraft from the game's predecessor, VIXIV. The commander will visit 20 different planets as well as completing a number of main missions and side missions.

X-Scape is seen in a first-person perspective with virtual reality aesthetics. It uses the Nintendo DSi's top screen to show players' surroundings, while the bottom screen acts as a means to control the game and a radar. Moving the stylus to the top of the bottom screen causes the tank to move forward, while moving from side-to-side allows players to look around. Pushing any of the d-pad or face buttons causes the player's tank to fire.

There are two types of missions: tunnel and planet. In tunnel missions, players control the tank, attempting to escape through a narrow tunnel as fast as possible, avoiding barricades, attacking foes, and collecting coins to add to the constantly ticking down timer. In the planet missions, players are able to freely explore the area. They must destroy a set number of enemies throughout the world in order to progress to the next mission. Players are able to fly into the air by hitting pyramid-shaped ramps. Several secrets can be found throughout the game, including an ability to fly into the air at any time. Other tasks on the planet include searching for bombs in order to deactivate them, as well as hackable buildings that reveal the game's backstory.

== Development ==
X-Scape was developed by Q-Games and published by Nintendo for the DSi's DSiWare download service. Its lead designer, Dylan Cuthbert, explained that the development team wanted to return and make a sequel to X. It was chosen to be released for the DSiWare because of its visual style, which designer Kazuyuki Gofuku explained would be difficult to sell as some would not be receptive towards the style. Cuthbert added that the service allowed developers to experiment more than they could in retail games. When asked why this and fellow Q-Games video game Starship Defense were not included in the Art Style series, Gofoku explained that the Art Style games were about visuals and sound, and that it would not be right to force a visual or sound gimmick into a game if it is not necessary. After submitting it for testing to Mario Club, a Nintendo playtesting group, they found that most of them did not understand the motivations of some characters. In response, they added flashbacks scenes to the game to explain the series' plot. This was also done to help English players understand the series' plots, due to the fact that X was not released outside Japan.

Many of the visual clues comes from retro vector games on the Amiga, like Starglider and Starglider 2 for example. X-Scape is Cuthbert's first game as the art director, citing "obvious references" such as Tron for its visual style, as well as other "more obscure references". Kazumi Totaka, who was involved in composing the music for X, collaborated with Q-Games to compose the music for X-Scape. Totaka made many visits to Q-Games to ensure that he understood the game well enough to compose a quality soundtrack.

== Reception ==
Reception

Aggregate score
Aggregator	Score
Metacritic	82/100

Review score
Publication	Score
Nintendo Life	9/10

The review aggregate site Metacritic gave X-Scape an 82 out of 100 based on 5 critics, indicating "generally positive reviews". Nintendo Life said that the game's controls are awkward and imprecise, especially when using the all-button option instead of the touchscreen, and also criticized the absence of a fast-travel feature and the sometimes painful to look at color schemes. However, the reviewer praised the techno soundtrack and gave the game nine out of ten stars, concluding, "Loaded with content, ambitious and borderline experimental in aesthetic, it's got enough meat on its bones to rival a lot of retail releases and certainly stands tall on DSiWare."
