= Katsuya Eguchi =

Japanese game designer

- 江口 勝也
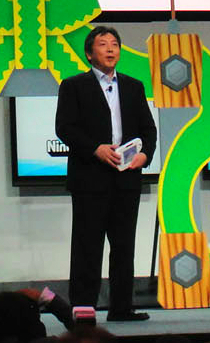
- Eguchi on stage during Nintendo's press conference at E3 2012 holding a white Wii U GamePad
- Born: April 7, 1965 (age 61); Tokyo, Japan
- Occupations: video game designer, director and producer
- Years active: 1986–present
- Employer: Nintendo
- Notable work: Star Fox; Animal Crossing; Wii Sports
- Title: Manager at Nintendo EAD (2003-2013); Deputy General Manager of Nintendo EAD (2013-2015); Deputy General Manager of Nintendo EPD (2015-present); Director at the board of directors in SRD Co., Ltd.

Katsuya Eguchi (Japanese: 江口 勝也, Hepburn: Eguchi Katsuya; born April 7, 1965) is a Japanese video game designer, director and producer at Nintendo. He is the co-creator of the Animal Crossing series and has worked on games including Super Mario World (1990), Star Fox 2 (1995), Wave Race 64 (1996) and Yoshi's Story (1997).

Eguchi was born in 1965 in Tokyo and grew up in Chiba Prefecture. He began work at Nintendo in 1986 and spent some time doing promotional artwork before starting as a designer on Super Mario Bros. 3. He first served as director for Star Fox in 1993. Eguchi became a senior producer of his own EAD software development group and now serves as the Deputy General Manager of Nintendo's Entertainment Planning & Development division.

After Nintendo's acquisition of SRD Co., Ltd. (System Research and Development) in 2022, Eguchi became the Nintendo representative as part of the board of directors.

== Work on Animal Crossing ==
Eguchi is credited with the creation of the Animal Crossing series. Mental Floss writes that "Animal Crossing was inspired by Eguchi’s experiences...when he was a 21 year-old graduate who’d taken the decisive step of moving from Chiba, where he’d grown up and studied, to Nintendo’s HQ in Kyoto." And in addition: "Eguchi wanted to recreate the feeling of being alone in a new town, away from friends and family."

In an interview with Edge, Eguchi described the beginnings of Animal Crossing:

"Animal Crossing features three themes: family, friendship and community. But the reason I wanted to investigate them was a result of being so lonely when I arrived in Kyoto! Chiba is east of Tokyo and quite a distance from Kyoto, and when I moved there I left my family and friends behind. In doing so, I realised that being close to them – being able to spend time with them, talk to them, play with them – was such a great, important thing. I wondered for a long time if there would be a way to recreate that feeling, and that was the impetus behind the original Animal Crossing."

And in an interview with Gamasutra he also described the game's role in a family like his:

"Another thing is that I'd always get home really late. And my family plays games, and would sometimes be playing when I got home. And I thought to myself – they're playing games, and I'm playing games, but we're not really doing it together. It'd be nice to have a play experience where even though we're not playing at the same time, we're still sharing things together. So this was something that the kids could play after school, and I could play when I got home at night, and I could kind of be part of what they were doing while I wasn't around. And at the same time they get to see things I've been doing. It was kind of a desire to create a space where my family and I could interact more, even if we weren't playing together."

== Ludography ==
Year	Title	Position	Ref.
1988	Super Mario Bros. 3	Level designer	
1990	Super Mario World	Area director	
1993	Star Fox	Director	
1996	Wave Race 64	Director	
1998	Yoshi's Story	Level designer	
2000	Mario Artist: Talent Maker	Advisor	
2001	Animal Crossing	Director	
2005	Animal Crossing: Wild World	Producer	
2006	Wii Sports	Producer	
2006	Wii Play	Producer	
2006	Star Fox Command	Supervisor	
2008	Wii Music	Producer	
2008	Animal Crossing: City Folk	Producer	
2009	Wii Sports Resort	Producer	
2012	Nintendo Land	Producer	
2012	Wii U	Hardware producer	
2013	Animal Crossing: New Leaf	Producer	
2013	The Legend of Zelda: A Link Between Worlds	Supervisor	
2015	The Legend of Zelda: Majora's Mask 3D	Senior producer	
2015	Splatoon	General producer	
2015	Animal Crossing: Happy Home Designer	General producer	
2015	The Legend of Zelda: Tri Force Heroes	Supervisor	
2016	The Legend of Zelda: Twilight Princess HD	Senior producer	
2016	Tank Troopers	General producer	
2017	Arms	General producer	
2017	Splatoon 2	General producer	
2017	Star Fox 2	Director	
2018	Splatoon 2: Octo Expansion	General producer	
2018	Starlink: Battle for Atlas	Producer	
2019	Luigi's Mansion 3	Project management	
2019	The Stretchers	Producer	
2020	Animal Crossing: New Horizons	General producer	
2020	Good Job!	Producer	
2020	Xenoblade Chronicles: Definitive Edition	Producer	
2020	Clubhouse Games: 51 Worldwide Classics	Producer	
2020	Paper Mario: The Origami King	Project management	
2020	Kirby Fighters 2	General producer	
2020	Part Time UFO	General producer	
2021	Buddy Mission Bond	Producer	
2021	WarioWare: Get It Together!	Project management	
2022	Xenoblade Chronicles 3	Producer	
2022	Splatoon 3	General producer	
2023	Super Mario Bros. Wonder	Production management	
2023	WarioWare: Move It!	Project management	
2024	Paper Mario: The Thousand-Year Door	Project management	
2024	Luigi's Mansion 2 HD	Project management	
2026	Super Mario Bros. Wonder + Meetup in Bellabel Park	Production management	
