= Animal Crossing: Amiibo Festival =

2015 video game by Nintendo

Animal Crossing: amiibo Festival
- Developers: Nintendo EPD; NDcube
- Publisher: Nintendo
- Director: Aya Kyogoku
- Producer: Hisashi Nogami
- Series: Animal Crossing
- Platform: Wii U
- Release: NA: November 13, 2015; EU: November 20, 2015; JP: November 21, 2015
- Genre: Party
- Modes: Single-player, multiplayer

Animal Crossing: amiibo Festival is a 2015 party video game developed by Nintendo and NDcube and published by Nintendo for the Wii U. Similar to the Mario Party series, the game is a spin-off of the Animal Crossing series that moves away from the series' traditional format, instead being a party game that primarily integrates amiibo figures into the gameplay. Alongside the release of the game, eight Animal Crossing amiibo character figures were released for use in the game. It was released worldwide in November 2015.

Animal Crossing: amiibo Festival was a critical and commercial failure, with criticism for the repetitive gameplay, poor amiibo integration, and lack of innovation, though its presentation was praised.

== Gameplay ==
Gameplay screenshot at E3 2015

Animal Crossing: amiibo Festival is a virtual board game similar in style to the Mario Party series. Playable characters from the Animal Crossing franchise include Isabelle, K.K. Slider, Tom Nook, and Mabel—four of the series' sixteen characters upon which amiibo toys had been based and released upon three waves. The game also supports the amiibo cards which had debuted alongside Animal Crossing: Happy Home Designer, and generally requires the use of amiibo figures for play. Houses designed in Happy Home Designer are also able to be placed into amiibo Festival.

The game also includes a "Happy Points" system, which are converted to "Happy Tickets" used to buy certain outfits in the game. An amiibo figure can save the outfit and the number of happy points on it.

=== Minigames ===
The game features eight minigames which can be unlocked and played by scanning Animal Crossing amiibo cards:

==== Resetti Bop ====
Resetti Bop is a single-player game based on Whac-A-Mole. The player encounters mechanical versions of Mr. Resetti with rock, paper, or scissors symbols on them. The player must scan in the amiibo card corresponding to the winning rock paper scissors move on it.

==== Acorn Chase ====
Acorn Chase is another single-player game requiring three cards. Characters scanned in must gather as many acorns as possible and find the exit. A lawnmower with Mr. Resetti's head slowly moves toward the characters, which ends the game if it makes contact. For movement and changing direction, you must scan a corresponding card, each being left, right, and forward. The directions do not change no matter which way you may be facing.

==== Mystery Campers ====
Mystery Campers is a logic game involving six cards and has four of the six characters on the scanned cards hiding inside tents. The player will have to guess which character is inside which tent in under ten tries. When four of the cards are scanned, the game will tell the player how many are correct and how many are close. The player will use these clues to find the rest of the characters to win the game.

==== Fruit Path ====
Fruit Path is a two-player minigame where both players each pick three cards and play across three turns. The character on the card will move the number of spaces of the die in the top corner of the card. If they see any fruit, they will pick it up and put it in their basket for points. The further each player goes, the more fruit goes in their basket, though as the path extends, pitfalls will appear and will cause the player to lose some of their fruit if their roll causes them to land on it. The player with the most fruit after three turns wins.

==== Balloon Island ====
Balloon Island can be played with 1-4 players and may require 1 or more cards. The character on the card will appear over an island, floating on a balloon. When the card is removed from the scanner, the character will drop and bounce on other balloons above the island. Players earn points by popping balloons and get a score multiplier if the target lands on the island. This game prompts the players to get the most points in under three turns, which works similarly to Fruit Path.

==== Quiz Show ====
Quiz Show allows 1-4 players. It works like a traditional game show. When a question pops up, and the spotlight goes over a player's character, the player with the corresponding card will scan their card and select the correct answer, losing their next turn if they answer incorrectly. Another card can be scanned as a "lifeline". The questions are all related to Animal Crossing, relating to how big a bug might be, or showing a fish and requiring the player to guess which fish it is, or asking what a villager's phrase might be (e.g. "me meow" [Ankha], or "kiddo" [Wolfgang]). The single-player mode is also timed, unlike the multiplayer mode.

==== amiibo Card Battle ====
amiibo Card Battle is a two-player game where each player gets six cards. Each player is to pit their one of their cards against each other each turn. The winner is determined by the values on the card (including rock, paper, scissors symbols and die numbers). There is a glass ball in the middle of the game's digital table that shows a Zodiac symbol each turn, which, if the drawn card has the same symbol, gets an advantage. Whoever wins the most battles after all the cards are used wins.

==== Desert Island Escape ====
Desert Island Escape is the fourth single-player minigame. The player will scan three cards and will have to escape a desert island, hence the name. The player will move in a hexagonal format, with how many moves they are allowed to make decided by a spinner. The player will have to collect three logs along with a sail by landing on the spaces provided to win. The game has a limited turn system involving days and limited food. Every character also has their own proficiencies, like being able to move more spaces or being good at fishing. Items can also be found to make things like gathering food much easier.

== Development ==
Director Aya Kyogoku stated that the game was conceived as a vehicle for the creation of the first Animal Crossing amiibo: "Honestly, we just wanted Animal Crossing amiibo. We wanted the company to make Animal Crossing amiibo, so that's why we made a game that works with them."

The game was announced during the Nintendo Digital Event at E3 2015 for release in Q4 2015 during the holiday season, later specified as November 2015. Kyogoku distinguished the game from Mario Party by stating that the latter is more focused on minigames, while amiibo Festival is more of a board game. The game uses Nintendo's amiibo protocol to insert characters into the game, with eight different amiibo toys bundled with the game's release. The characters each have personal characteristics, including a house associated with the character as designed in Happy Home Designer.

Animal Crossing: amiibo Festival was released exclusively as a retail product and was not digitally available on the Nintendo eShop in any region.

== Reception ==
Reception

Aggregate scores
Aggregator	Score
Metacritic	46/100
OpenCritic	5% recommend

Review scores
Publication	Score
Destructoid	5/10
Eurogamer	Avoid
Famitsu	8/10, 8/10, 8/10, 8/10 (Note: Each of the four reviewers in Famitsu scored the game on a ten-point scale.)
IGN	5/10
Nintendo Life	5/10
Nintendo World Report	4.5/10
VentureBeat	33/100

Unlike its predecessors, Animal Crossing: amiibo Festival received "generally unfavorable" reviews, according to video game review aggregator website Metacritic, with an aggregate score of 46 out of 100. Fellow review aggregator OpenCritic assessed that the game received weak approval, being recommended by only 5% of critics. IGN rated the game at 5 out of 10, saying that the amiibo integration is "cumbersome" and "hard to play with" and that the gameplay is a boring and slow "snooze fest" — having almost fallen asleep while playing. The game was praised as "undoubtedly charming", relaxing, and best played with friends. Nintendo World Report gave the game a 4.5 out of 10, citing "Boring, repetitive gameplay" and "Tak[ing] an hour to get anything good." GamesBeat gave the game 3.3 out of 10 and condemned it for being "a blatant attempt to get you to buy more amiibo, and it's not even a good one at that." In Japan, four critics from Famitsu gave the game a total score of 32 out of 40.

The game proved to be a commercial failure, selling only 20,303 copies within its first week of release in Japan.

== See also ==
- List of Animal Crossing media
- List of Wii U games
- List of party video games
- 2015 in video games
