= X (1992 video game) =

1992 video game

- Developers: Nintendo R&D1; Argonaut Software
- Publisher: Nintendo
- Director: Yoshio Sakamoto
- Producer: Gunpei Yokoi
- Designer: Dylan Cuthbert
- Programmer: Dylan Cuthbert
- Composers: Hirokazu Tanaka; Kazumi Totaka
- Platform: Game Boy
- Release: JP: May 29, 1992
- Genre: Space combat simulation
- Mode: Single-player

X (Note: Japanese: エックス, Hepburn: Ekkusu) is a 1992 space combat simulation video game developed by Nintendo and Argonaut Software and published by Nintendo for the Game Boy. It was only released in Japan. The player assumes the role of the VIXIV starship as it must protect the planet Tetamus II from a mysterious race of aliens. Gameplay involves completing missions assigned by the "Training Academy Coach", ranging from protecting bases from enemy fire or delivering cargo to a certain area.

Notable for being one of the few attempts at a 3D video game on the Game Boy alongside Faceball 2000, X was the creation of Dylan Cuthbert, who would later program the original Star Fox for the Super NES. Commissioned by Argonaut president Jez San after being impressed by the Game Boy at the 1991 Consumer Electronics Show, Cuthbert and a team of programmers were forced to reverse-engineer the system due to official development kits being hard to find. It was designed after Argonaut's earlier game Starglider 2 for the Amiga. Nintendo grew interested in the game during production and convinced Cuthbert and Argonaut to make it a first-party title for the console. A planned North American release named Lunar Chase was cancelled as Nintendo of America felt a game of its type was too complicated for its audience at the time.

X initially received mixed reviews from critics, often being praised for its impressive technological accomplishments but criticized for its high difficulty. Retrospectively, it was acclaimed for its historical importance and gameplay, often being compared to games such as Star Luster. A DSiWare sequel, X-Scape, was released worldwide in 2010.

== Gameplay ==
Translation: "Move the + [cross] button [control pad] up and down to control your speed!"

X is a first-person space combat simulator video game, being one of the few Game Boy games to use 3D visuals. Controlling the starship VIXIV, the player is tasked with completing missions assigned by the Training Academy Coach to protect the planet Tetamus II from being taken over by a mysterious alien race. The VIXIV must complete each of the game's ten stages, referred in-game as "objectives", under a time limit. Objectives range from protecting a base from enemy fire, delivering a load of cargo to a certain area, or shooting down formations of enemies. The VIXIV can fast-travel to other parts of the map by entering large openings found in certain places, with gameplay taking place in a long series of tunnels. Completing objectives awards the player stars, and up to ten can be awarded. A certain number of stars is required to complete each mission, and should the player fail to earn enough he/she will be forced to restart the mission.

The VIXIV has a radar at the bottom of the screen that displays the player's current location and any nearby enemies or objectives. The player can find large openings on the ground in certain areas of the game, which can allow the VIXIV to fast-travel to other sections of the map. The player must complete all ten missions in order to finish the game.

== Development ==
X was designed by Dylan Cuthbert of Argonaut Software, who would later program Star Fox for the SNES. After being intrigued by the Game Boy during the 1991 Consumer Electronics Show, Argonaut president Jez San commissioned Cuthbert to produce a 3D engine for the console and potentially create a game utilizing it. Cuthbert and his development team had to reverse-engineer the Game Boy hardware as official Nintendo development kits were hard to come by, and that Argonaut was virtually unknown to them. A dummy developer kit was produced with a camera pointing at the system, produced by dismantling the console itself with a Tetris cartridge inserted and connecting it to a board made by another Argonaut employee. Cuthbert began work on X once he became familiar with the hardware; he was responsible for creating some of the graphics, most of the game design, and all of the programming. Cuthbert used an Amiga 3000 for development.

Cuthbert stated the inspiration for the game stating, "The game is based on the old 3D games I used to play on the XZ Spectrum, because there were a few back then, I kind of pulled a bunch of ideas and then just kind of assembled them rather haphazardly to make this game"

The development for the game was created in the style of Argonaut's older computer games, notably Starglider 2, featuring full 360-degree movement through space. Its technological accomplishments quickly caught the eye of a Nintendo employee, who urged that they send a ROM of the game to Nintendo's headquarters in Kyoto, Japan. It was presented to both Game Boy creator Gunpei Yokoi and engineer Ishuna, who were "blown away" by its usage of 3D wireframe graphics, requesting that Dylan and his team fly over to Japan and meet them. After being shown to other employees, Nintendo became so impressed with the game that they purchased the rights to it from the original publisher, Mindscape, and made Argonaut an official third-party licensee. Assisting development was Nintendo Research and Development 1 (R&D1), the division responsible for producing the Game Boy itself. The soundtrack was composed by Kazumi Totaka, and is the first game to feature "Totaka's Song".

At first, the title was named Eclipse, but then-Nintendo President Hiroshi Yamauchi insisted upon it being renamed X, calling up director Yoshio Sakamoto a month before development was completed. Nintendo forced Cuthbert and Argonaut to rewrite the 3D engine entirely due to a game-breaking bug that made it unplayable on certain Game Boy systems, due to the company's strict stance on quality. X was released in Japan on May 29, 1992. A North American version titled Lunar Chase was completed by Cuthbert; however, Nintendo of America felt that the idea of a text heavy 3D first-person game was too complicated, and (to his disappointment) cancelled its release. Cuthbert believed that a lack of interest from retailers was also to blame. In a 2018 interview with USgamer, Cuthbert admitted that he lost the source code for Lunar Chase and didn't think to make a backup copy at the time. An official ROM image of the complete English translation of Lunar Chase was unearthed in the 2020 Nintendo data leak. A nearly-finished fan translation was also released online the same day as the official English translation was leaked.

== Reception ==
Reception

Review scores
Publication	Score
Famitsu	27/40
Family Computer Magazine	18.7/30

Early reviews for X were mixed, with many praising its technological accomplishments on the system but criticizing its high difficulty. Famitsu magazine compared the game to Star Luster, being impressed by the game's 3D wireframe technology and sense of realism, while criticizing its difficulty for being too hard for beginners especially. Family Computer Magazine had a similar response, saying that it could drive away potential players with its high difficulty level, while simultaneously praising its 3D gameplay and soundtrack, claiming that it could easily be brought over to the Super Famicom with the addition of color and newer features. Nintendo Power staff were impressed by the technical capabilities of the game, comparing the visuals to the virtual reality BattleTech Center in Chicago, calling it one of the most exciting Nintendo titles. Joypad magazine staff meanwhile found it to be an interesting game, praising it for being so different compared to other Game Boy games.

In retrospect, X has been cited as a landmark title in the Game Boy's lifespan for its usage of 3D wireframe graphics. Polygon listed it as the 30th greatest Game Boy game of all time for being a "tour-de-force of Game Boy technical prowess", highly praising its 3D visuals and free-range movement. They also stated that its technological feats alone made the game worth owning. Writer Sam Machkovech of Ars Technica felt similarly on its technical prowess, calling it "incredible" and lamenting that it was never released in English. Writer Jeremy Parish stated that X was a more impressive creation than Star Fox for not requiring any additional hardware and for being made on the Game Boy, praising its 3D graphics and its more ambitious design compared to Star Fox. Simultaneously, he criticized the game's lack of variety in combat and for several missions being drawn out and repetitive. He concluded his review by saying the game was worth owning for its historical importance and technological accomplishments. He expressed a desire to see it resurrected through a hypothetical Game Boy Mini platform. The book Nostalgia GB Perfect Guide! cited it as an important title in the console's history, saying that it helped pave the way for Star Fox, which was a game created by the collaboration between Nintendo and Argonaut. They recommended the game to fans of similar games such as Star Luster, praising its slow-paced gameplay and soundtrack.
