= Kaeru no Tame ni Kane wa Naru =

1992 role-playing video game

The Frog For Whom the Bell Tolls
- Developers: Nintendo R&D1; Intelligent Systems
- Publisher: Nintendo
- Director: Toru Osawa
- Producer: Makoto Kano
- Programmers: Seiki Sato; Yasuhiko Fujii; Hiroya Kuriyama
- Artists: Masahiko Mashimo; Tomoyoshi Yamane
- Writer: Yoshio Sakamoto
- Composer: Kazumi Totaka
- Platform: Game Boy
- Release: JP: September 14, 1992
- Genre: Action role-playing
- Mode: Single-player

Kaeru no Tame ni Kane wa Naru (カエルの為(ため)に鐘(かね)は鳴(な)る), officially translated as The Frog For Whom the Bell Tolls, is an action role-playing video game developed by Nintendo and Intelligent Systems and published by Nintendo for the Game Boy exclusively in Japan in 1992.

The title is a play on Ernest Hemingway's novel For Whom the Bell Tolls, which is known in Japan as Ta ga Tame ni Kane wa Naru (誰がために鐘は鳴る). This is in turn an allusion to John Donne's famous Meditation XVII.

== Plot ==
In a faraway land, two princes—Richard of the Custard Kingdom, who is skilled at fencing, and the prince of the Sablé Kingdom, the game's main protagonist—have shared a friendly rivalry since they were children. They often compete, although it usually ends in a tie or close win. One day, a messenger arrives from a small neighboring kingdom, warning the princes that the evil King Delarin has invaded the Mille-Feuille Kingdom and captured the princess Tiramisu. In another attempt to best the Prince of Sablé, Richard grabs a boat and sets off towards the kingdom, and the Prince of Sablé goes after him. While on his journey, he, Richard, and others are transformed into frogs in an attempt to reveal the true happenings in this kingdom.

=== Major characters ===
- The Prince of Sablé (also referred to as Prince Sabure, Prince of Sabure, Prince Sablé, Sablé Prince, Prince Sable or Prince of Sable) - The main protagonist of the game, who is named at the beginning by the player. He is a carefree, good-natured, and kindhearted boy, but is not educated in the ways of the world. He always loses against Prince Richard when they fence, but they remain friends despite their rivalry. The kingdom of Sablé, being the wealthiest and most powerful nation in the land, has provided him with a comfortable life; he has never had to worry about money. This upbringing has caused him to think that any problem can be solved by tossing cash at it, which he does many times throughout the game. Through drinking two potions brewed by the witch Mandola, he gains the ability to transform into a frog and a snake, and must use these transformations to progress.
- Prince Richard - The blue-haired prince of the Custard Kingdom and the rival and childhood friend of the Prince of Sablé. Over the course of the game, he and the Prince of Sablé compete to save Princess Tiramisu first. Through strange events, he and his army are transformed into frogs.
- Princess Tiramisu - The ruler of the Mille-Feuille Kingdom, who is known throughout the land for her beauty. Seeking her hand in marriage, King Delarin and his minions, the Croakians, invaded the countryside and laid siege to the castle, and she goes missing shortly after.
- Jam - A thief from the town of A La Mode, who wears an eyepatch and resembles a pirate. He was initially hostile to the Prince of Sablé because he thought he was a member of the Croakian Army. In their second meeting, he steals all of the Prince of Sablé's money. Eventually, the two realize the misunderstanding and became friendly with each other. He is also transformed into a frog by Mandola.
- Mandola - A witch who wears glasses and knows how to brew magic potions. She is also the only one who knows how to destroy King Delarin and restore the kingdom. She has an Aasvogel, a condor-like bird named Polnareff as a pet. At the end of the game, it is revealed that Mandola was the form Princess Tiramisu assumed to go into hiding.
- Lord Delarin - The main antagonist, who captured Princess Tiramisu and released the Croakian army to wreak havoc within the Mille-Feuille Kingdom. It is later revealed that he is a snake who plans to round up all the frogs in the kingdom for a feast.
- Mad Scienstein - A man who works as a scientist at Nantendo Inc. He has a love for wasabi and creates multiple inventions to help the Prince of Sablé, most notably the Ikari-Z, a rideable mech that can be called upon by playing the Z-Flute.

== Gameplay ==
The Prince of Sablé becomes stronger through the acquisition and use of items.

The game's movement is divided into two ways:

- Bird's-Eye Scrolling - A top view that is used throughout most of the game, such as in villages, towns, fields and similar areas. Moving up, down, left, and right on the D+Pad will move the Prince of Sablé in that direction. Enemies are visible, and the player can begin battle by bumping into them.
- 2D-Platforming - A side view that is used in dungeons, caves, castles, and similar areas. The D+Pad moves the Prince of Sablé left and right, while up is used to climb ladders and look up. While looking up, the Prince of Sablé can perform a super jump. As in the overhead view, enemies are visible in this perspective; the player can begin battle by bumping into them.

=== Enemy battles ===
Unlike most games with turn-based combat, the game has automatic combat, without player involvement. When players make the Prince of Sablé touch an enemy, the game does not shift to a battle scene. Instead, it kicks up a dust cloud as the battle ensues and the Prince of Sablé and the enemy engage each other. If the Prince of Sablé is significantly stronger than the enemy, the enemy is instantly defeated. Victory or defeat in a typical battle is gauged by the Prince of Sablé's strength and weapon, attack speed, armor and defense, and the enemy's stats. If a button is pressed during a fight, the player can choose to use an item or run away. Items do various things in battle; for example, wasabi temporarily stuns enemies, and saws deal massive damage to tree enemies. Running away can fail, and it is impossible to run away from certain enemies, usually bosses. For bosses, the player must fill up the Prince of Sablé's life bar and have the most powerful items found at certain points before battling them to win against them. If the Prince of Sablé is victorious, he will gain money, hearts, or other items. If he loses, he will restart from a "hospital" with 3 hearts in the town he last visited, but will retain the money he had when he perished.

=== Transformations ===
As the story advances, the Prince of Sablé gains the ability to transform into a frog and a snake. Each of his three forms have their own special abilities, which are used to progress.

- Human - The form that the Prince of Sablé starts with, which has more attack power than the other two forms. If the prince attempts to enter water as a Human, he will either drown or transform into a Frog (after drinking Mandola's first potion). To transform back into this form, the Prince of Sablé must eat a Joy Fruit or die. He is reverted to Human form upon waking at a hospital.
- Frog - After Mandola gives the Prince of Sablé the frog potion, he gains the ability to transform into a humanoid frog by entering watery areas. This form has the highest jump height of the forms. While in this form, the Prince of Sablé can enter water safely and talk to frogs and some soldiers without fighting them. While in the frog form, if the Prince of Sablé touches an insect-type enemy, he will not engage in a fight - rather, he will "eat" it, regaining a heart. This form cannot fight snakes or foes other than insect-type enemies, and snakes are attracted to it. Besides the Prince of Sablé, Prince Richard, Jam, and many others can take this form.
- Snake - Through drinking Mandola's second potion, the Prince of Sablé gains the ability to transform into a snake by eating a HotSprings Egg. This form has the lowest jump height of the forms. It has the ability to pass through tight holes and talk to snakes without fighting them. While this form cannot fight, it can bite weak enemies, changing them into blocks. If the Prince of Sablé encounters a frog while in this form, he'll terrify it, causing it to flee.

== Development ==
Kaeru no Tame ni Kane wa Naru was created largely by the team behind the Metroid (1986), specifically Intelligent Systems and Nintendo's Research & Development 1 group.

The engine that was used in Kaeru no Tame ni Kane wa Naru was an early version of the one that would be used later in The Legend of Zelda: Link's Awakening (1993). Both games only share two credited staff between them: composer Kazumi Totaka and illustrator Yoichi Kotabe who receives a "special thanks" credit in Kaeru no Tame ni Kane wa Naru.

== Release and reception ==
Kaeru no Tame ni Kane wa Naru was released in Japan for the Game Boy on September 14, 1992. It received re-releases on the Nintendo 3DS Virtual Console in 2012 in Japan. It was released in Japan on the Nintendo Switch via the Nintendo Classics service on May 15, 2024. An unofficial English-language translation patch has released in 2011.

Reception

Review score
Publication	Score
Famitsu	6/10, 7/10, 8/10, 9/10 (Note: Weekly Famitsu's four reviewers gave Kaeru no Tame ni Kane wa Naru individual rankings.)

From contemporary reviews, among the four reviewers in Famitsu two complimented the games humor with one comparing it to Shin Onigashima by Nintendo while the other said the game had an "incredible sense of humor" and they found the main character not being "saint-like" refreshing. Another reviewer said the game was very easy to play and appreciated the game's easiness and how the battles were nearly automated. One reviewer commented that the game was like a gap between major releases to allow Nintendo to experiment with game design.

References to the game appear in Link's Awakening and Super Smash Bros. Brawl (2008).
