= Nookazon =

Community-made e-commerce website

- Official logo
- Website type: Video game trading
- Founder: Daniel Luu
- Services: Video game trading
- Website: nookazon.com
- Commercial: Yes
- Registration: Required
- Launched: April 9, 2020; 6 years ago
- Current status: Active

Nookazon (/ˈnʊkəzɒn/) is a fan-made website that allows players of the 2020 video game Animal Crossing: New Horizons to trade and sell items in-game using their services. The website is named after Amazon, although it more closely resembles Craigslist and eBay.

The website allows users to discover other players selling a specific in-game item and buy the item for a set price, or make an offer. In addition to in-game items such as furniture, fruit and clothing, the website accommodates for trading "villagers" (in-game inhabitants), which comprise a large part of Animal Crossing's gameplay. The name "Nookazon" is a portmanteau of "Tom Nook", the name of one of New Horizons's main characters, and the name "Amazon".

The website was developed to be an alternative to the trading system of the original Animal Crossing: New Horizons Discord server. It surged in popularity after Daniel Luu posted a TikTok about it. The website now includes an app.

== Development ==
Nookazon was founded on April 9, 2020. The website was created and is run by Daniel Luu, a 25-year old software developer also known by the username squishguin on internet platforms. Luu created the website as a result of his frustrations with the current trading systems. He joined the Animal Crossing: New Horizons Discord server, and found a trading message thread there, but was overwhelmed with the quantity of traders and the unorganized nature of the platform. He decided to make a website to solve this problem, with the help of two of his friends. In an interview with SquadState.com, he stated:

So, I got pretty far in the game pretty quickly. I put in a lot of hours, especially during the quarantine. We have so much free time even after work, so I was putting hours and hours and hours into the game and I wanted to see what else was out there, so I decided to join the Animal Crossing Discord. And in the Discord, there's a couple of different channels for trading – fruit trading, furniture trading, things like that – and it's just chaos, right? I mean, when you look at these channels, there's just so many messages, the wait times on each channel are multiple minutes. I'm a software engineer by trade, and I really wanted to put my developer skills to the test and build a marketplace. That's really where it started. I wanted to just organize everything and make it easier for players to connect with each other and trade items.

— Daniel Luu

=== Cataloguing ===
One of the challenges Luu faced when creating Nookazon involved categorizing the many items of furniture and clothing within Animal Crossing. Animal Crossing: New Horizons contains thousands of individual items, all of which had to be catalogued with various colours in order to be listed on the website. To solve this problem, Luu used a "spreadsheet community" in order to create a comprehensive catalogue for all the game's items. He said that "The spreadsheet community is just a small Discord server that was putting together a spreadsheet that had all the Animal Crossing items in it, including pictures and names and variations and things like that." This allowed him to easily account for all of the game's items. The spreadsheet is organised on Google Docs (found here).

The original Nookazon logo, based upon the Amazon logo. The logo has been updated since launch. The current logo is based upon the Animal Crossing iconography (being the leaf) and is designed by @jayquality.

=== Popularity ===
The website went live on 9 April 2020. However, the website received a huge surge in popularity after Luu posted a 15-second TikTok demonstrating how to use the website. After that, internet traffic on the website surged from 6,000 to 180,000 overnight. The website grew beyond the scope of the Animal Crossing Discord, and eventually became an important part of the community, facilitating many trades per day.

Daniel Luu stated, about the surge in popularity and the difficulties he faced with it, that:

I've built plenty of apps before—apps and websites—but nothing like this. [Nookazon] blowing up really challenged me technically as a developer and also a leader of a community. I've worked in other communities and things like that before, but something of this size really was hard to manage... From a technical perspective, we have over 200,000 unique visitors on the site every day, so making sure that the application is fast and that everybody can do everything they want to do—wishlist things, catalogue things—is a big challenge. But it's been an incredible learning experience. I don't think I would have ever gotten this experience without having Nookazon blow up like it did.

— Daniel Luu, in an interview for SquadState.com

== Current release ==
Nookazon is split into two main areas; one is the Nookazon website, which is constructed entirely from scratch and is managed by Daniel Luu and two of his friends; the other, the Nookazon Discord server, is built using channels and bots, and, (as of May 2026) has over 375,000 members, thirty volunteer moderators and is managed by Daniel Luu's friend Brandon. There is also a social media team, composed of three people, that manages Nookazon's social media accounts, compromising of their Instagram, Twitter, TikTok and Facebook profiles, as well as announcements about the website. The website has 270,000 daily unique users and reaches seven million page views a day. Daniel Luu has taken development of the site full time. He stated that "I've cut out a lot of hobbies, like watching YouTube, and spend most of my free time on the site. I don't mind though, because I love working on it, and I would probably be making another app or website if it wasn't Nookazon."

In October 2020, Nookazon held "Spookazon" events, various competitions based around Halloween.

== Trading ==
The various item categories of Nookazon

The website does not carry out the trade itself; it shows a catalogue of items, that in turn display potential sellers. In this respect, it functions more like the online marketplace eBay. The trade is then carried out in Animal Crossing: New Horizons. The website forbids the use of real-life currency; it instead is built off of Animal Crossing: New Horizons's currency of "Bells". The majority of the website's trading is done either on the website itself or on the accompanying Discord server. The website has a comprehensive listing of all the items in the game, created by use of spreadsheets provided by the community. The website has more than nine million item listings. The most popular items on the site are Nook Miles Tickets, followed by the cutting board, ironwood dresser, crescent-moon chair and fish bait.

=== Trading ===
==== Selling ====
Selling an item begins with a listing on the item. Sellers create listings, and specify if they want it to be sold in Bells or Nook Miles Tickets, or both, and specify if they want to ask for offers from buyers, or if they want to limit the buyers to the listing price. Sellers can also specify if they are open to a trade via wishlist items. The listing then appears on a list of listings, organized by default as most recent first. Alternatively, the seller can put an item up for auction. The seller is notified if a deal is accepted. If they want to, the seller can propose a counter offer at a lower or higher price, and the buyer can then do the same.

==== Buying ====
Buying an item begins by finding the item on the website. From here, the item displays buyer listings, which are offers for an item for a specific price. This can be cross-referenced with the average price graph to ensure the buyer is getting a fair trade. The Buyer will suggest a price, which will then be accepted by the Seller, or counter offered. Once the offer is accepted, the trade takes place in game.

==== Exchange ====
Once a deal is accepted, the trade is carried out in Animal Crossing, via a specific code called a Dodo code that allows a player to visit a specific island. Both players drop their trade on the ground; money can be dropped, as well as Nook Miles Tickets. For more expensive trades, like Villagers, a trade facilitator can be requested on Nookazon's Discord. The trade facilitator will be one of around thirty approved trade facilitators. After the trade, buyers and sellers can leave reviews from one to five stars with a comment to inform other users about the trader. This allows Nookazon to manage the level of scam traders on the site. If a trade went badly, the player can "flag" another user. While this does not ban them, it warns other users that they are not entirely trustworthy.

=== Economy ===
In order to keep prices fair, Nookazon has introduced different forms of currency in order to keep a stable economy. One example of this is the introduction of paying with Nook Miles Tickets, highly valued Animal Crossing items. Whereas the value of Bells has gradually decreased over time, the price of Nook Miles Tickets has stayed consistent. As such, Nookazon's economy has two forms of currency; the highly fluctuating bell economy, and the stable Nook Miles Ticket economy. When asked about the fluctuating price of certain popular items in the game, Daniel Luu stated "One thing [Nookazon] has definitely taught me is that people will go crazy over certain items. People just love to have their dream islands come true. Even though sometimes the Discord link on the website doesn't work, people are still figuring out a way to go out and contact people in order to make these trades. It just really shows that there's a need for this marketplace to be safe and easy to use. Those are the things that we really are focusing on moving forward with the platform."

== Criticism and Controversies ==
=== Black Lives Matter controversy ===
Following the George Floyd protests which began in May 2020, users of Nookazon criticized the website's leaders for banning Discord members who posted in support of Black Lives Matter. Nookazon leadership later clarified that they support the protests, pledging to donate $500 towards the cause. They stated that users could opt-in to a "current events" channel where this discussion could take place. This channel was edited to be a non-interactive "global resources" channel with links to protest information.

=== Safe trading and inflated pricing ===
Nookazon has been used by scammers to make users buy overpriced items. To combat this, Nookazon introduced an "average price" graph which showed the average price of the item over time to ensure that users do not buy overpriced items. In addition, a "Safe Trading Guide" is available to all users that outlines various method in which scammers attempt to cheat on buyers and sellers and how to prevent them.

For high value items, users have inflated the price ten-fold, in order to gain the most money possible. One significant instance of this is with villagers, specifically Raymond, a villager new to Animal Crossing: New Horizons. Prices have been inflated into the tens of millions. The high demand for these characters perpetuates the inflation. This occurs with rare furniture items too, with a poster being in the millions. Many have criticised the villager trading system, accusing Nookazon as being in "the darkest corners of the internet". Seasonal materials are also susceptible to large fluctuations in price, with an auction for 100 cherry blossom petals selling at a total of 2.8 million bells.

== Future ==
Nookazon's popularity is attributed partly to the 2020 lockdown and the unprecedented success of Animal Crossing. When asked about how long Nookazon will keep going for, Daniel Luu said: "I don't think I would have ever gotten this experience without having Nookazon blow up like it did... I think the Animal Crossing community has been so great to us, our entire team, and it's such a fun project to work on, so I think even after the quarantine, even after a while, we will continue to support Nookazon. I think it's such a great place for people to connect. Some of the things that people have made are amazing. I think the energy of the community is going to keep us going, for sure."
