= Animal Crossing =

Video game series developed by Nintendo

- Genres: Social simulation; Iyashikei
- Developers: Nintendo EAD (2001–2015); Nintendo EPD (2015–present); NDcube (2015-2017); DeNA (2017)
- Publisher: Nintendo
- Creators: Katsuya Eguchi; Hisashi Nogami
- Platforms: Nintendo 64; iQue Player; GameCube; Wii; Wii U; Nintendo DS; Nintendo 3DS; iOS; Android; Nintendo Switch; Nintendo Switch 2
- First release: Dōbutsu no Mori; April 14, 2001 (Japan)
- Latest release: Animal Crossing: Pocket Camp Complete; December 2, 2024

Animal Crossing (Note: Japanese: どうぶつの森, Hepburn: Dōbutsu no Mori; lit. "Animal Forest" or "Animal Woods") is a social simulation video-game series developed and published by Nintendo. It was created by Katsuya Eguchi and Hisashi Nogami. The player character is a human who lives in a village inhabited by various anthropomorphic animals and can engage in various activities such as fishing, insect catching, and fossil hunting. The series is known for its open-ended gameplay, humorous dialogue, hourly music, and use of the console's internal clock and calendar to simulate real passage of time.

Since its initial release in 2001, five Animal Crossing games have been released worldwide, one each for the Nintendo 64/iQue Player (enhanced and reissued for the GameCube), Nintendo DS, Wii, Nintendo 3DS and Nintendo Switch. The series has been both critically and commercially successful; its best-selling entry, Animal Crossing: New Horizons, had sold 50.29 million copies worldwide as of June 30, 2026. Three spin-off games have also been released: Animal Crossing: Happy Home Designer for Nintendo 3DS, Animal Crossing: Amiibo Festival for Wii U and Animal Crossing: Pocket Camp for mobile devices. Paid DLC for the Nintendo Switch game Animal Crossing: New Horizons was also released, named Happy Home Paradise.

== Gameplay ==
Gameplay in Animal Crossing revolves around talking to various animal characters

In the Animal Crossing games, the player assumes the role of a human character who moves into a rural village populated with anthropomorphic animals and lives there indefinitely. Gameplay is open-ended: players have no defined objectives but are instead encouraged to spend their time in the village performing any number of activities which include collecting items, crafting items, planting plants, insect catching, fishing, and socializing with the village's residents. Animal Crossing games are played in real-time, utilizing the video game console's internal clock and calendar. Thus, the passage of time in the game world reflects that in reality, as well as the current season and time of day. Some in-game events, such as holidays or the growth of a tree, occur at certain times or require some duration of time to have passed.

One notable feature of the Animal Crossing series is the high level of customization available, which affects the outcome of the game. The player character is identified by the real-life player at the start of the game, and their appearance can be modified by buying or designing custom clothes and accessories or changing the hairstyle (introduced in Wild World). The player's house can also be furnished, decorated, and later expanded: the player can purchase and collect furniture and place it anywhere in the house, as well as change both the wallpaper and floor designs. While its terrain, building locations, and initial residents are randomly generated when the game is first begun (except in New Leaf, in which the player decides between four given towns, and New Horizons, in which the player similarly decides between four given islands), the village's name and anthem, as well as some of the residents' catchphrases, are also determined by the player.

Collecting items is a major facet of Animal Crossing: the player can explore the village and gather objects, including fruit from trees, seashells, and discarded items. Nearly all objects can be sold for Bells, the in-game currency. Players collect objects to obtain more Bells, which can then be used to buy furniture and clothing, purchase home expansions, and play games. Many specialized tools are available for other activities such as fishing and insect collecting. Special items, such as fossils and paintings, may be donated to the village museum. The player can choose to socialize with the other animal residents by engaging in conversation, sending and receiving letters, bartering, or playing hide-and-seek. Residents may move in or out of the village depending on the player's actions.

All installments of Animal Crossing allow some form of communication between players, both offline and online. A single village can house up to four human players (eight in New Horizons), though only one can be exploring the village at any given time. The players can interact via written messages through the village post office or bulletin board. The GameCube iteration allows players to travel to other villages by trading memory cards written with the game data, but all subsequent installments allow players to travel and interact online via Nintendo Wi-Fi Connection, although City Folk also allows the DS Suitcase to travel to others' towns.

== Characters ==
While the series features various villagers for each title, certain prominent characters return in each series installment.

Tom Nook is a tanuki (or a raccoon in America) character who functions as both a shop owner and a real estate broker, giving the player a loan for their house and various upgrades while allowing them to pay back their loan with no interest.

Mr. Resetti is a mole character who appears from underground whenever players shut off the game without saving (enabling them to reset random events deemed unfortunate), berating them for circumventing one of the game's systems. Due to a new autosave function, he was "laid off" from his job in Animal Crossing: New Horizons, although he has secured a new job as the Rescue Service operator.

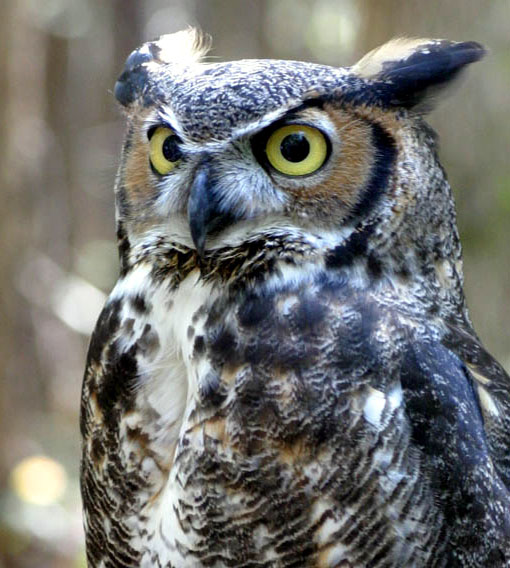
The character Blathers is based on the Great Horned Owl

K.K. Slider is a canine traveling musician, based on series composer Kazumi Totaka, who plays on certain nights in the player's town. Afterwards, he gives the player a free copy of the song played, saying that his music "wants to be free". This was seen by some fans as support for music piracy, although Nintendo denied that it was intended as social commentary.

In New Horizons, Isabelle makes an appearance as the town community manager and secretary to Tom Nook. She was originally introduced in New Leaf, where she served a similar purpose as an assistant to the player character. She allows players to change the town's flag and tune, as well as reset certain aspects of town life, such as nicknames and villager outfits.

Tom Nook's apprentices, Timmy and Tommy (who are also tanukis), manage the convenience store Nook's Cranny in later games in the series. Mabel and Sable are hedgehog characters who manage a clothing store known as the Able Sisters. Blathers is an articulate and educated owl who serves as the village museum curator in each of the games. Orville and Wilbur, two dodo characters introduced in New Horizons, manage Dodo Airlines at the only airport on the deserted island.

== Development ==
Release timeline
| 2001 | Animal Crossing |
2002
2003
2004
| 2005 | Wild World |
2006
2007
| 2008 | City Folk |
2009
2010
2011
| 2012 | New Leaf |
| 2013 | Plaza |
2014
| 2015 | Happy Home Designer |
| 2015 | Amiibo Festival |
2016
| 2017 | Pocket Camp |
2018
2019
| 2020 | New Horizons |
| 2021 | New Horizons – Happy Home Paradise |
2022
2023
| 2024 | Pocket Camp Complete |
2025
| 2026 | New Horizons – Nintendo Switch 2 Edition |

Animal Crossing (Note: Known in Japan as Dōbutsu no Mori (どうぶつの森; lit. Animal Forest)) was originally released in Japan for the Nintendo 64 on April 14, 2001. It was enhanced and released on GameCube the same year. This version was localized and released in North America on September 16, 2002, Australia on October 17, 2003, and Europe on September 24, 2004. An extended version titled "Dōbutsu no Mori e+" was released on June 27, 2003, in Japan. The Nintendo 64 version of the game was released in China in 2006 for iQue Player.

Wild World (Note: Known in Japan as Oideyo Dōbutsu no Mori (おいでよ どうぶつの森; lit. Come to Animal Forest)) was released for the Nintendo DS in Japan on November 23, 2005, North America on December 5, 2005, Australia on December 8, 2005, and Europe on March 31, 2006. It was the first game in the series to use Nintendo Wi-Fi Connection. The game was later re-released on the Wii U Virtual Console on October 13, 2016, although its Wi-Fi multiplayer feature is unavailable due to the discontinuation of Nintendo Wi-Fi Connection.

City Folk, (Note: Known in Japan as Machi e Ikō yo Dōbutsu no Mori (街へ行こうよ どうぶつの森; lit. Let's Go to the City: Animal Forest)) known as Let's Go to the City in Europe and Australia, was released for the Wii in North America on November 16, 2008, Japan on November 20, 2008, Australia on December 4, 2008, and Europe on December 5, 2008. It was later released in South Korea in 2010. It was the first Wii game to utilize the Wii Speak, an accessory that allows players to talk to each other during online play.

New Leaf (Note: Known in Japan as Tobidase Dōbutsu no Mori (とびだせ どうぶつの森; lit. Jump Out Animal Forest)) was announced at E3 2010. It was released for the Nintendo 3DS in Japan on November 8, 2012, North America on June 9, 2013, Europe on June 14, 2013, and Australia on June 15, 2013. For the first time in the series, players are appointed to the role of Mayor. In November 2016, a new update was released entitled Welcome amiibo, adding several new locations, items and activities.

Happy Home Designer is a community simulation video game for the Nintendo 3DS and the first spin-off of the Animal Crossing series. It was released in Japan on July 30, 2015, North America on September 25, 2015, Europe on October 2, 2015, and Australia on October 3, 2015. The game revolves around designing houses for villagers based on their requests. By scanning Amiibo cards, players can unlock the ability to design special characters' houses. The game has a score of 66 out of 100 on Metacritic, which signifies "mixed or average reviews".

Amiibo Festival is a party video game for the Wii U released in November 2015 that heavily utilizes Amiibo. It was met with unfavorable reviews from critics. It was developed by Nintendo Entertainment Planning & Development and NDcube.

In April 2016, Nintendo announced that an Animal Crossing mobile game, later named as Animal Crossing: Pocket Camp, would be released as a part of their mobile game lineup. The game was soft launched in Australia in October 2017, and released worldwide on November 21, 2017. Pocket Camp has a rating of 72 out of 100 on Metacritic.

New Horizons (Note: Known in Japan as Atsumare Dōbutsu no Mori (あつまれ どうぶつの森; lit. Gathering Animal Forest)) was announced in a Nintendo Direct in September 2018 for the Nintendo Switch. The game was released worldwide on March 20, 2020, though its release was initially planned for 2019. It quickly became the first console game to reach five million digital sales within a month, with the high sales often attributed to the social distancing and stay at home orders during the COVID-19 pandemic. Soon after its release, the game became one of the few in the series to receive additional content post-launch, with future additions rumored to be on their way. The game won Best Family Game at The Game Awards 2020. In October 2021, Nintendo announced a paid DLC for Animal Crossing: New Horizons named Happy Home Paradise. The DLC was released on November 5, 2021. Happy Home Paradise is the sequel to Animal Crossing: Happy Home Designer and involves the player designing vacation homes for villagers on an archipelago, a resort dedicated to vacation homes. In this DLC, two new non-villager characters have been introduced. Wardell, a manatee, runs the shop inside of the HQ of the archipelago. Niko, a small monkey, can be found on the docks by a boat. The DLC also adds additional apps to the NookPhone including the Room Sketch and the Happy Home Network app.

On August 21, 2024, the Animal Crossing: Pocket Camp X account had posted a statement informing players about the end of service for the game on November 28. It was replaced with a paid version without microtransactions, titled Pocket Camp Complete. In October 2025, a Nintendo Switch 2 edition of New Horizons was announced for release on January 15, 2026.

=== Apps ===
- Animal Crossing Plaza, a WaraWara Plaza-like app for Wii U. Limited time promotion for Animal Crossing: New Leaf.
- Animal Crossing Clock, a Clock system app for Nintendo DSi and Nintendo 3DS.
- Animal Crossing Calculator, a Calculator app for Nintendo DSi and Nintendo 3DS.
- Photos with Animal Crossing, a Camera app for Nintendo 3DS allowing players to take photos with Animal Crossing characters.

== Reception ==
Sales and aggregate review scores As of March 31, 2025.
| Game | Year | Units sold (in millions) | Metacritic | OpenCritic |
|---|---|---|---|---|
| Animal Crossing | 2001 | 2.71 (Note: Animal Crossing (GameCube) sales: Japan – 1,027,558; Dōbutsu no Mori (2001) – 641,300; Dōbutsu no Mori e+ (2003) – 386,258; United States – 1.68 million) | 87/100 | — |
| Animal Crossing: Wild World | 2005 | 11.75 | 86/100 | — |
| Animal Crossing: City Folk | 2008 | 3.38 | 73/100 | — |
| Animal Crossing: New Leaf | 2012 | 13.06 | 88/100 | — |
| Animal Crossing: Happy Home Designer | 2015 | 3.04 | 66/100 | 16% recommend |
| Animal Crossing: Amiibo Festival | 2015 | 0.09 | 46/100 | 5% recommend |
| Animal Crossing: New Horizons | 2020 | 50.29 | 90/100 | 99% recommend |

The Animal Crossing games have garnered positive responses. The first four main series games are among the best-selling video games for their respective consoles. Animal Crossing has sold 2.71 million copies, Wild World 11.75 million, City Folk 3.38 million, New Leaf 13.04 million, and Happy Home Designer 3.04 million. New Horizons eclipsed the lifetime sales of all past installments within its first six weeks of release, and became the second best-selling game on the Nintendo Switch system with 50.29 million sales. Amiibo Festival was a critical and commercial failure; in Japan, it only sold 87,872 copies. In total, the Animal Crossing franchise has sold 84.3 million units worldwide.

In terms of gross revenue, the mobile game Pocket Camp grossed over $150 million by April 2020. New Horizons grossed an estimated $2 billion in its first year as of March 2021, the fifth highest ever first-year revenue for any video game. This brings combined gross revenue to over $2.15 billion for New Horizons and Pocket Camp as of March 2021.

== Legacy ==
=== Female demographic ===
Former president of Nintendo Satoru Iwata noted that 56% of people who ordered Animal Crossing: New Leaf with a Nintendo 3DS were female. He found the game's success with women between the ages of 19 and 24 to be particularly noteworthy.

=== Hong Kong protests ===
During the COVID-19 pandemic, Animal Crossing: New Horizons was used by democracy activists in Hong Kong as a platform to protest. In reaction, the game, although not officially unavailable in mainland China, has been removed from online stores such as Taobao, but parallel import copies continue to be sold.

=== In other video games ===
In the Wii game WarioWare: Smooth Moves, released in Japan in 2006 and Europe, North America and Australia in 2007, there is a minigame that is modeled after Animal Crossing: Wild World. The player has to catch a fish using the same mechanics as the original game.

The 2008 Wii game Super Smash Bros. Brawl features elements from Wild World. Most prominent is a stage based on the animal village, called "Smashville", which changes its scenery in accordance with the Wii system clock and features a number of songs remixed or extracted from the original game. Mr. Resetti and a pitfall seed, which appear in all Animal Crossing games, are available as an Assist Trophy and an item respectively. Brawl also features 24 collectible trophies based on Animal Crossing characters and items.

Wii Music features two playable songs from Animal Crossing.

The minigame "Animal Crossing: Sweet Day" in Nintendo Land is based on the Animal Crossing game series. The objective of the game is for the Wii Remote players (1–4), to gather large amounts of candy scattered around the area and store them in their head without getting caught by the Gatekeepers, who are controlled using the two Wii U GamePad analog sticks.

A playable character called "Villager" represents the Animal Crossing series as a fighter in Super Smash Bros. for Nintendo 3DS and Wii U and Super Smash Bros. Ultimate. The character has both male and female variants, which are selected when choosing the character. The character's moves include the ability to catch other players in a net and firing Lloid the gyroid as a missile. Additionally, Isabelle from New Leaf appears as an Assist Trophy, and later appeared as a standalone fighter in Ultimate. Two new Animal Crossing stages appear in the games: "Town & City" from City Folk in the Wii U version, and "Tortimer Island" from New Leaf in the 3DS version. "Smashville" from Brawl returns in the Wii U version.

Villager and Isabelle are playable characters in Mario Kart 8 via downloadable content, along with a racetrack based on Animal Crossing and a cup named after the series known as the "Crossing Cup". The two racers, along with the Animal Crossing track, were also included in the Nintendo Switch version of the game Mario Kart 8 Deluxe along with a racing suit based on the series for the Mii.

In June 2015, Isabelle and Mr. Resetti-themed cosmetics were added as costume options for the player's "Palico" companion in Monster Hunter 4 Ultimate.

=== In other media ===
An anime film adaptation of Wild World, titled Dōbutsu no Mori, was released in Japan on December 16, 2006. The film was produced by OLM, Inc. and distributed by Toho. Dōbutsu no Mori earned ¥1.8 billion (approximately $19.2 million) in the box office.

In June 2020, a manga adaptation written and illustrated by Kokonasu Rumba and based on New Horizons, titled New Horizons-Deserted Island Diary, began serialization in Shogakukan's Monthly CoroCoro Comics magazine. In November 2021, the manga was transferred to Bessatsu CoroCoro Comics magazine and the CoroCoro Manga Toshokan web service. The manga is licensed in North America by Viz Media.

In March 2024, five Lego sets involving Animal Crossing characters were released.

== See also ==
- List of Animal Crossing media
