= Animal Crossing: City Folk =

- North American cover art
- Developer: Nintendo EAD
- Publisher: Nintendo
- Directors: Hisashi Nogami; Isao Moro
- Producer: Katsuya Eguchi
- Programmer: Kunihiro Komatsu
- Artists: Ryuji Kobayashi; Tomomi Marunami; Keisuke Umeda; Rikuto Yoshida
- Writers: Arisa Hosaka; Aya Kyogoku
- Composers: Manaka Kataoka; Shiho Fujii
- Series: Animal Crossing
- Platform: Wii
- Release: USA: November 16, 2008; CAN: November 17, 2008; JP: November 20, 2008; AU: December 4, 2008; EU: December 5, 2008
- Genre: Social simulation
- Modes: Single-player, multiplayer

Animal Crossing: City Folk, (Note: Japanese: 街へ行こうよ どうぶつの森, Hepburn: Machi e Ikō yo Dōbutsu no Mori; Let's Go to the City: Animal Forest) released as Animal Crossing: Let's Go to the City in PAL territories, is a 2008 social simulation game developed and published by Nintendo for the Wii console and the third game in the Animal Crossing series. It is also one of the first games that was re-released as a part of the Nintendo Selects collection in 2011.

In City Folk, the player character lives in a rural village populated with anthropomorphic animals, taking part in various activities such as collecting and planting. Similar to other games in the Animal Crossing series the game is synced to the Wii system clock and calendar, allowing the game to be played in real-time and affecting the occurrence of in-game events based on the current time of day or season. City Folk uses Nintendo Wi-Fi Connection, allowing players to visit one another's villages via online play. It is compatible with the Wii Speak accessory, which enables voice chat.

City Folk was announced at E3 2008 and released the same year. It received mixed reviews, with critics labelling it too similar to previous Animal Crossing games. City Folk is one of the best-selling games on the Wii, with 3.38 million copies sold worldwide.

== Gameplay ==
A player's house on Christmas Day

Animal Crossing: City Folk's gameplay is designed to appeal to people who had played previous entries in the franchise, while also appealing to new players as well.

The player's town is populated with anthropomorphic animal characters. The layout of the town is randomized by the game, and the game also randomly selects which animal characters will live in the town.

City Folk allows players to have various conversations with the animal characters, many of which are humorous. Animals can also ask the player to perform errands for them. Players can send letters to the animal townsfolk, and can also give them gifts. The animals can also gossip about the contents of the player's letters.

The game adds new features not found in prior entries in the franchise. One new feature, referred to as "animal tracks" by the developers, is that the player automatically leaves behind trails on routes that they frequently walk on, destroying the grass underneath the trail.

The game uses the real world's date and time to determine what events will occur. Holidays occur in-game, some of which are based on real occurrences. For instance, there is a holiday in the game, based on Thanksgiving, called "Harvest Festival". There is also a character who hands out toys around Christmastime, though Christmas itself is never actually mentioned in the game.

Players can participate in activities which include fishing, bug-catching, and fossil finding. Players can use the Wii Remote for bug-catching and fishing, among other purposes. There is a wide variety of bugs and fish that can be caught, which can be sold or donated to the museum. There is also a large selection of trees and flowers to plant. There are many fossils to be found buried across the village. The player can participate in occasional Bug-Offs or Fishing Tourneys.

Players use a currency known as "bells" in the game. They can acquire bells by selling various items to Tom Nook, the local store owner, things such as fish, bugs, fruit, or almost anything else they may have on their person. Players can save their bells in their own savings account at the "Bank of Nintendo". They may deposit or withdraw bells at the cash machine located at the town hall, known as the "automatic bell dispenser" (ABD). In the Europe version of the game the cash machine is called Bellpoint.

Players have their own house in the game, which is provided and financed by Tom Nook. Nook allows the player to pay off their home over time, rather than all at once. They can go to the ABD machine to pay off some of this debt whenever they like. Once a player pays off a certain amount, their house is upgraded, adding a new story or making the first level of the house bigger. Players may decorate this house anyway they please. The HRA (Happy Room Academy) in the city rates their room, and will pick a room to put on display. Players buy furniture at Tom Nook's, at Redd's in the city, or from other animals in their town. Players can utilize feng shui to earn more points with the HRA, as well as improve their luck in their daily doings, such as catching rare fish or bugs more often.

The city is a new area added to the game. In the city, the player can visit a shop called GracieGrace, run by a giraffe named Gracie. GracieGrace sells high-end in-game items which are incredibly expensive. There is also a character in the city named Phineas, who gives away balloons, free of charge.

The game also has an auction house that the player can use to put items up for sale and let other players bid on their items. The Happy Room Academy is an area in the game where the player can have the quality of their home judged. If the player gets a good score at the Happy Room Academy, a copy of a room in their in-game house will be displayed in the towns of other players.

=== Online connectivity ===
Using online functionality allows players to visit each other's towns.

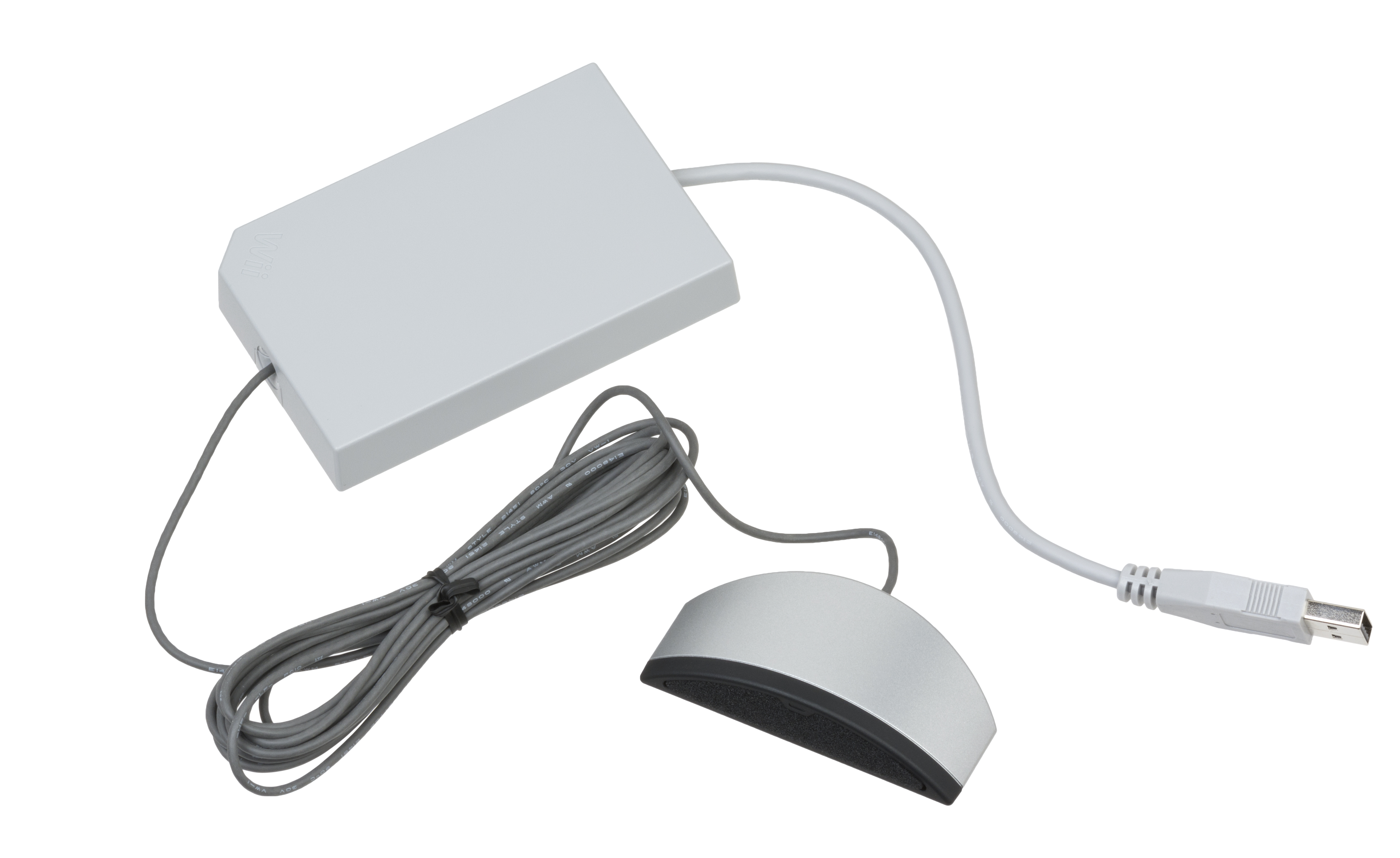
The game is one of the first Wii games to make use of the Wii Speak accessory.

Animal Crossing: City Folk uses Wii Speak, a microphone option for the Wii that enables voice chat over Nintendo Wi-Fi Connection (WFC). Players can communicate with other players by sending messages to their town, Wii Message Board, mobile phone, or personal computer.

An auction house run by Lloid, a "Gyroid", is available in the city, and is where players can auction items to other players via Nintendo WFC. There is also an office for the Happy Room Academy run by Lyle, where players can see how other players' towns are progressing.

As of May 2014, Nintendo Wi-Fi Connection has been terminated, making it impossible to connect online without utilizing a 3rd-party homebrew process.

The game supports Nintendo DS connectivity functionality. Instead of creating a new character, players can import save data from Wild World. A system error occurred with the Australian version of Let's Go to the City when connecting with the Nintendo DS claiming that it was "the wrong game card". Nintendo Australia allowed gamers to send back their game discs to fix the error to allow compatibility.

Additionally, the Nintendo DS can be used to transfer characters between Wii consoles as a means of visiting other players' towns via DS Download Play.

==== Downloadable content ====
Using WiiConnect24, Nintendo periodically sent out downloadable content to online players. These ranged from items to celebrate particular holidays or to commemorate the release of new games. The first item released from Nintendo was the "Red Pikmin Hat". Other items given to players include a "Girl's Day updo" and "Top", Saint Patrick's Day hat, DSi chair (white for EU; black or pink for US), a bag of bells for Tax Day, and a bus model for teacher appreciation week. After summer 2009 began in North America, Nintendo sent players there a hot dog hat, the Dolphin model from Pikmin, ladder shades, a hopscotch flooring, a dresser in the shape of a GameCube, a pile of leaves, an election poster, an anniversary cake, and a Wii locker.

Although these items are no longer officially available, they can still be ordered from Tom Nook's catalog, provided they had been downloaded by the player when they were first available. In the case of patterns given out by Wendell the walrus, if they were originally Japan-only, then they will keep their Japanese names if used with a European or North American version of the game; otherwise, their names will in English, as per usual.

== Development ==
The game was announced as a Wii game that markets the WiiConnect24 feature of the console. In a 2006 interview, Katsuya Eguchi, leader of Animal Crossing's production development, stated, "someone could send a letter from their cellphone or from an email address on a PC to the Wii, and then the player living in the town in Animal Crossing could receive that letter." In another interview with IGN, Katsuya Eguchi also discussed how his team continues exploring potential ways to take advantage of the WiiConnect24 feature such as allowing friends to visit other towns or to leave messages while the machine is in standby mode.

== Reception ==
Reception

Aggregate scores
Aggregator	Score
GameRankings	73.54%
Metacritic	73/100 (50 reviews)

Review scores
Publication	Score
1Up.com	C
Famitsu	33/40
Game Informer	7.5/10
GameTrailers	7.2/10
IGN	7.5/10
Nintendo Life	7/10
Nintendo Power	8/10
X-Play	4/5

Animal Crossing: City Folk received mixed reviews. The Japanese gaming magazine Famitsu gave it a score of 33/40, lower than the 37/40 scores of its predecessors, while Nintendo Power gave the game an 8.0. IGN gave the game a 7.5/10, claiming that while the design of the game is sound, they believed it was too much like its predecessors, calling it "a blending of the GameCube and Nintendo DS games" 1UP.com gave the game a C grade, claiming "City Folk seems like a missed opportunity to improve and enhance the series in almost every possible way." X-Play gave the game a 4 out of 5, praising the gameplay and the addition of Wii Speak while finding it too similar to previous games. The British Official Nintendo Magazine gave the game 90%, saying that the game was "Packed full of Nintendo Charm" and "You'll be playing it for months", but criticized the game as it being "Not new enough for veterans". It was awarded Best Simulation Game for the Wii by IGN in its 2008 video game awards. IGN also nominated it for Best Family Game and Best Online Multiplayer Game.

As of January 4, 2009, Animal Crossing: City Folk has sold 949,000 copies in Japan. It was the 10th best-selling game of December 2008 in the United States, selling in excess of 497,000 copies. It is also the eighth best-selling game of Japan in 2009. As of May 2009, Animal Crossing: City Folk has sold 3.38 million copies worldwide.
