= Animal Crossing: New Horizons =

2020 video game

- Developer: Nintendo EPD (Note: Additional development support by Monolith Soft, SRD, Mario Club, and 1-Up Studio)
- Publisher: Nintendo
- Director: Aya Kyogoku
- Producer: Hisashi Nogami
- Programmers: Yoshitaka Takeshita; Hiromichi Miyake
- Artist: Koji Takahashi
- Writer: Makoto Wada
- Composers: Kazumi Totaka; Yasuaki Iwata; Yumi Takahashi; Shinobu Nagata; Sayako Doi; Masato Ohashi
- Series: Animal Crossing
- Platforms: Nintendo Switch; Nintendo Switch 2
- Release: Nintendo Switch; March 20, 2020; Nintendo Switch 2; January 15, 2026
- Genre: Social simulation
- Modes: Single-player, multiplayer

Animal Crossing: New Horizons (Note: Known in Japan as Atsumare Dōbutsu no Mori (Japanese: あつまれ どうぶつの森; lit. Get Together: Animal Forest)) is a 2020 social simulation game developed and published by Nintendo for the Nintendo Switch. It is the fifth main installment in the Animal Crossing series, following Animal Crossing: New Leaf. In New Horizons, the player controls a character who moves to a deserted island after purchasing a getaway package from Tom Nook, accomplishes assigned tasks, and develops the island as they choose. They can gather and craft items, customize the island, and develop it into a community of anthropomorphic animals.

Development of New Horizons began in 2012, following the release of Animal Crossing: New Leaf. The game director, Aya Kyogoku, retained content from previous games to keep fans happy and also ensured that the game was simple enough to appeal to newcomers. With art and graphics, the developers used the concept of "trigger of play" and the "imagination gap", where the former kept the gameplay simplistic and easy to pick up while the latter kept the art style simple for the player to imagine the rest. The game was announced during a Nintendo Direct in September 2018 and after an extended development period, was released worldwide on March 20, 2020.

New Horizons received acclaim from critics, who praised its gameplay and customization options, although its subsequent updates were given mixed response. The game was nominated for over a dozen awards and was a major commercial success, selling over 50 million copies worldwide and breaking the console game record for most digital units sold in a single month. It has since been considered one of the greatest games of all time, and is the best-selling game in the Animal Crossing series, the second best-selling game on the Nintendo Switch, the best-selling game of all time in Japan, and the 12th best-selling video game in history. Its commercial success has been attributed in part to its release amid global stay-at-home orders during the COVID-19 pandemic. The game has been used as a substitute for social interactions such as weddings and graduation ceremonies, as well as political campaigning and virtual protests. The game also inspired fan creations, such as a trading website, a talk show, comics, and merchandise. It has received several major updates adding new content. An enhanced port for the Nintendo Switch 2 was released on January 15, 2026, alongside the 3.0 update.

== Gameplay ==
As in previous Animal Crossing games, New Horizons is a life simulation game that is played in real time. Weather also adjusts to the seasons of the Northern or Southern Hemisphere, depending on the player's real-world location, a first for the Animal Crossing series. The game follows a villager customized by the player, who, after purchasing a getaway package from Tom Nook, moves into a deserted island. After Tom Nook gives the player essentials, such as a tent, the game proceeds in a non-linear fashion, allowing for the player to play the game as they choose with only a small number of limitations which lessen as the player progresses.

Two players on one island via multiplayer. The player to the right is harvesting wood from a tree using an axe.

The player is given open access to natural resources such as fruit and wood, which can be collected and crafted into a variety of items and furniture through D.I.Y. crafting. Alongside crafting, they can catch bugs and fish, plant and grow trees and flowers, extract natural resources such as rocks, and swim in the ocean to catch deep-sea creatures. The island gives open space for placing items and decorating as the player chooses. Certain content available, such as organisms, are season-dependent and only appear for a limited time of the year. Doing simple tasks rewards the player with "Nook Miles", which in return can be used to purchase premium rewards in Resident Services, such as furniture, recipes, and clothing. The other currency "Bells", a staple in the Animal Crossing franchise, can be used to purchase other goods and services. Another feature offered early on is the "Dodo Airlines", an airport; through Dodo Airlines, and tickets purchased through Nook Miles, the player can visit other vacant islands to harvest resources and meet other villagers. The player can invite other villagers they meet to their island if they choose.

The player starts with two other random anthropomorphic villagers that also purchased the getaway package. These villagers will live alongside the player and can be interacted with, building relationships. When the player has made sufficient progress in the game, Tom Nook gives more freedom of expanding as a village. Other shop owners will visit and settle on the island: museum-owner Blathers, who will display fish, bugs, sea creatures, fossils, and art donated by the player; sisters Mabel and Sable, who sell clothing and other player-created accessories; and Timmy and Tommy, who run a store that specializes in selling furniture and other quality-of-life items, eventually expanding to sell more items per day. That store is named Nook's Cranny. Eventually, the main area will expand to a Town Hall, run by Tom Nook with the help of Isabelle; other buildings and villagers will populate the community, and old tents and shops will grow into a more permanent structure that can still be moved if the player chooses. From there, the island will be given a star rating out of five, usually starting off at a one-star rating. As the island is further developed, the island's star rating will increase. When a three-star rating is achieved, K.K. Slider, a popular musician, will visit and perform a concert at the island, marking the "end" of the game as the credits roll. However, more options for island customization are given to the player for further community growth, such as the ability to construct and destroy cliffs, bodies of water, and paths, colloquially referred to as terraforming.

The game supports one island per Switch system, though other user accounts may join as secondary players. Animal Crossing: New Horizons supports both local and online co-op gameplay, with up to four players locally and eight players online able to occupy an island at any given time, an option available through the Dodo Airlines. The game supports amiibo cards and figures from the Animal Crossing series, which can be used to invite a villager to the island temporarily that can be convinced to join the island.

=== Updates ===
Since the game depends on seasonal changes, New Horizons received frequent updates, adding new seasonal items, events, and sometimes new gameplay features. Most updates are loosely based around national holidays, with the first update being "Bunny Day" in April 2020 and based on Easter. Other seasonal updates followed, such as "Nature Day" (Earth Day), May Day, Halloween, "Turkey Day" (Thanksgiving) and "Toy Day" (Christmas). Other popular seasonal events, such as summer, also came with new items. Each respective update also featured popular characters from past Animal Crossing games. With each update, the island changed in look, and the player's island is often decorated for the occasion. Alongside seasonal changes, Nintendo has also released themed items from other popular media, such as Mario outfits and decor in celebration of the franchise's 35th anniversary. Nintendo Switch Online cloud saving was added during a late July 2020 update, allowing users to recover game data if their Switch is broken or lost.

In an October 2021 New Horizons-focused Nintendo Direct, Nintendo announced the version 2.0 update would be released the following month. At the time, it was announced that it would have been the last free update to the game. The update added returning characters Kapp'n, Brewster, and Harvey, the latter two both bringing new activities to the game. Kapp'n can be found with a boat at the pier after the player achieves a 3-star rating on their island. He runs Mystery tours that allow players to travel to deserted islands, where rare resources can be found. Brewster runs a cafe called The Roost located in the corner of the museum, where players can buy a cup of coffee for 200 bells. Harvey's Plaza allows players to find new purchasable items and services from shops. Other additions include being able to dig up gyroids, establishing ordinances, and cooking to create dishes that give the player power-ups. The update released on November 3, 2021.

==== Happy Home Paradise ====
Announced alongside the 2.0 update was paid downloadable content (DLC), entitled Animal Crossing: New Horizons – Happy Home Paradise. The DLC was released on November 5, 2021, two days after the 2.0 update. Similar to the 2015 spinoff Animal Crossing: Happy Home Designer, the expansion allows players to visit a distant island and design vacation homes for villagers and adds new customization options that can also be used on players' personal islands once learned. It follows the player making vacation homes for several villagers, as well as establishments such as a school and a restaurant. Lottie returns and two new characters are introduced. The player can use wallpaper on an individual wall as opposed to only all four, have villagers live with each other, among many other new features. This DLC may be obtained as part of the Nintendo Switch Online + Expansion Pack, or purchased separately.

==== Nintendo Switch 2 edition and 3.0 update ====
In October 2025, alongside the announcement of the release of the Nintendo Switch 2 edition of the game, a new free update, version 3.0, was announced. The update was released on January 15, 2026, and added a new resort hotel, slumber islands, quality of life improvements such as bulk crafting, a mass flower/custom design removal service (operated by Mr. Resetti), and the ability to use resources in storage when crafting, additional Amiibo functionality, classic game systems that allow players to play certain games on them (akin to the original Animal Crossing), and new collaboration items featuring Lego, The Legend of Zelda, and Splatoon (the latter two also featuring new villagers based on their respective series). The hotel, run by Kapp'n's family, brings a room decorating service similar to Happy Home Paradise, as well as a new currency used to purchase various special items, including past Nintendo systems and toys like the Ultra Hand and Ultra Machine. The hotel is located on the pier on the island. The Switch 2 edition also enables mouse controls using the Joy-Con 2 when designing interiors and custom designs, 4K resolution, and a megaphone using the system's microphone to locate villagers. It also increases the number of players in multiplayer to 12 if everyone is playing on the Switch 2.

== Development ==
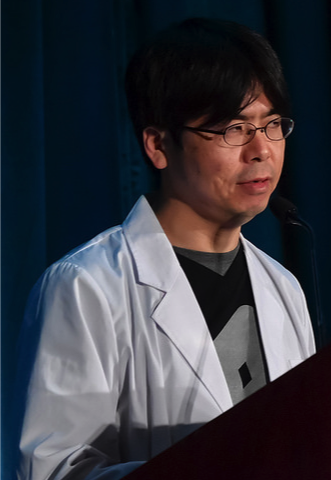
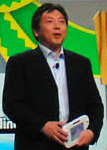
Hisashi Nogami (left) and Katsuya Eguchi (right), the producers of the series

Development of a new main series Animal Crossing game for the Nintendo Switch was confirmed in a Nintendo Direct on September 13, 2018, with an unspecified 2019 release date. Although the game was announced in 2018, game director Aya Kyogoku confirmed that the game had begun development in 2012, shortly after the original release of Animal Crossing: New Leaf for the Nintendo 3DS in Japan; she stated how concepts for the game were forming long before ideas for the Nintendo Switch had even existed. Hisashi Nogami and Katsuya Eguchi reprised their roles as the game's producers.

Nintendo released the game's title and first trailer at its E3 2019 Nintendo Direct on June 11, 2019. The game was delayed until March 20, 2020, with Yoshiaki Koizumi stating that in order "to ensure [that] the game [was] the best it [could] be, [Nintendo had to] ask that [players] wait a little longer than [Nintendo itself] thought." Nintendo of America president Doug Bowser cited a desire to avoid crunch and maintain a healthy work–life balance for Nintendo employees as the primary reason for the delay. Nintendo's stock market value posted a 3.5% loss in reaction to the delay, amounting to a total loss in value of more than US$1 billion.

Kyogoku stated that the success of the Animal Crossing series was due to the fact that the developers make each game different enough from the last, to bring appeal to newcomers yet keep the core concept for returning players. Kyogoku and Nogami stated that they selected a deserted island as the game's setting to differentiate it from previous Animal Crossing games, which are set in established villages, and to allow greater freedom to customize the game's world. Additionally, a deserted island took away established parameters in the series to allow for different ideas and player interactions. Other concepts, such as the internet and multiplayer, were able to be implemented, unlike previous games due to advancing hardware. Kyogoku made sure to keep a balance of introducing new and fresh ideas while retaining core elements to satisfy long-term fans of the series.

The developers were very disappointed when the game's release cycle overlapped with the COVID-19 pandemic. Due to quarantine during the pandemic, Kyogoku hoped that the game would be an "escape" for fans at the time. They emphasized a global release to allow for international connections between the players.

=== Game mechanics and concepts ===
The developers sought to make the game both welcoming to new players and to retain core concepts from the previous games to keep older fans of the series happy. A crafting system was implemented to allow the player to keep the player from running out of things to do after the in-game stores close. Kyogoku mentioned how the D.I.Y. crafting system would keep players in theme with the game by interacting and using the natural environment to their advantage. She took note of players who began playing Animal Crossing games via mobile apps, such as Animal Crossing: Pocket Camp, by implementing the Nook Miles feature which would show the player what kinds of activities and concepts they can achieve by rewarding them to do so. The Nook Miles system also rewards the player for doing common tasks and collecting materials that would sell for cheap to keep the player from only tediously searching out expensive materials. Furniture and clothing accessibility and customization were emphasized for multiplayer so players could show pride in their islands.

Additionally, the developers noticed that players would repeatedly restart their save files in previous titles, in hopes of getting their desired island shape. Because of this, landscaping was implemented to allow for easy shaping of the island. Another issue they noticed was "time-traveling"; due to the game running in real-time, players would change the clock on the console to put themselves further into the future, so they wouldn't have to wait in real-time. To help avoid this, they made sure landscaping and crafting did not have any wait-time restrictions. They also tied seasonal events to updates instead of implementing the content into the game from the beginning so players could not skip ahead and retrieve exclusive items. The interest rate in the game's bank system was also decreased to lower the incentive of time-traveling. Although the developers intended no time-traveling to be the ideal way of playing, they did not shun the concept entirely.

=== Art and graphics ===
Concept artwork for the "Retro Electric Fan"; art designer Hiromi Sugimoto explained how the "imagination gap" leaves furniture designs broad so the player can envision it as a real-life counterpart.

The game's art director, Koji Takahashi, followed the philosophy of "trigger of play" to make sure there was something within the player's field of vision or grasp that they would want to explore. With this, the island was designed from a 45-degree angle similar to that of a cylinder, or a "curved" perspective, where the player could view other content occurring in the background that would "trigger" them to investigate further or interact. By making an everyday concept simple and easy to grasp, it would cause the player to explore it further and be able to easily pick up the new material. Takahashi believed that if the game's art was complicated and realistic, the player would possibly receive too much information and make progression difficult. The simple design allowed for multiples of one object to be stacked close to each other, such as flowers, or allow for simplistic objects to complement others.

By leaving empty space and with a simplistic design, with simple graphics and little nature complexity, Takahashi explains how it would have the player attempt to fill in that gap with their own perspectives and ideas, called the "imagination gap", and further motivation to create their own designs and space with the features available. In the game, the grass is designed to look like that of a checkerboard. Although this concept was only used in prior titles due to a lack of hardware complexity, it was retained because it could be used as a form of expression for the player and allow them to conceptualize ideas with the "imagination gap".

Art designer Hiromi Sugimoto made sure furniture would lead to motivation and hard work, and thus make the player want to connect with others to show off their achievements. She made sure the furniture could be customized by the player to ensure the difference between islands that would motivate visiting others and seeing unique ideas. Each furniture model was designed to have a "likeness" to it which would show exactly what to expect and what the player envisions; the pieces of furniture and items implemented various portions on how players view an object to look like and combine the commons ideas into one model. From there, using the "imagination gap", the player could fill in the smaller nitpicky info they would expect and further imagine how they could use the item.

=== Release ===
The March 20, 2020, release date for New Horizons coincided with that of id Software's Doom Eternal. Due to the demand expected for both games, and in light of the COVID-19 pandemic, GameStop decided to begin selling Doom Eternal one day earlier, on the 19th, to minimize crowding. The stark contrast in tone between both games, combined with them being released on the same day, prompted fans of both series to celebrate the coincidence by creating light-hearted crossover art featuring Doom's Doomguy and Isabelle as "best friends".

Touching on New Horizons in a December 2020 interview with Polygon, Nintendo of America President Doug Bowser stated the game sold "well beyond expectations" and applauded the developers for their efforts. He noted the game would continue to see updates all throughout 2021.

In October 2025, Nintendo announced that an enhanced edition of New Horizons would be released on the Nintendo Switch 2 on January 15, 2026. The Switch 2 version has enhanced features including 4K resolution in docked mode, mouse controls with the Joy-Con 2 controller, an in-game megaphone that uses the system's built-in microphone, online play for up to 12 players and CameraPlay. It is available separately, and as a paid upgrade pack for those who already own the original Switch edition.

== Reception ==
Reception

Aggregate scores
Aggregator	Score
Metacritic	NS: 90/100 (Note: Based on 111 reviews); NS2: 83/100 (Note: Based on 29 reviews)
OpenCritic	NS: 99% recommend (Note: Based on 148 reviews); 76% recommend(Happy Home Paradise) (Note: Based on 22 reviews.); NS2: 68% recommend (Note: Based on 20 reviews)

Review scores
Publication	Score
4Players	8.0/10
Famitsu	38/40
Game Informer	9/10
GameSpot	9/10
GamesRadar+	4.5/5
IGN	9/10
Nintendo Life	10/10
PCMag	4/5
Pocket Gamer	5/5
USgamer	4.5/5
VentureBeat	95/100

Animal Crossing: New Horizons for Nintendo Switch received "universal acclaim" according to review aggregator website Metacritic, becoming the highest-rated game in the series on the website. The Nintendo Switch 2 version received "generally favorable" reviews according to Metacritic. Fellow review aggregator OpenCritic assessed that the game received "mighty" approval from critics on Nintendo Switch, while the Nintendo Switch 2 version received "strong" approval from critics. The game was awarded perfect scores by Nintendo Life and Pocket Gamer. However, the game has been subject to review bombing due to its handling of Switch profiles and multiplayer in which only one player per console can experience the full game.

Most enjoyed the Nook Miles system, stating that it gave the player something to do and a goal to reach. Dann Sullivan, writing for Pocket Gamer, liked how it gave the player "optional direction". USGamer also joked how nobody can complain about how there is nothing to do. The D.I.Y. system was also praised, with Nintendo Life taking note of how no resource is useless. Polygon's Russ Frushtick lauded the ability for unrestricted creativity that allowed for the player to design the island with furniture and building layout, leading to a "true representation of the player who created it." Eurogamer Deputy Editor Martin Robinson stated that the game has some very impressive improvements which allowed for a much clearer and more defined structure overall that gave the game play a better feel and cohesion than ever before.

Critics from GameSpot and Game Informer praised the creative freedom and control offered by the game, such as being allowed to choose where buildings and bridges are placed. In particular, the Island Designer App was lauded for its ability to create natural structures, although there were minor complaints about how the player could not expand the island and could only reshape it. GamesRadar+ appreciated the retaining of old characters and concepts with the addition of new gameplay mechanics. TechRadar lauded the game's sound and visuals, writing "everything is sharp, smooth, colorful and a big improvement on previous releases."

Slant Magazine's Steven Scaife was more critical of the game, arguing that "By consolidating so much power in the hands of an individual player, New Horizons threatens to upend the Animal Crossing vision of community living."

Many had complaints about time restrictions in the early phases of the game. Since the game runs in real-time, most of the resources available replenish the next day, and reviewers were left with little to do in the beginning. IGN's Samuel Claiborn refused to time travel in prior titles, but ultimately was tempted into putting the system's clock ahead 15 days in when more tools were unlocked and to begin what he believed was when the game had faster pacing. 4Players enjoyed the lack of time-related pressure and the option to time travel if preferred.

Outside of gameplay itself, New Horizons received acclaim for the timing of the release, coming out just as stay-at-home orders were being fortified. Reviewer Louryne Strampe of WIRED found that the game was exactly what she needed for her mental health and added that she and her colleagues find solace when visiting each other's respective islands. Due to online multiplayer options, it also gave critics the opportunity to play with friends during quarantine. The release of New Horizons, has also sparked in popularity of the term cozy game which meant that the term was also adopted to various farm sims such as Stardew Valley.

The downloadable content expansion, Happy Home Paradise, was well received. Lisa Segarra of Kotaku found the prompts for designing villager homes to be "exhilarating" and that it "sparked inspiration". She found that the update brought "so much new life into the game". Kate Gray of Nintendo Life described the new content in the expansion and the free update as being comparable to "a big lick of paint over the whole game". The depth and quantity of new content was praised, and minor improvements were deemed to "really make it worth sticking around", though the finality of the update was criticized.

Alex Olney of Nintendo Life finds that although the Nintendo Switch 2 edition of New Horizons had an increase in resolution, there were no improvements to the frame rate and still runs at 30 fps. He also finds that the Switch 2 edition is "not an especially exciting upgrade".

=== Retrospective ===
Due to the seasonal and real-time connection in New Horizons, the game saw multiple second opinions by critics and fans as new content was released, usually of mixed to positive reception. According to Vice Media and VentureBeat about 6 weeks after the release date, players who played the game for large amounts of time shortly after its release tended to suffer from burnout and play significantly less by the time the game had been released for six weeks. Vice Media noted how the game wasn't designed for people to be playing all the time and was rather intended for distraction, but "the pandemic isn't giving people much of a choice"; they reflected on the nature of the Animal Crossing series and how the game is better enjoyed at a slower pace of action. Venturebeat's Jeff Grubb was able to recognize smaller hindrances and slow-paced gameplay that became increasingly frustrating the more he had to use them. Despite this, both reviewers continued to play and looked at the game positively by April 2020.

A year later, past reviews were revisited by Andrew Webster and Brendan Lowry, writing for The Verge and iMore respectively, and both expressed similar thoughts of what the game had become; they both agreed the lack of island progression not continuing beyond a few months made returning difficult to enjoy, with iMore expressing concerns for the lack of upgrades to components such as buildings and shops, and The Verge considering the Nook Miles system to be "an afterthought" rather than goals to look forward to. Both still continued to enjoy daily tasks of tending to the island, however, with both citing how it gives the player something to do and offers a small distraction from the real world. By the release of the November 2021 update, fans were torn on restarting their island entirely to recapture the experience, as highlighted by Nicole Carpenter, writing for Polygon.

=== Sales ===
Animal Crossing: New Horizons sold over 1.88 million physical copies at launch in Japan, breaking the record held by Pokémon Sword and Shield for biggest Switch game debut in the region. The game sold 720,791 physical copies in its second week in Japan, selling more than Animal Crossing: New Leaf did in its first week. As of April 26, 2020, the game has sold 3,895,159 physical copies in Japan. In North America, it was the best-selling game of March 2020, becoming the second-bestselling game of 2020 and surpassing the lifetime sales of all previous Animal Crossing games. New Horizons generated the third highest known launch month sales of any Nintendo-published game (since The NPD Group began tracking video game sales in 1995), after Super Smash Bros. Ultimate (2018) and Super Smash Bros. Brawl (2008). In the United Kingdom, the physical launch sales were roughly quadrupled than those of New Leaf, making it the biggest Switch game launch in the region. It also sold triple the units of the second-bestselling game, new entry Doom Eternal. In Germany, New Horizons sold more than 200,000 copies after a few days of release, for which it has been certified with a Platinum Sales Award by German trade association GAME.

Nielsen division SuperData Research estimates that New Horizons sold five million digital copies worldwide in March 2020, setting a new digital sales record by selling more digital units in a single calendar month than any other console game in history. It surpassed the previous record set by Call of Duty: Black Ops 4 (2018). Nintendo reported that 11.77 million units were sold within 12 days by March 31, 2020, and a total of 13.41 million units after six weeks on the market, making it "the best start ever for a Nintendo Switch title" by the end of its 2019 fiscal year, as well as one of the best-selling games on the console and the best-selling game of the Animal Crossing series. It later sold 22.4 million units worldwide after three months by June 2020 and 26.04 million units after six months by September 2020.

On August 9, 2020, it was reported that Animal Crossing: New Horizons became the second-highest selling game of all time in Japan, only after Pokémon Red and Blue. It was also reported in November 2020 that it was the fastest game to sell over six million copies in Japan. It was the year's best-selling game in Japan, second best-selling game in the United Kingdom, and third best-selling game in the United States. The game grossed $654 million in global digital sales by the end of 2020, making it the year's seventh highest-grossing digital premium game worldwide. In January 2021, The NPD Group revealed the best-selling games of 2020 in the United States. New Horizons was ranked third behind Call of Duty: Black Ops: Cold War and Call of Duty: Modern Warfare. The publication revealed that New Horizons was the best-selling Nintendo game in terms of physical copies in the US since 2010's Wii Fit Plus.

By March 2021, the game had sold 32.63 million units, making it the second best-selling Nintendo Switch game, behind only Mario Kart 8 Deluxe. The game had grossed an estimated $2 billion in its first year as of March 2021, the fifth highest first-year revenue for any video game. After the 2.0 update in November 2021, Nintendo revealed in a financial report that game sales reached 34.85 million units sold. A February 2022 report revealed that the game had sold 37.62 million units, selling more than the rest of the Animal Crossing games combined. On November 9, 2022, it was reported that Animal Crossing: New Horizons became the best-selling game of all time in Japan. As of June 30, 2026, total sales reached 50.29 million copies.

=== Awards and nominations ===
New Horizons has won numerous awards; the game won the categories for "Best Game in China" and "Game of the Year" at the Famitsu Dengeki Game Awards. Additionally, the game also was nominated for "Game of the Year" as well as the best multiplayer and family game at The Game Awards 2020, and ultimately won the "Best Family Game" category. At the Japan Game Awards 2020, the game was nominated for the "Minister of Economy, Trade, and Industry Award" as well as "Game of the Year", and won both categories. The game received an "Award for Excellence" at the event. New Horizons was nominated for similar categories at the Golden Joystick Awards 2020 and won the "Nintendo Game of the Year" category. During the 24th Annual D.I.C.E. Awards, the Academy of Interactive Arts & Sciences awarded Animal Crossing: New Horizons with "Family Game of the Year", along with nominations for "Online Game of the Year" and "Game of the Year". The game was nominated at the 2021 Kids' Choice Awards for Favourite Video Game. The game won the "Game Beyond Entertainment" and "Best Multiplayer" categories at the 2021 British Academy Games Awards (BAFTA) and was nominated for four others. The Game Developers Choice Awards saw nominations for Best Design alongside Game of the Year.

Year	Award Ceremony	Category	Result	Ref.
2020	Famitsu Dengeki Game Awards 2020	Best Game in China	Won	
2020	Famitsu Dengeki Game Awards 2020	Game of the Year	Won	
2020	Japan Game Awards	Minister of Economy, Trade, and Industry Award	Won	
2020	Japan Game Awards	Award for Excellence	Won	
2020	Japan Game Awards	Game of the Year	Won	
2020	Golden Joystick Awards	Ultimate Game of the Year	Nominated	
2020	Golden Joystick Awards	Nintendo Game of the Year	Won	
2020	Golden Joystick Awards	Best Game Community	Nominated	
2020	Golden Joystick Awards	Best Family Game	Nominated	
2020	Golden Joystick Awards	Best Multiplayer Game	Nominated	
2020	The Game Awards 2020	Game of the Year	Nominated	
2020	The Game Awards 2020	Best Multiplayer Game	Nominated	
2020	The Game Awards 2020	Best Family Game	Won	
2021	10th New York Game Awards	Big Apple Award for Best Game of the Year	Nominated	
2021	10th New York Game Awards	Central Park Children's Zoo Award for Best Kids Game	Won	
2021	10th New York Game Awards	Tin Pan Alley Award for Best Music in a Game	Nominated	
2021	24th Annual D.I.C.E. Awards	Game of the Year	Nominated	
2021	24th Annual D.I.C.E. Awards	Family Game of the Year	Won	
2021	24th Annual D.I.C.E. Awards	Online Game of the Year	Nominated	
2021	Kids' Choice Awards	Favorite Video Game	Nominated	
2021	17th British Academy Games Awards	Best Game	Nominated	
2021	17th British Academy Games Awards	Family	Nominated	
2021	17th British Academy Games Awards	Game Beyond Entertainment	Won	
2021	17th British Academy Games Awards	Game Design	Nominated	
2021	17th British Academy Games Awards	Multiplayer	Won	
2021	17th British Academy Games Awards	EE Game of the Year	Nominated	
2021	21st Game Developers Choice Awards	Game of the Year	Nominated	
2021	21st Game Developers Choice Awards	Best Design	Nominated	
2022	25th Annual D.I.C.E. Awards	Family Game of the Year (Happy Home Paradise)	Nominated	

== Impact and legacy ==
Reviewers and news organizations highlighted the game's sense of escapism, in contrast to the COVID-19 pandemic, as attributing to its success. An NBC News op-ed declared, "[New Horizons] is the coronavirus distraction we needed" at a time of widespread social distancing and stay-at-home orders. Imad Khan of The New York Times called the game a "phenomenon", and stated that "with the world in the grip of a pandemic, the wildly popular game is a conveniently timed piece of whimsy, particularly for millennials." Many people have utilized the game in different ways for business and/or socialization. Funerals, weddings, and graduations were held in the game, with even a talk show spawning, titled Animal Talking. The Monterey Bay Aquarium, California, during the COVID-19 pandemic, has regularly held live streams of animal feedings. Twitter revealed, in early January 2021, that Animal Crossing: New Horizons was the most tweeted-about game in 2020. During the lockdowns, the release of the game led to the increased popularity of cozy games. Colin Campbell of GamesIndustry.biz found only "a handful" of the "dozens" of games described as "cozy" on digital distributor Steam were released before 2020.

The Joe Biden 2020 presidential campaign released official digital yard signs for use in the game that players could use to decorate their islands. The game was also used by democracy activists in Hong Kong, including Joshua Wong, as a platform to protest virtually. In reaction, the game was removed from online stores in China such as Taobao where it had been available on the grey market. Nintendo announced on November 19, 2020, a new set of guidelines for using the game, including the ban on using it for political activities.

In March 2021, the National Videogame Museum kept a record of the game and its impact during the COVID-19 pandemic, titled the "Animal Crossing Diaries". The records contain visuals, audio, interviews from players throughout 2020, who kept track of their progress and reflected on their experience and how it affected them. According to Lex Roberts, the curator, the goal was to encapture what made the game so popular, alongside its cultural impact, to players who enjoyed the game after COVID-19 restrictions were settled. They were requested by the Esmée Fairbairn Foundation to "collect the history as it's happening", and they were funded by the charity to do so. The website containing the records opened in September 2021, and covered the 18 months after the game's release.

Two Japanese aquariums have hosted a special Animal Crossing: New Horizons themed event in collaboration with Nintendo. Hakkeijima Sea Paradise, located in Yokohama, held this event during the months of July and August 2021. Umigatari Joetsu Aquarium, in Niigata Prefecture, held the second event for three months in the summer of 2023. Both aquariums offered a stamp rally, exclusive merchandise and many Easter eggs were hidden within their regular exhibits.

=== Related media ===
A tie-in manga series, Atsumare Dōbutsu no Mori: Nonbiri Shima Dayori (あつまれ どうぶつの森〜のんびり島だより〜; lit. "Get Together: Animal Forest (Carefree Island News)"), began serialization in the manga magazine Ciao on December 28, 2019. The series is written and illustrated by Minori Katō, and follows a villager named Hana who moves to an unpopulated island. Another manga series, Atsumare Dōbutsu no Mori: Nonbiri Shima Diary (あつまれ どうぶつの森〜のんびり島ダイアリー〜, Atsumare Dōbutsu no Mori: Nonbiri Shima Daiarī; lit. "Animal Crossing: New Horizons (Carefree Island Diary)"), was launched in the June 2020 issue of Coro Coro Comics. The first volume was published in English as Animal Crossing: New Horizons - Deserted Island Diary on September 14, 2021, by Viz Media.

Nook Tails, a tie-in comic strip series by Cho Hanayo featuring the characters Tom Nook, Timmy, and Tommy, began serialization on the game's Japanese website on October 15, 2019. Multiple guidebooks have been released in Japan, some with well-over 1000 pages. These guides have been greatly popular in the country, with large queues (despite shelter-in-place orders), and prompting mass reselling online.

In January 2021, ColourPop released a makeup collection inspired by the game's characters. In March 2021, Build-A-Bear Workshop announced an Animal Crossing: New Horizons collection of plush toys.

Nintendo announced an aquarium tour throughout the United States starting on June 14, 2024, and running through February 28, 2025. Photo ops, character standees, and much more are available for aquarium visitors.
