= Animal Crossing: Wild World =

2005 social simulation video game

- North American box art
- Developer: Nintendo EAD
- Publisher: Nintendo
- Director: Hisashi Nogami
- Producer: Katsuya Eguchi
- Designer: Ryuji Kobayashi
- Programmer: Masaru Nii
- Artist: Koji Takahashi
- Writers: Takayuki Ikkaku; Arisa Hosaka; Toshihiro Kawabata
- Composers: Kazumi Totaka; Asuka Hayazaki
- Series: Animal Crossing
- Platform: Nintendo DS
- Release: JP: November 23, 2005; NA: December 5, 2005; AU: December 8, 2005; EU: March 31, 2006; KOR: December 6, 2007
- Genre: Life simulation
- Modes: Single-player, multiplayer

Animal Crossing: Wild World (Note: Japanese: おいでよ どうぶつの森, Hepburn: Oideyo Dōbutsu no Mori; "Animal Forest: Come Here") is a 2005 social simulation video game developed and published by Nintendo for the Nintendo DS handheld game console. It was released in Japan in November 2005, in North America and Australia in December 2005, and in Europe in March 2006. It is the second installment in the Animal Crossing series, and the sequel to Animal Crossing on the GameCube.

Wild World focuses on living in a remote village populated with anthropomorphic animals, where the player character is encouraged to perform a number of tasks, such as collecting and planting. Like all Animal Crossing titles, the game is synced to the console's clock and calendar, allowing the game to be played in real-time, which affects the occurrence of in-game events based on the current time of day or season. Wild World utilized Nintendo Wi-Fi Connection, which allowed players to travel and visit the villages of other players via online play, until the service was shut down in May 2014.

The game received positive reviews upon release, garnering aggregate scores of 86/100 on Metacritic and now-defunct GameRankings. Wild World is the ninth best-selling game on the Nintendo DS with 11.75 million copies sold worldwide as of March 31, 2016. It was additionally re-released on the Wii U Virtual Console in October 2016.

== Gameplay ==
The player goes fishing during the daytime.

Like all the games in the Animal Crossing series, Wild World is an open-ended game in which the player assumes the role of a human who has moved into a village populated with anthropomorphic animals. During their time spent in the village, the player is able to perform a number of various activities, such as collecting items, fish and insects, or socializing with the village's residents. The game is synchronized with the Nintendo DS clock and calendar, allowing the game to be played in real-time. For example, both daytime and night will occur in the village depending on the current hour, and snow will fall during the cold months. Different events occur at particular times of the year, such as holidays and the variation of collectible fauna depending on the month or season.

Wild World features a high level of customization. The player character's appearance can be modified to the player's preference: it can be dressed from a large selection of available clothes and accessories, or players can design new clothing patterns from scratch with help from the village tailor, Able Sisters. The environment itself can be modified: trees can be grown or chopped down in any part of the village, and the players share a house that can be furnished with collected furniture and items. Wild World adds the ability to draw constellations that are visible in the night sky.

Wild World utilizes the dual screens of the Nintendo DS in various ways. The game allows players to interact via the system's touch screen and stylus, which is used to manage the players inventory, write messages, draw designs for clothes, or control the character. Unlike the previous iteration which had used a top-down perspective, Wild World allows both the ground and sky to be visible at the same time on each of the screens, allowing the players to view events occurring in the sky without needing to switch perspectives. This is done by using a "rolling log" effect, in which the terrain seems to bend and roll beneath the player's feet when travelling about the village.

=== Online connectivity ===
Wild World was the first game in the Animal Crossing series to feature online play and was the second game on the DS to utilize the now defunct Nintendo Wi-Fi Connection, with which players could visit other villages. Because players were required to exchange and register Friend Codes prior to visiting, connection to random villages was not possible. Up to four DS systems can explore the same village simultaneously. Nintendo Wi-Fi Connection can be used to exchange items and custom-designed patterns between players, as well as receiving exclusive gifts from Nintendo while connected.

Wild World is compatible with its Wii successor, Animal Crossing: City Folk. Players are able to transfer their player from Wild World to City Folk via a wireless connection between the two consoles.

As of May 20, 2014, online functionality offered through Nintendo Wi-Fi Connection is no longer accessible. The discontinued services include online play, matchmaking and leaderboards in which Animal Crossing: Wild World, as well as many other online DS and Wii games, are affected.

== Development ==
The game was announced at E3 2004 under the tentative title Animal Crossing DS, where it was revealed to utilize the Nintendo DS touch screen and implement multiplayer capabilities. When development on Animal Crossing: Wild World began, it was decided that nothing was going to be region-specific in order to make the game easier to localize. Therefore, certain events that were originally observed in Animal Crossing, such as those based on Halloween, Christmas, and the Japanese Cherry Blossom Festival, are not observed in Wild World. This rule was applied to the variety of fish and insects the player is able to collect.

=== Technical issues ===
On January 26, 2006, a blank letter was sent to a number of players connected to Nintendo Wi-Fi Connection that contained a glitch item called "Red Tulips" that was able to corrupt saved game data. If placed on the floor inside the player's house, the item would create an invisible and indelible "wall" that rendered the spot in which it was positioned useless. Nintendo issued an official statement regarding the glitch, telling players that the bug was not caused by a hacker but was due to an internal error with the upload tool used to send exclusive gifts to players, and recommended that users who received the letter delete it whenever possible.

In 2008, journalists who were sent copies of Animal Crossing: City Folk for review were also sent copies of Wild World that contained existing save data to demonstrate the game's ability to transfer a player's inventory from Wild World to City Folk. On December 3, it was reported that one of the animal characters in the modified copies of Wild World had its customizable catchphrase set to "Ñiggá". The edited slur had not been caught by the game's profanity detection system, which prevents players from setting character dialogue to anything deemed distasteful. Nintendo issued an official apology and recalled the modified copies, stating that the incident was caused by a wireless function that automatically transfers catchphrases between games.

== Reception ==
Reception

Aggregate scores
Aggregator	Score
GameRankings	86%
Metacritic	86/100

Review scores
Publication	Score
1Up.com	A
Computer and Video Games	9.0/10
Electronic Gaming Monthly	7.8/10
Eurogamer	8/10
Famitsu	37/40
GamePro	3.5/5
GameSpot	8.4/10
GameSpy	4.5/5
IGN	8.8/10
Nintendo Power	9.5/10
Nintendo World Report	9.5/10

Awards
Publication	Award
IGN	Editors' Choice Award
IGN	Best DS Online Game (2005)
Parents' Choice	2006 Video Game Award

Animal Crossing: Wild World received positive reviews, gaining an aggregate score of 86 out of 100 on Metacritic.

Some reviews felt that Wild World did not entirely expand upon what Animal Crossing had to offer, referring to the changes as incremental. While some reviews liked the implementation of using either the Nintendo DS buttons or the touch screen for game control, Nintendo World Report felt that using the touch screen for controlling the player character was "imprecise," and IGN felt that "Nintendo did not take the [game] down a path that takes advantage of this touch screen control." The absence of familiar holidays, which were removed to ease the localization process, was also criticized.

The addition of online play was praised by many critics. Computer and Video Games felt that the online play "extends the experience into true social gaming," and IGN stated that "Nintendo gave us everything we were asking for when playing the GameCube version: a much more intuitive way of trading items and enjoying other players' creations. And, at the very least, the company succeeded." However, multiplayer was also criticized for its tedious implementation and questionable restrictions, specifically the requirement of Friend Codes and the inability to send mail to other players unless he or she was visiting that person's village. Other online oddities mentioned include the disappearance of all animal residents during the visit and the fact that North American and European players are unable to connect with Japanese players. Wild World producer Katsuya Eguchi stated that these limitations were due to hardware and memory constraints.

During the 9th Annual Interactive Achievement Awards, the Academy of Interactive Arts & Sciences nominated Animal Crossing: Wild World for "Simulation Game of the Year". In 2009, Official Nintendo Magazine called the game "Brilliant!", placing it 23rd on a list of greatest Nintendo games.

=== Sales ===
On December 1, 2005, Media Create stated that Animal Crossing: Wild World sold 325,460 copies in Japan in its first week of availability, beating the previous mark set by Jump Super Stars and becoming the best-selling title for the Nintendo DS until the release of Brain Age 2. It was the 29th best-selling game in Japan as of 2008, selling 4.7 million copies by July that year. It received a "Double Platinum" sales award from the Entertainment and Leisure Software Publishers Association (ELSPA), indicating sales of at least 600,000 copies in the United Kingdom.

As of March 31, 2016, Wild World has sold 11.75 million copies worldwide.

=== Legacy ===
Elements from Wild World are featured in the 2008 crossover fighting game Super Smash Bros. Brawl for the Wii, such as a stage based on a village from the game named "Smashville", which changes its scenery in accordance to the console's system clock, and several remixes of music tracks.
