= List of Nintendo home video games =

Nintendo is a Japanese multinational video game company headquartered in Kyoto. It develops, publishes, and manufactures both video games and video game consoles. Since the release of the Color TV-Game 6 in 1977, Nintendo has consistently created home console video games, until the introduction of the Nintendo Switch in 2017, pivoting the company to produce video games for hybrid consoles.

== Dedicated consoles ==
Title	Developer(s)	Release date			Ref.
Title	Developer(s)	JP	NA	PAL	Ref.
Color TV-Game series
Color TV-Game 6	Nintendo R&D	June 1, 1977	Unreleased	Unreleased	
Color TV-Game 15	Nintendo R&D	June 8, 1977	Unreleased	Unreleased	
Color TV-Game Racing 112	Nintendo R&D2	June 8, 1978	Unreleased	Unreleased	
Color TV-Game Block Kuzushi	Nintendo R&D2	April 23, 1979	Unreleased	Unreleased	
Computer TV-Game	Nintendo R&D2	December 12, 1980	Unreleased	Unreleased	
Classic series
Nintendo Classic Mini: Family Computer	Nintendo PTD	November 10, 2016	Unreleased	Unreleased	
NES Classic Edition	Nintendo PTD	Unreleased	November 11, 2016	November 11, 2016	
Super NES Classic Edition	Nintendo PTD	Unreleased	September 29, 2017	September 29, 2017	
Nintendo Classic Mini: Super Famicom	Nintendo PTD	October 5, 2017	Unreleased	Unreleased	
Nintendo Classic Mini Double Pack	Nintendo PTD	September 15, 2018	Unreleased	Unreleased	
Nintendo Classic Mini: Family Computer Weekly Shōnen Jump 50th Anniversary Version	Nintendo PTD	July 7, 2018	Unreleased	Unreleased	

== NES/Family Computer ==
Licenses owned or co-owned by Nintendo
Title	Developer(s)	Release date			Ref.
Title	Developer(s)	JP	NA	PAL	Ref.
Donkey Kong	Nintendo R&D1, Nintendo R&D2	July 15, 1983	June 1, 1986	October 15, 1986	
Donkey Kong Jr.	Nintendo R&D1, Nintendo R&D2	July 15, 1983	June 1986	1987	
Popeye	Nintendo R&D1, Nintendo R&D2	July 15, 1983	June 1986	1986	
Gomoku Narabe Renju	Nintendo R&D1	August 27, 1983	Unreleased	Unreleased	
Mah-Jong	Nintendo R&D1	August 27, 1983	Unreleased	Unreleased	
Mario Bros.	Nintendo R&D2, Intelligent Systems	September 9, 1983	June 20, 1986	September 1, 1986	
Popeye no Eigo Asobi	Nintendo R&D2	November 22, 1983	Unreleased	Unreleased	
Baseball	Nintendo R&D1	December 7, 1983	October 18, 1985	September 1, 1986	
Donkey Kong Jr. Math	Nintendo R&D2	December 12, 1983	October 18, 1985	1986	
Tennis	Nintendo R&D1, Intelligent Systems	January 14, 1984	October 18, 1985	September 1, 1986	
Pinball	Nintendo R&D1, HAL Laboratory	February 2, 1984	October 18, 1985	September 1, 1986	
Wild Gunman	Nintendo R&D1, Intelligent Systems	February 18, 1984	October 18, 1985	February 15, 1987	
Duck Hunt	Nintendo R&D1, Intelligent Systems	April 21, 1984	October 18, 1985	August 15, 1987	
Golf	Nintendo R&D2, HAL Laboratory	May 1, 1984	October 18, 1985	November 15, 1986	
Hogan's Alley	Nintendo R&D1, Intelligent Systems	June 12, 1984	October 18, 1985	December 15, 1987	
Family BASIC	Nintendo, Hudson Soft, Sharp	June 21, 1984	Unreleased	Unreleased	
Donkey Kong 3	Nintendo R&D1, Intelligent Systems	July 4, 1984	June 23, 1986	September 15, 1987	
Devil World	Nintendo R&D1, Intelligent Systems	October 5, 1984	NSO-only	June 24, 1987	
4 Nin Uchi Mahjong	Hudson Soft	November 2, 1984	Unreleased	Unreleased	
F-1 Race	HAL Laboratory	November 2, 1984	Unreleased	Unreleased	
Urban Champion	Nintendo R&D1	November 14, 1984	August 1986	1986	
Clu Clu Land	Nintendo R&D1	November 22, 1984	October 18, 1985	February 15, 1987	
Excitebike	Nintendo R&D4	November 30, 1984	October 18, 1985	September 1, 1986	
Balloon Fight	Nintendo R&D1, HAL Laboratory	January 22, 1985	June 1986	March 12, 1986	
Ice Climber	Nintendo R&D1	January 30, 1985	October 18, 1985	September 1, 1986	
Family BASIC V3	Nintendo, Hudson Soft, Sharp	February 21, 1985	Unreleased	Unreleased	
Soccer	Intelligent Systems	April 9, 1985	October 18, 1985	January 15, 1987	
Wrecking Crew	Nintendo R&D1	June 18, 1985	October 18, 1985	October 15, 1987	
Kung Fu	Nintendo R&D4	June 21, 1985	October 18, 1985	April 15, 1987	
Stack-Up	Nintendo R&D1	July 26, 1985	October 18, 1985	September 1, 1986	
Gyromite	Nintendo R&D1	August 13, 1985	October 18, 1985	September 1, 1986	
Super Mario Bros.	Nintendo R&D4	September 13, 1985	October 18, 1985	May 15, 1987	
Mach Rider	HAL Laboratory	November 21, 1985	August 1986	March 15, 1987	
Gumshoe	Nintendo R&D1	Unreleased	June 6, 1986	June 15, 1988	
Kid Icarus	Nintendo R&D1, Tose	FDS-only	July 1987	February 15, 1987	
Volleyball	Nintendo R&D3, Pax Softnica	FDS-only	March 1987	November 15, 1987	
Pro Wrestling	Nintendo R&D3	FDS-only	March 1987	September 15, 1987	
Metroid	Nintendo R&D1, Intelligent Systems	FDS-only	August 15, 1987	January 15, 1988	
The Legend of Zelda	Nintendo R&D4	February 19, 1994	August 22, 1987	November 15, 1987	
Mike Tyson's Punch-Out!!	Nintendo R&D3	November 21, 1987	October 1987	December 15, 1987	
Ginga no Sannin	Pax Softnica	December 15, 1987	Unreleased	Unreleased	
Ice Hockey	Nintendo R&D4, Pax Softnica	FDS-only	March 1988	April 15, 1988	
Famicom Wars	Intelligent Systems, Nintendo R&D1	August 12, 1988	Unreleased	Unreleased	
Super Mario Bros. 2	Nintendo R&D4	September 14, 1992	October 9, 1988	April 28, 1989	
Super Mario Bros. 3	Nintendo R&D4	October 23, 1988	February 12, 1990	August 29, 1991	
Zelda II: The Adventure of Link	Nintendo R&D4	FDS-only	December 1, 1988	September 26, 1988	
Mother	Ape, Pax Softnica	July 27, 1989	VC-only (Note: Under the title EarthBound Beginnings.)	VC-only	
To the Earth	Cirque Verte	Unreleased	November 1989	February 23, 1990	
Short Order / Eggsplode!	Tose	Unreleased	December 1989	Unreleased	
Fire Emblem: Shadow Dragon and the Blade of Light	Intelligent Systems, Nintendo R&D1	April 20, 1990	Switch eShop only	Switch eShop only	
Dr. Mario	Nintendo R&D1	July 27, 1990	October 1990	June 27, 1991	
Barker Bill's Trick Shooting	Nintendo R&D1	Unreleased	August 1990	June 27, 1991	
Punch-Out!!	Nintendo R&D3	VC-only	August 1990	1990	
NES Play Action Football	Tose	Unreleased	September 1990	Unreleased	
StarTropics	Nintendo R&D3, Locomotive Corporation	Unreleased	December 1990	August 20, 1992	
Shin 4 Nin Uchi Mahjong: Yakuman Tengoku	Chatnoir	June 28, 1991	Unreleased	Unreleased	
NES Open Tournament Golf	HAL Laboratory, Nintendo R&D2	September 20, 1991	September 1991	June 18, 1992	
Yoshi	Game Freak	December 14, 1991	June 1992	December 10, 1992	
Fire Emblem Gaiden	Intelligent Systems	March 14, 1992	Unreleased	Unreleased	
Yoshi's Cookie	Tose	November 21, 1992	April 1993	1993	
Kirby's Adventure	HAL Laboratory	March 23, 1993	May 1, 1993	September 12, 1993	
Joy Mech Fight	Nintendo R&D1	May 21, 1993	NSO-only	NSO-only	
Mario Bros. (Classic Series)	Nintendo	Unreleased	Unreleased	1993	
Wario's Woods	Nintendo R&D1	February 19, 1994	December 10, 1994	1995	
Zoda's Revenge: StarTropics II	Nintendo R&D3, Locomotive Corporation	Unreleased	March 1994	VC-only	
Event games
Nintendo World Championships 1990	Nintendo, Square	Unreleased	1990	Unreleased	
Nintendo Campus Challenge 1991	Nintendo, Rare	Unreleased	1991	Unreleased	
Prize games
Punch-Out!! (Gold Version)	Nintendo R&D3	September 18, 1987	Unreleased	Unreleased	
Game compilations
Donkey Kong Classics	Nintendo R&D1, Nintendo R&D2	Unreleased	October 1988	August 10, 1989	
Super Mario Bros. / Duck Hunt	Nintendo R&D1, Nintendo R&D4, Intelligent Systems	Unreleased	November 1988	December 1988	
Super Spike V'Ball / World Cup Soccer	Technōs Japan	Unreleased	December 1990	Unreleased	
Super Mario Bros. / Duck Hunt / World Class Track Meet	Nintendo R&D1, Nintendo R&D4, Intelligent Systems, Human Entertainment	Unreleased	December 1990	Unreleased	
Super Mario Bros. / Tetris / Nintendo World Cup	Nintendo R&D1, Nintendo R&D4, Technōs Japan	Unreleased	Unreleased	1992	

Licensed to Nintendo (Worldwide)
Title	Developer(s)	Licensor(s)	Release date			Ref.
Title	Developer(s)	Licensor(s)	JP	NA	PAL	Ref.
Slalom	Rare	Rare	Unreleased	August 1987	October 15, 1987	
R.C. Pro-Am	Rare	Rare	Unreleased	February 28, 1988	April 15, 1988	
Anticipation	Rare	Rare	Unreleased	November 1988	October 25, 1989	
Cobra Triangle	Rare	Rare	Unreleased	July 1, 1989	1989	
Tetris	Nintendo R&D1	Elorg	NSO-only	November 1989	February 23, 1990	
Pin Bot	Rare	Rare, Williams Electronics	Unreleased	April 1990	January 1991	
Snake Rattle 'n' Roll	Rare	Rare	Unreleased	July 1990	March 27, 1991	
Tetris 2	Nintendo R&D1, Tose	Elorg	September 21, 1993	October 1993	1993	

Licensed to Nintendo (original release published by another company)
North America and PAL regions only
Title	Licensor(s)	Release date		Ref.
Title	Licensor(s)	NA	PAL	Ref.
10-Yard Fight	Irem	October 18, 1985	December 6, 1986	
Rad Racer	Square	October 1987	January 15, 1988	
Faxanadu	Hudson Soft	August 31, 1989	December 28, 1990	
Super Spike V'Ball	Technōs Japan	February 1990	January 23, 1992	
Nintendo World Cup	Technōs Japan	December 1990	June 27, 1991	
North America only
Title	Licensor(s)	Release date		Ref.
Title	Licensor(s)	NA		Ref.
World Class Track Meet	Bandai	August 1988		
Super Team Games	Bandai	November 1988		
Dance Aerobics	Bandai	March 1989		
Dragon Warrior	Enix	August 1989		
Final Fantasy	Square	July 12, 1990		
Mega Man 6	Capcom	March 15, 1994		
PAL regions only
Title	Licensor(s)	Release date		Ref.
Title	Licensor(s)	PAL		Ref.
Boulder Dash	Data East	1990		
Kickle Cubicle	Irem	1990		
Burai Fighter	Taxan	1990		
The Guardian Legend	Irem	1990		
Double Dragon	Technos	1990		
Stealth ATF	Activision	May 30, 1991		
The Battle of Olympus	Imagineer	September 26, 1991		
Solar Jetman: Hunt for the Golden Warpship	Tradewest	September 26, 1991		
Solstice: The Quest for the Staff of Demnos	Sony Imagesoft	September 26, 1991		
Little Nemo: The Dream Master	Capcom	December 12, 1991		
Isolated Warrior	VAP	1991		
Low G Man: The Low Gravity Man	Taxan	1991		
A Boy and His Blob: Trouble on Blobolonia	Absolute Entertainment	1991		
Super Off Road	Tradewest	1991		
Kabuki: Quantum Fighter	HAL Laboratory	February 20, 1992		
Mega Man 3	Capcom	February 20, 1992		
The Chessmaster	Hi Tech Expressions	March 26, 1992		
Top Players' Tennis	Asmik	July 1992		
Mega Man 4	Capcom	January 21, 1993		
Battletoads & Double Dragon	Tradewest	October 1993		
Mega Man 5	Capcom	November 18, 1993		
Pac-Man	Namco	1993		
Captain Skyhawk	Milton Bradley Company	May 24, 1994		

Nintendo as distributor only (no involvement in licensing or publishing)
Germany only
Title	Licensor(s)	Release date	Ref.
Title	Licensor(s)	DE	Ref.
Mega Man 2	Capcom	1991	
DuckTales	Capcom	1991	

=== Famicom Disk System ===
Title	Developer(s)	Release date	Ref.
Title	Developer(s)	JP	Ref.
Mahjong	Nintendo R&D1	February 21, 1986	
Baseball	Nintendo R&D1	February 21, 1986	
Tennis	Nintendo R&D1, Intelligent Systems	February 21, 1986	
Golf	Nintendo R&D2, HAL Laboratory	February 21, 1986	
Soccer	Intelligent Systems	February 21, 1986	
Super Mario Bros.	Nintendo R&D4	February 21, 1986	
The Legend of Zelda	Nintendo R&D4	February 21, 1986	
The Mysterious Murasame Castle (Note: Had a North American Virtual Console release.) (Note: Had a PAL Virtual Console release.) (Note: Had a North American and a PAL Nintendo Classics release.)	Nintendo R&D4	April 14, 1986	
Super Mario Bros.: The Lost Levels	Nintendo R&D4	June 3, 1986	
Volleyball	Nintendo R&D3, Pax Softnica	July 21, 1986	
Metroid	Nintendo R&D1, Intelligent Systems	August 6, 1986	
Pro Wrestling	Nintendo R&D3	October 21, 1986	
Kid Icarus	Nintendo R&D1, Tose	December 19, 1986	
Zelda II: The Adventure of Link	Nintendo R&D4	January 14, 1987	
Family Computer Golf: Japan Course	HAL Laboratory	February 21, 1987	
Smash Table Tennis	Konami	May 30, 1987	
Family Computer Golf: U.S. Course	HAL Laboratory	June 14, 1987	
Famicom Mukashibanashi: Shin Onigashima (Disk 1)	Nintendo R&D4, Pax Softnica	September 4, 1987	
Famicom Mukashibanashi: Shin Onigashima (Disk 2)	Nintendo R&D4, Pax Softnica	September 30, 1987	
Famicom Grand Prix: F-1 Race	Nintendo R&D4, HAL Laboratory	October 30, 1987	
Nakayama Miho no Tokimeki High School	Square, Nintendo R&D1	December 1, 1987	
Ice Hockey	Nintendo R&D4, Pax Softnica	January 21, 1988	
Donkey Kong	Nintendo R&D1, Nintendo R&D2	April 8, 1988	
Famicom Grand Prix II: 3D Hot Rally	Nintendo R&D4, HAL Laboratory	April 15, 1988	
Famicom Detective Club: The Missing Heir (Disk 1)	Nintendo R&D1, Tose	April 27, 1988	
Famicom Detective Club: The Missing Heir (Disk 2)	Nintendo R&D1, Tose	June 14, 1988	
Donkey Kong Jr.	Nintendo R&D1, Nintendo R&D2	July 19, 1988	
Vs. Ice Climber	Nintendo R&D1	November 18, 1988	
Kaettekita Mario Bros.	Nintendo R&D4	November 30, 1988	
Vs. Excitebike	Nintendo R&D1, Pax Softnica	December 9, 1988	
Wrecking Crew	Nintendo R&D1	February 3, 1989	
Famicom Detective Club Part II: The Girl Who Stands Behind (Disk 1)	Nintendo R&D1, Tose	May 23, 1989	
Pinball	Nintendo R&D1, HAL Laboratory	May 30, 1989	
Famicom Detective Club Part II: The Girl Who Stands Behind (Disk 2)	Nintendo R&D1, Tose	June 30, 1989	
Famicom Mukashibanashi: Yūyūki (Disk 1)	Nintendo EAD, Pax Softnica	October 14, 1989	
Famicom Mukashibanashi: Yūyūki (Disk 2)	Nintendo EAD, Pax Softnica	November 14, 1989	
Knight Move	JV Dialog	June 5, 1990	
Backgammon	Intelligent Systems	September 7, 1990	
Time Twist: Rekishi no Katasumi de... (Disk 1)	Nintendo EAD, Pax Softnica	July 26, 1991	
Time Twist: Rekishi no Katasumi de... (Disk 2)	Nintendo EAD, Pax Softnica	July 26, 1991	
Vs. Clu Clu Land (Note: Playable in PAL and NA regions through Animal Crossing)	Nintendo R&D1	April 28, 1992	
Prize games
Golf: Japan Course (Professional Course)	HAL Laboratory	1987	
Golf: Japan Course (Champions' Course)	HAL Laboratory	1987	
Golf: Special Course	HAL Laboratory	August 12, 1987	

== Super NES/Super Famicom ==
Licenses owned or co-owned by Nintendo
Title	Developer(s)	Release date			Ref.
Title	Developer(s)	JP	NA	PAL	Ref.
F-Zero	Nintendo EAD	November 21, 1990	August 23, 1991	June 4, 1992	
Super Mario World	Nintendo EAD	November 21, 1990	August 23, 1991	April 11, 1992	
Pilotwings	Nintendo EAD	December 21, 1990	August 23, 1991	1992	
The Legend of Zelda: A Link to the Past	Nintendo EAD	November 21, 1991	April 13, 1992	September 24, 1992	
Super Scope 6	Nintendo R&D1, Intelligent Systems	June 21, 1993	February 1992	October 1992	
Mario Paint	Nintendo R&D1, Intelligent Systems	July 14, 1992	August 17, 1992	December 10, 1992	
Super Mario Kart	Nintendo EAD	August 27, 1992	September 1, 1992	January 21, 1993	
Super Play Action Football	Tose	Unreleased	August 1992	Unreleased	
Battle Clash	Intelligent Systems	June 21, 1993	October 31, 1992	March 18, 1993	
Star Fox	Nintendo EAD, Argonaut Games	February 21, 1993	March 23, 1993	June 3, 1993	
Vegas Stakes (Note: Published by Imagineer in Japan.)	HAL Laboratory	Licensed solely by HAL Laboratory	April 10, 1993	1993	
Super Mario All-Stars	Nintendo EAD	July 14, 1993	August 11, 1993	December 16, 1993	
Yoshi's Safari	Nintendo R&D1	July 14, 1993	September 17, 1993	November 19, 1993	
Mario & Wario	Game Freak	August 27, 1993	NSO-only	NSO-only	
Metal Combat: Falcon's Revenge	Intelligent Systems	Unreleased	December 1993	May 1994	
Fire Emblem: Mystery of the Emblem	Intelligent Systems	January 21, 1994	Unreleased	Unreleased	
Super Metroid	Nintendo R&D1, Intelligent Systems	March 19, 1994	April 18, 1994	July 28, 1994	
Ken Griffey Jr. Presents Major League Baseball	Software Creations	Unreleased	March 1994	Unreleased	
Stunt Race FX	Nintendo EAD, Argonaut Games	June 4, 1994	July 10, 1994	October 27, 1994	
EarthBound	Ape, HAL Laboratory	August 27, 1994	June 5, 1995	VC-only	
Kirby's Dream Course	HAL Laboratory, Nintendo EAD	September 21, 1994	February 1, 1995	August 24, 1995	
Super Punch-Out!!	Nintendo R&D3	Nintendo Power Only	October 24, 1994	January 26, 1995	
Donkey Kong Country	Rare	November 26, 1994	November 21, 1994	November 24, 1994	
Tin Star	Software Creations	Unreleased	November 1994	Unreleased	
Wario's Woods	Intelligent Systems	Unreleased	December 10, 1994	1995	
Tetris & Dr. Mario	Nintendo	Unreleased	December 22, 1994	July 25, 1995	
Uniracers	DMA Design	Unreleased	December 1994	April 27, 1995	
Kirby's Avalanche	Compile, HAL Laboratory	Unreleased	April 25, 1995	February 1, 1995	
Super Mario World 2: Yoshi's Island	Nintendo EAD	August 5, 1995	October 4, 1995	October 6, 1995	
Killer Instinct	Rare	Unreleased	August 30, 1995	September 22, 1995	
Mario's Super Picross	Ape, Jupiter	September 14, 1995	NSO-only	VC-only	
Panel de Pon	Intelligent Systems	October 27, 1995	NSO-only	NSO-only	
Donkey Kong Country 2: Diddy's Kong Quest	Rare	November 21, 1995	December 4, 1995 (Note: Reported US release date varies between November 20 and December 4.)	December 14, 1995	
Super Mario RPG: Legend of the Seven Stars	Square	March 9, 1996	May 13, 1996	VC-only	
Kirby Super Star	HAL Laboratory	March 21, 1996	September 20, 1996	January 23, 1997	
Fire Emblem: Genealogy of the Holy War	Intelligent Systems	May 14, 1996	Unreleased	Unreleased	
Ken Griffey Jr.'s Winning Run	Rare	Unreleased	June 10, 1996	Unreleased	
Tetris Attack	Intelligent Systems	Satellaview Only (Note: Under the title Yoshi no Panepon BS-ban.)	August 11, 1996	November 28, 1996	
Marvelous: Mōhitotsu no Takarajima	Nintendo R&D2	October 26, 1996	Unreleased	Unreleased	
Donkey Kong Country 3: Dixie Kong's Double Trouble!	Rare	November 23, 1996	November 18, 1996	December 13, 1996	
Winter Gold	Funcom Oslo	Unreleased	Unreleased	November 28, 1996	
Itoi Shigesato no Bass Tsuri No. 1	HAL Laboratory	February 21, 1997	Unreleased	Unreleased	
Kirby's Dream Land 3	HAL Laboratory	March 27, 1998	November 27, 1997	VC-only	
Heisei Shin Onigashima: Zenpen	Nintendo, Pax Softnica	May 23, 1998 (Note: First released on Nintendo Power)	Unreleased	Unreleased	
Heisei Shin Onigashima: Kōhen	Nintendo, Pax Softnica	May 23, 1998	Unreleased	Unreleased	
Wrecking Crew '98	Nintendo R&D1, Pax Softnica	May 23, 1998	NSO-only	NSO-only	
Mini-Yonku Let's & Go!! Power WGP 2	Jupiter Corporation	December 4, 1998 (Note: First released on Nintendo Power)	Unreleased	Unreleased	
Kirby no Kirakira Kids	HAL Laboratory	June 25, 1999	NSO-only	NSO-only	
Power Sōkoban	Atelier Double	June 25, 1999	Unreleased	Unreleased	
Sutte Hakkun	indieszero, Nintendo R&D2	June 25, 1999	NSO-only	NSO-only	
Fire Emblem: Thracia 776	Intelligent Systems	January 21, 2000	Unreleased	Unreleased	
Star Fox 2	Nintendo EAD, Argonaut Games	October 5, 2017 (Note: Released only on Super NES Classic Edition & Nintendo Classics.)	September 29, 2017		
Event games
Nintendo Campus Challenge 1992	Nintendo	Unreleased	1992	Unreleased	
Star Fox: Super Weekend	Argonaut, Nintendo	Unreleased	April 30, 1993	May 29, 1993	
Donkey Kong Country: Blockbuster World Video Game Championship II	Rare	Unreleased	November 25, 1994	Unreleased	
Nintendo PowerFest '94	Nintendo, Software Creations	Unreleased	1994	Unreleased	
Game compilations
Super Mario All-Stars + Super Mario World	Nintendo EAD	Unreleased	December 1994	December 1994	
Super Value Double Pak: Super Metroid & The Legend of Zelda: A Link to the Past	Nintendo R&D1, Intelligent Systems, Nintendo EAD	Unreleased	Unreleased	1995	
Big Value Twin Pack: Killer Instinct & F-Zero	Rare, Nintendo EAD	Unreleased	Unreleased	1995	

Licensed to Nintendo (Worldwide)
Title	Developer(s)	Licensor(s)	Release date			Ref.
Title	Developer(s)	Licensor(s)	JP	NA	PAL	Ref.
SimCity	Nintendo EAD	Maxis	April 26, 1991	August 23, 1991	September 24, 1992	
NHL Stanley Cup	Sculptured Software	Sculptured Software	Unreleased	November 1993	1993	
Tetris 2 (Note: Published by Bullet-Proof Software in Japan.)	Tose	Elorg	July 8, 1994	August 1994	1995	
Super International Cricket	Beam Software	Beam Software	Unreleased	Unreleased	July 1995	

Licensed to Nintendo (original release published by another company)
North America and PAL regions only
Title	Licensor(s)	Release date		Ref.
Title	Licensor(s)	NA	PAL	Ref.
Super Tennis	Tonkin House	November 1991	June 4, 1992	
Super Soccer	Human Entertainment	May 1992	June 4, 1992	
NCAA Basketball	HAL Laboratory	October 1992	July 22, 1993	
Illusion of Gaia	Enix	September 26, 1994	April 27, 1995	
Super Pinball: Behind the Mask	Meldac	November 1994	1994	
Street Fighter Alpha 2	Capcom	October 28, 1996	December 19, 1996	
Disney's Pinocchio	Disney	November 1996	November 28, 1996	
Maui Mallard in Cold Shadow	Disney	January 1997	November 28, 1996	
Space Invaders	Taito	November 1997	1997	
Arkanoid: Doh It Again	Taito	November 1997	1997	
PAL regions only
Title	Licensor(s)	Release date		Ref.
Title	Licensor(s)	PAL		Ref.
Super R-Type	Irem	June 4, 1992		
Super Ghouls 'n Ghosts	Capcom	December 10, 1992		
Bubsy in: Claws Encounters of the Furred Kind	Accolade	October 28, 1993		
The Lost Vikings	Interplay	October 28, 1993		
Battletoads in Battlemaniacs	Tradewest	October 1993		
Mystic Quest Legend	Square	October 1993		
Plok!	Tradewest	December 1, 1993		
Nigel Mansell's World Championship Racing	Gremlin Graphics	December 16, 1993		
Pac-Attack	Namco	1993		
Mega Man X	Capcom	August 25, 1994		
Secret of Mana	Square	November 24, 1994		
Super Street Fighter II	Capcom	December 2, 1994		
Soccer Shootout	Capcom	1994		
Pac-Man 2: The New Adventures	Namco	1994		
Kid Klown in Crazy Chase	Kemco	February 1995		
Secret of Evermore	Square	February 22, 1996		
Toy Story	Disney	April 25, 1996		
Terranigma	Enix	December 19, 1996		
Lufia	Taito	1996		
Harvest Moon	Natsume Inc.	January 29, 1998		
Australia only
Title	Licensor(s)	Release date		Ref.
Title	Licensor(s)	AU		Ref.
Super Star Wars	LucasArts	1993		
Only reprint licensed to Nintendo (North America only)
Title	Licensor(s)	Release date		Ref.
Title	Licensor(s)	NA		Ref.
Super Star Wars	LucasArts	1998		
Super Bomberman 2	Hudson Soft	1998		
Only under Player's Choice label (North America only)
Title	Licensor(s)	Release date		Ref.
Title	Licensor(s)	NA		Ref.
Super Star Wars	LucasArts	1996		
Only under Classic Serie label (Note: Also found under the names Nintendo Classics, Golden Hits Collection or Série Classic depending on the country.) (PAL regions only)
Title	Licensor(s)	Release date		Ref.
Title	Licensor(s)	PAL		Ref.
Super Street Fighter II	Capcom	1997		
Super Bomberman 2	Hudson Soft	1998		
Only under Disney's Classic video games label (PAL regions only)
Title	Licensor(s)	Release date		Ref.
Title	Licensor(s)	PAL		Ref.
Disney's Aladdin	Capcom	1998		
Disney's The Jungle Book	Virgin Interactive	1998		
Disney's The Lion King	Virgin Interactive	1998		
Disney's Timon & Pumbaa's Jungle Games	THQ	1998		
The Magical Quest Starring Mickey Mouse	Capcom	1998		
The Great Circus Mystery Starring Mickey & Minnie	Capcom	1998		
Only under Comic Classics label (Germany only)
Title	Licensor(s)	Release date		Ref.
Title	Licensor(s)	DE		Ref.
The Smurfs	Infogrames	1998		
Asterix & Obelix	Infogrames	1998		

Nintendo as distributor only (no involvement in licensing or publishing)
Australia only
Title	Licensor(s)	Release date	Ref.
Title	Licensor(s)	PAL	Ref.
Super Bonk	Hudson Soft	1995	

=== Nintendo Power ===
Licenses owned or co-owned by Nintendo
Title	Developer(s)	Release date	Ref.
Title	Developer(s)	JP	Ref.
F-Zero	Nintendo EAD	September 30, 1997	
Fire Emblem: Monshō no Nazo	Intelligent Systems	September 30, 1997	
Fire Emblem: Seisen no Keifu	Intelligent Systems	September 30, 1997	
Kirby Bowl	HAL Laboratory, Nintendo EAD	September 30, 1997	
Mario no Super Picross	Jupiter, Ape	September 30, 1997	
Mother 2: Gīgu no Gyakushū	HAL Laboratory, Ape	September 30, 1997	
Panel de Pon	Intelligent Systems	September 30, 1997	
Super Donkey Kong	Rare	September 30, 1997	
Super Donkey Kong 2	Rare	September 30, 1997	
Super Donkey Kong 3	Rare	September 30, 1997	
Super Mario Collection	Nintendo EAD	September 30, 1997	
Super Mario World	Nintendo EAD	September 30, 1997	
Super Metroid	Nintendo R&D1, Intelligent Systems	September 30, 1997	
Heisei Shin Onigashima: Kōhen	Pax Softnica	December 1, 1997	
Heisei Shin Onigashima: Zenpen	Pax Softnica	December 1, 1997	
Wrecking Crew '98	Nintendo R&D1, Pax Softnica	January 1, 1998	
Kirby no Kirakira Kizzu	HAL Laboratory	February 1, 1998	
Super Punch-Out!!	Nintendo R&D3	March 1, 1998	
Famicom Tantei Club Part II: Ushiro ni Tatsu Shōjo	Nintendo R&D1	April 1, 1998	
Super Famicom Wars	Intelligent Systems	May 1, 1998	
Dr. Mario	Nintendo R&D1	June 1, 1998	
ZOOtto Mahjong!	Nintendo	July 1, 1998	
Sutte Hakkun	Nintendo R&D2, indieszero	August 1, 1998	
Mini-Yonku Let's & Go!! Power WGP 2	Jupiter	October 1, 1998	
Power Lode Runner	Atelier Double	January 1, 1999	
Power Sōkoban	Atelier Double	January 1, 1999	
Picross NP Vol. 1	Jupiter	April 1, 1999	
Picross NP Vol. 2	Jupiter	June 1, 1999	
Famicom Bunko: Hajimari no Mori	Nintendo R&D1, Pax Softnica	July 1, 1999	
Picross NP Vol. 3	Jupiter	August 1, 1999	
Fire Emblem: Thracia 776	Intelligent Systems	September 1, 1999 (Note: Released pre-installed on a Nintendo Power cartridge and through the standard service.)	
Picross NP Vol. 4	Jupiter	October 1, 1999	
Picross NP Vol. 5	Jupiter	December 1, 1999	
Picross NP Vol. 6	Jupiter	February 1, 2000	
Picross NP Vol. 7	Jupiter	April 1, 2000	
Picross NP Vol. 8	Jupiter	June 1, 2000	
Zelda no Densetsu: Kamigami no Triforce	Nintendo EAD	August 1, 2000	

Licensed to Nintendo (Worldwide)
Title	Developer(s)	Licensor(s)	Release date	Ref.
Title	Developer(s)	Licensor(s)	JP	Ref.
Derby Stallion '98	ParityBit	ParityBit, ASCII	August 25, 1998 (Note: Pre-installed on a Nintendo Power cartridge.)	
Derby Stallion '98	ParityBit	ParityBit, ASCII	September 1, 1998 (Note: Available through the standard service.)	
Metal Slader Glory: Director's Cut	HAL Laboratory	HAL Laboratory, Yoshimiru	November 29, 2000	
Metal Slader Glory: Director's Cut	HAL Laboratory	HAL Laboratory, Yoshimiru	December 1, 2000	

=== Satellaview ===
Title	Developer(s)	Release date	Ref.
Title	Developer(s)	JP	Ref.
BS-X: Sore wa Namae o Nusumareta Machi no Monogatari	Nintendo	April 23, 1995	
Wario no Mori: Bakushō-ban	Nintendo NSD	April 23, 1995	
UNDAKE30 Same Game Daisakusen Mario Version (Note: Had a limited cartridge release by Hudson Soft from January 16, 1995, to February 20, 1995, as a prize in a game tournament.)	Hudson Soft	April 23, 1995	
Tamori no Picross	Jupiter Corporation, Ape Inc.	April 23, 1995 (Note: Update every day from April 23, 1995 to September 2, 1995. In addition to the Easy Picross available at all times, each day introduces a new Daily Picross (今日のピクロス, Kyō no Pikurosu), featuring puzzles released up to 14 days earlier, and every Sunday a new set of Weekly Homework (今週の宿題, Konshū no Shukudai) replaces the previous one.)	
Wario no Mori Event Version Ver. 1	Nintendo NSD	May 18, 1995	
Wario no Mori Event Version Ver. 2	Nintendo NSD	July 20, 1995	
BS Zelda no Densetsu (Episodes 1-4)	Nintendo NSD	August 6, 1995 (Episode 1)	
BS Zelda no Densetsu (Episodes 1-4)	Nintendo NSD	August 13, 1995 (Episode 2)	
BS Zelda no Densetsu (Episodes 1-4)	Nintendo NSD	August 20, 1995 (Episode 3)	
BS Zelda no Densetsu (Episodes 1-4)	Nintendo NSD	August 27, 1995 (Episode 4)	
Panel de Pon Event Version	Nintendo NSD	October 17, 1995	
Konae-chan no DokiDoki Penguin Kazoku	Pax Softnica	November 3, 1995	
BS Zelda no Densetsu Map 2 (Episodes 1-4)	Nintendo NSD	December 30, 1995 (Episode 1)	
BS Zelda no Densetsu Map 2 (Episodes 1-4)	Nintendo NSD	January 1, 1996 (Episode 2)	
BS Zelda no Densetsu Map 2 (Episodes 1-4)	Nintendo NSD	January 3, 1996 (Episode 3)	
BS Zelda no Densetsu Map 2 (Episodes 1-4)	Nintendo NSD	January 5, 1996 (Episode 4)	
Easy Racer	HAL College of Technology & Design	January 6, 1996	
Sweet Honey Action	HAL College of Technology & Design	January 6, 1996	
Puzzle & Bread	HAL College of Technology & Design	January 6, 1996	
FLOWER	HAL College of Technology & Design	January 6, 1996	
Radio Puzzle	HAL College of Technology & Design	January 6, 1996	
Wonderful my race	HAL College of Technology & Design	January 6, 1996	
BS Marvelous: Time Athletics (Courses 1-4)	Nintendo NSD	January 7, 1996 (Course 1)	
BS Marvelous: Time Athletics (Courses 1-4)	Nintendo NSD	January 14, 1996 (Course 2)	
BS Marvelous: Time Athletics (Courses 1-4)	Nintendo NSD	January 21, 1996 (Course 3)	
BS Marvelous: Time Athletics (Courses 1-4)	Nintendo NSD	January 28, 1996 (Course 4)	
Panel de Pon Event Version 2	Nintendo NSD	January 12, 1996	
BS Dragon Quest (Episodes 1-4)	Enix	February 1, 1996 (Episode 1)	
BS Dragon Quest (Episodes 1-4)	Enix	May 6, 1996 (Episode 2)	
BS Dragon Quest (Episodes 1-4)	Enix	May 13, 1996 (Episode 3)	
BS Dragon Quest (Episodes 1-4)	Enix	May 20, 1996 (Episode 4)	
Kirby no Omochabako	HAL Laboratory	February 8, 1996 (Pachinko)	
Kirby no Omochabako	HAL Laboratory	February 8, 1996 (Cannonball)	
Kirby no Omochabako	HAL Laboratory	February 9, 1996 (GuruGuru Ball)	
Kirby no Omochabako	HAL Laboratory	February 9, 1996 (Baseball)	
Kirby no Omochabako	HAL Laboratory	February 10, 1996 (Ball Rally)	
Kirby no Omochabako	HAL Laboratory	February 10, 1996 (Arrange Ball)	
Kirby no Omochabako	HAL Laboratory	February 11, 1996 (Pinball)	
Kirby no Omochabako	HAL Laboratory	February 11, 1996 (Hoshi Kuzushi)	
Kirby no Omochabako	HAL Laboratory	February 22, 1996 (Setsuna no Mikiri)	
Kirby no Omochabako	HAL Laboratory	February 22, 1996 (Kachiwari Megaton Punch)	
BS Super Mario USA Power Challenge (Episodes 1-4)	Nintendo NSD	March 31, 1996 (Episode 1)	
BS Super Mario USA Power Challenge (Episodes 1-4)	Nintendo NSD	April 7, 1996 (Episode 2)	
BS Super Mario USA Power Challenge (Episodes 1-4)	Nintendo NSD	April 14, 1996 (Episode 3)	
BS Super Mario USA Power Challenge (Episodes 1-4)	Nintendo NSD	April 21, 1996 (Episode 4)	
BS Fūrai no Shiren: Surara wo Sukue (Weeks 1-4)	Enix	April 28, 1996 (Week 1)	
BS Fūrai no Shiren: Surara wo Sukue (Weeks 1-4)	Enix	May 5, 1996 (Week 2)	
BS Fūrai no Shiren: Surara wo Sukue (Weeks 1-4)	Enix	May 12, 1996 (Week 3)	
BS Fūrai no Shiren: Surara wo Sukue (Weeks 1-4)	Enix	May 19, 1996 (Week 4)	
BS SimCity: Machi Tsukuri Taikai (Scenarios 1-4)	Nintendo NSD	August 4, 1996 (Scenario 1)	
BS SimCity: Machi Tsukuri Taikai (Scenarios 1-4)	Nintendo NSD	August 11, 1996 (Scenario 2)	
BS SimCity: Machi Tsukuri Taikai (Scenarios 1-4)	Nintendo NSD	August 18, 1996 (Scenario 3)	
BS SimCity: Machi Tsukuri Taikai (Scenarios 1-4)	Nintendo NSD	August 25, 1996 (Scenario 4)	
BS Shin Onigashima (Episodes 1-4)	Nintendo NSD	September 29, 1996 (Episode 1)	
BS Shin Onigashima (Episodes 1-4)	Nintendo NSD	October 6, 1996 (Episode 2)	
BS Shin Onigashima (Episodes 1-4)	Nintendo NSD	October 13, 1996 (Episode 3)	
BS Shin Onigashima (Episodes 1-4)	Nintendo NSD	October 20, 1996 (Episode 4)	
Yoshi no Panepon BS-ban	Intelligent Systems	November 3, 1996	
BS Marvelous: Camp Arnold (Courses 1-4)	Nintendo NSD	November 3, 1996 (Course 1)	
BS Marvelous: Camp Arnold (Courses 1-4)	Nintendo NSD	November 10, 1996 (Course 2)	
BS Marvelous: Camp Arnold (Courses 1-4)	Nintendo NSD	November 17, 1996 (Course 3)	
BS Marvelous: Camp Arnold (Courses 1-4)	Nintendo NSD	November 24, 1996 (Course 4)	
Special Tee Shot	HAL Laboratory	December 1, 1996	
BS F-Zero Grand Prix (Weeks 1-4)	Nintendo NSD	December 29, 1996 (Week 1 Knight)	
BS F-Zero Grand Prix (Weeks 1-4)	Nintendo NSD	January 5, 1997 (Week 2 Queen)	
BS F-Zero Grand Prix (Weeks 1-4)	Nintendo NSD	January 12, 1997 (Week 3 King)	
BS F-Zero Grand Prix (Weeks 1-4)	Nintendo NSD	January 19, 1997 (Week 4 Ace)	
BS Tantei Club: Yuki ni Kieta Kako (Parts 1-3)	Pax Softnica	February 9, 1997 (Part 1)	
BS Tantei Club: Yuki ni Kieta Kako (Parts 1-3)	Pax Softnica	February 16, 1997 (Part 2)	
BS Tantei Club: Yuki ni Kieta Kako (Parts 1-3)	Pax Softnica	February 23, 1997 (Part 3)	
Zelda no Densetsu: Kamigami no Triforce	Nintendo NSD	March 2, 1997	
Dr. Mario BS-ban	Nintendo NSD	March 30, 1997	
BS Zelda no Densetsu: Inishie no Sekiban (Episodes 1-4)	Nintendo NSD	March 30, 1997 (Episode 1)	
BS Zelda no Densetsu: Inishie no Sekiban (Episodes 1-4)	Nintendo NSD	April 6, 1997 (Episode 2)	
BS Zelda no Densetsu: Inishie no Sekiban (Episodes 1-4)	Nintendo NSD	April 13, 1997 (Episode 3)	
BS Zelda no Densetsu: Inishie no Sekiban (Episodes 1-4)	Nintendo NSD	April 20, 1997 (Episode 4)	
Bass Tsuri No.1 Haru Yosen no Zenkoku Tournament	HAL Laboratory	April 27, 1997	
Excitebike: Bun Bun Mario Battle (Stadiums 1 - 4)	Nintendo NSD	May 11, 1997 (Stadium 1)	
Excitebike: Bun Bun Mario Battle (Stadiums 1 - 4)	Nintendo NSD	May 18, 1997 (Stadium 2)	
Excitebike: Bun Bun Mario Battle (Stadiums 1 - 4)	Nintendo NSD	November 2, 1997 (Stadium 3)	
Excitebike: Bun Bun Mario Battle (Stadiums 1 - 4)	Nintendo NSD	November 9, 1997 (Stadium 4)	
Bass Tsuri No.1 Haru Kesshō Fuyu no Zenkoku Tournament	HAL Laboratory	May 25, 1997	
BS F-Zero 2 Practice	Nintendo NSD	June 1, 1997	
R no Shosai (Weeks 1-2)	Nintendo NSD	June 1, 1997 (Week 1)	
R no Shosai (Weeks 1-2)	Nintendo NSD	June 8, 1997 (Week 2)	
Bakushō Mondai no Totsugeki Star Pirates (Editions 1-4)	Unknown	June 22, 1997 (Edition 1)	
Bakushō Mondai no Totsugeki Star Pirates (Editions 1-4)	Unknown	July 27, 1997 (Edition 2)	
Bakushō Mondai no Totsugeki Star Pirates (Editions 1-4)	Unknown	August 31, 1997 (Edition 3)	
Bakushō Mondai no Totsugeki Star Pirates (Editions 1-4)	Unknown	September 21, 1997 (Edition 4)	
Satella Walker	Nintendo NSD	June 29, 1997 (Sate-bō o Sukuidase!)	
Satella Walker	Nintendo NSD	July 6, 1997 (Machi no Heiwa o Torimodose!)	
Mario Paint BS-ban	Nintendo NSD	August 3, 1997	
BS F-Zero Grand Prix 2 (Weeks 1-2)	Nintendo NSD	August 10, 1997 (Week 1)	
BS F-Zero Grand Prix 2 (Weeks 1-2)	Nintendo NSD	August 17, 1997 (Week 2)	
Bass Tsuri No.1 Natsu no Zenkoku Tournament	HAL Laboratory	August 24, 1997	
Kodomo Chōsadan Mighty Pockets (Investigations 1-3)	Nintendo	September 7, 1997 (Investigation 1)	
Kodomo Chōsadan Mighty Pockets (Investigations 1-3)	Nintendo	September 14, 1997 (Investigation 2)	
Kodomo Chōsadan Mighty Pockets (Investigations 1-3)	Nintendo	March 22, 1998 (Investigation 3)	
Wario no Mori: Futatabi	Nintendo NSD	September 28, 1997	
BS Fire Emblem: Akaneia Senki-hen (Episodes 1 - 4)	Intelligent Systems	September 28, 1997 (Episode 1: Palace Kanraku)	
BS Fire Emblem: Akaneia Senki-hen (Episodes 1 - 4)	Intelligent Systems	October 5, 1997 (Episode 2: Akai Ryūkishi)	
BS Fire Emblem: Akaneia Senki-hen (Episodes 1 - 4)	Intelligent Systems	October 12, 1997 (Episode 3: Seigi no Tōzokudan)	
BS Fire Emblem: Akaneia Senki-hen (Episodes 1 - 4)	Intelligent Systems	October 19, 1997 (Episode 4: Hajimari no Toki)	
Sutte Hakkun Event Version	Nintendo NSD	November 2, 1997	
Bass Tsuri No.1 Aki no Zenkoku Tournament	HAL Laboratory	November 23, 1997	
Satella de Picross	Jupiter Corporation	November 30, 1997	
R no Shosai Dai-2-maku (Weeks 1-2)	Nintendo NSD	November 30, 1997 (Week 1)	
R no Shosai Dai-2-maku (Weeks 1-2)	Nintendo NSD	December 7, 1997 (Week 2)	
Panel de Pon Event '98	Intelligent Systems	December 28, 1997	
BS Super Mario Collection (Weeks 1-4)	Nintendo NSD	December 28, 1997 (Week 1)	
BS Super Mario Collection (Weeks 1-4)	Nintendo NSD	January 4, 1998 (Week 2)	
BS Super Mario Collection (Weeks 1-4)	Nintendo NSD	January 11, 1998 (Week 3)	
BS Super Mario Collection (Weeks 1-4)	Nintendo NSD	January 18, 1998 (Week 4)	
Mario Paint Yūshō Naizō-ban	Nintendo NSD	December 28, 1997	
Oryōri Pon!	indieszero	November 30, 1997 (November issue)	
Oryōri Pon!	indieszero	December 1997 (December issue)	
Oryōri Pon!	indieszero	January 1998 (January issue)	
Oryōri Pon!	indieszero	February 1998 (February issue)	
Satella Walker 2	Nintendo NSD	February 15, 1998 (Mokumoku Kemuri Panic)	
Satella Walker 2	Nintendo NSD	February 22, 1998 (Bottom de Batoru)	
Bass Tsuri No.1 Fuyu no Zenkoku Tournament	HAL Laboratory	February 22, 1998	
Super Famicom Wars BS-ban	Intelligent Systems	March 1, 1998 (Soramamejima)	
Super Famicom Wars BS-ban	Intelligent Systems	March 8, 1998 (Hagoromojima)	
Super Famicom Wars BS-ban	Intelligent Systems	March 15, 1998 (Noakazantou)	
Super Famicom Wars BS-ban	Intelligent Systems	March 22, 1998 (Tsukinowajima)	
ZOOtto Mahjong! Preview-ban	Nintendo NSD	June 14, 1998	
ZOOtto Mahjong! Event-ban	Nintendo NSD	July 19, 1998	
Sutte Hakkun BS-ban 2	Nintendo NSD	October 4, 1998	
BS Sutte Hakkun '98 Fuyu Event Version	Nintendo NSD	December 20, 1998	

== Nintendo 64 ==
Licenses owned or co-owned by Nintendo
Title	Developer(s)	Release date			Ref.
Title	Developer(s)	JP	NA	PAL	Ref.
Pilotwings 64	Nintendo EAD, Nintendo R&D3, Paradigm Entertainment	June 23, 1996	September 29, 1996	March 1, 1997	
Super Mario 64	Nintendo EAD	June 23, 1996	September 29, 1996	March 1, 1997	
Wave Race 64	Nintendo EAD	September 27, 1996	November 1, 1996	April 29, 1997	
Killer Instinct Gold	Rare	Unreleased	November 25, 1996	July 4, 1997	
Cruis'n USA	Leland Interactive Media	Unreleased	December 3, 1996	April 12, 1998	
Mario Kart 64	Nintendo EAD	December 14, 1996	February 10, 1997	June 24, 1997	
Blast Corps	Rare	March 21, 1997	February 28, 1997	December 22, 1997	
Star Fox 64	Nintendo EAD	April 27, 1997	July 1, 1997	October 20, 1997	
Super Mario 64 Shindō Pack Taiō Version	Nintendo EAD	July 18, 1997	Unreleased	Unreleased	
Wave Race 64 Shindō Pack Taiō Version	Nintendo EAD	July 18, 1997	Unreleased	Unreleased	
GoldenEye 007	Rare	August 23, 1997	August 25, 1997	August 25, 1997	
Yoshi's Story	Nintendo EAD	December 21, 1997	March 1, 1998	May 10, 1998	
1080° Snowboarding	Nintendo EAD	February 28, 1998	March 31, 1998	October 9, 1998	
Kobe Bryant in NBA Courtside	Left Field Productions	Unreleased	April 1, 1998	June 10, 1998	
Major League Baseball Featuring Ken Griffey, Jr.	Angel Studios	Unreleased	May 31, 1998	1998 (Note: PAL version only released in Australia.)	
Cruis'n World	Eurocom	Unreleased	September 28, 1998	June 25, 1998	
Banjo-Kazooie	Rare	December 6, 1998	June 29, 1998	July 17, 1998	
F-Zero X	Nintendo EAD	July 14, 1998	September 30, 1998	November 6, 1998	
Pocket Monsters Stadium	Nintendo EAD	August 1, 1998	Unreleased	Unreleased	
The Legend of Zelda: Ocarina of Time	Nintendo EAD	November 21, 1998	November 23, 1998	December 11, 1998	
Hey You, Pikachu!	Ambrella	December 12, 1998	November 6, 2000	Unreleased	
Mario Party	Hudson Soft	December 18, 1998	February 8, 1999	March 9, 1999	
Super Smash Bros.	HAL Laboratory	January 21, 1999	April 26, 1999	November 19, 1999	
Pokémon Snap	HAL Laboratory; Pax Softnica	March 21, 1999	June 30, 1999	September 15, 2000	
Pokémon Stadium	Nintendo EAD	April 30, 1999	February 29, 2000	April 7, 2000	
Ken Griffey, Jr.'s Slugfest	Angel Studios	Unreleased	May 10, 1999	Unreleased	
Mario Golf	Camelot Software Planning	June 11, 1999	June 30, 1999	September 14, 1999	
Ogre Battle 64: Person of Lordly Caliber (Note: Licensed to and published in North America by Atlus, and later by Square Enix for the Western Virtual Console release.)	Quest	July 14, 1999	October 7, 2000	VC-only	
NBA Courtside 2: Featuring Kobe Bryant	Left Field Productions	Unreleased	November 8, 1999	Unreleased	
Donkey Kong 64	Rare	December 10, 1999	November 24, 1999	December 6, 1999	
Custom Robo	Noise	December 8, 1999	Unreleased	Unreleased	
Mario Party 2	Hudson Soft	December 17, 1999	January 24, 2000	October 13, 2000	
Kirby 64: The Crystal Shards	HAL Laboratory	March 24, 2000	June 26, 2000	June 22, 2001	
Shigesato Itoi's No. 1 Bass Fishing	Dice	March 31, 2000	Unreleased	Unreleased	
The Legend of Zelda: Majora's Mask	Nintendo EAD	April 27, 2000	October 25, 2000	November 17, 2000	
Excitebike 64	Left Field Productions	June 23, 2000	April 30, 2000	June 8, 2001	
StarCraft 64	Blizzard Entertainment, Mass Media Inc.	Unreleased	June 12, 2000	May 25, 2001	
Mario Tennis	Camelot Software Planning	July 21, 2000	August 28, 2000	November 3, 2000	
Paper Mario	Intelligent Systems	August 11, 2000	February 5, 2001	October 5, 2001	
Pokémon Puzzle League	Nintendo Software Technology	Unreleased	September 1, 2000	March 16, 2001	
Custom Robo V2	Noise	November 10, 2000	Unreleased	Unreleased	
Banjo-Tooie	Rare	November 27, 2000	November 20, 2000	April 12, 2001	
Sin & Punishment	Treasure, Nintendo R&D1	November 21, 2000	VC-only	VC-only	
Mario Party 3	Hudson Soft	December 7, 2000	May 6, 2001	November 16, 2001	
Pokémon Stadium 2	Nintendo EAD	December 14, 2000	March 28, 2001	October 19, 2001	
Dr. Mario 64	Nintendo R&D1	Unreleased	April 8, 2001	NSO-only	
Dōbutsu no Mori	Nintendo EAD	April 14, 2001	Unreleased	Unreleased	

Rare-published titles (Note: Rare was partially owned by Nintendo (49%) during this period, and its games typically displayed the Nintendo logo at startup.)
Title	Developer(s)	Release date			Ref.
Title	Developer(s)	JP	NA	PAL	Ref.
Diddy Kong Racing (Note: Published by Rare and distributed exclusively by Nintendo Worldwide.)	Rare	November 21, 1997	November 24, 1997	November 21, 1997	
Jet Force Gemini	Rare	December 1, 1999	October 11, 1999	October 29, 1999	
Perfect Dark	Rare	October 21, 2000	May 22, 2000	June 30, 2000	
Conker's Bad Fur Day (Note: Published by Rare and distributed exclusively by Nintendo in North America and Australia, and published by THQ in PAL regions.)	Rare	Unreleased	March 5, 2001	April 6, 2001	

Licensed to Nintendo (Worldwide)
Title	Developer(s)	Licensor(s)	Release date			Ref.
Title	Developer(s)	Licensor(s)	JP	NA	PAL	Ref.
Star Wars: Shadows of the Empire	LucasArts	Lucasfilm	June 14, 1997	December 3, 1996	March 1, 1997	
Tetrisphere	H2O Entertainment	The Tetris Company	Unreleased	August 11, 1997	February 1998	
Waialae Country Club: True Golf Classics	T&E Soft	T&E Soft	Unreleased	July 29, 1998	August 24, 1998	
Command & Conquer	Looking Glass Studios	Electronic Arts	Unreleased	May 31, 1999	July 30, 1999	
The New Tetris	H2O Entertainment, Blue Planet Software	Elorg	Unreleased	July 31, 1999	October 15, 1999	
Ridge Racer 64	Nintendo Software Technology	Namco	NSO-only	February 14, 2000	July 4, 2000	
Shiren the Wanderer 2	Chunsoft	Chunsoft, Kōichi Sugiyama	September 27, 2000	Unreleased	Unreleased	
Mickey's Speedway USA	Rare	Disney	January 21, 2001	November 13, 2000	December 1, 2000	

Licensed to Nintendo (original release published by another company)
North America and PAL regions only
Title	Licensor(s)	Release date		Ref.
Title	Licensor(s)	NA	PAL	Ref.
Mischief Makers	Enix	October 1, 1997	December 1, 1997	
Bomberman 64	Hudson Soft	November 30, 1997	November 1, 1997	
Bomberman Hero	Hudson Soft	September 1, 1998	October 1, 1998	
PAL regions only
Title	Licensor(s)	Release date		Ref.
Title	Licensor(s)	PAL		Ref.
Snowboard Kids	Atlus	March 16, 1998		
Glover	Hasbro Interactive	November 24, 1998		

Distributed exclusively by Nintendo label
Title	Publisher / Licensor(s)	Release date			Ref.
Title	Publisher / Licensor(s)	JP	NA	PAL	Ref.
Diddy Kong Racing	Rare	November 21, 1997	November 24, 1997	November 21, 1997	
F-1 World Grand Prix	Video System	December 18, 1998	July 27, 1998	September 14, 1998	
Star Wars: Rogue Squadron	LucasArts	August 27, 1999	December 8, 1998	January 10, 1999	
Star Wars Episode I: Racer	LucasArts	July 21, 1999	May 18, 1999	June 4, 1999	
F-1 World Grand Prix II	Video System	Unreleased	Unreleased	July 2, 1999	
Jet Force Gemini	Rare	December 1, 1999	October 11, 1999	October 29, 1999	
Perfect Dark	Rare	October 21, 2000	May 22, 2000	June 30, 2000	
Conker's Bad Fur Day	Rare	Unreleased	March 5, 2001	No label for the PAL release	

Nintendo as distributor only (no involvement in licensing or publishing)
PAL regions only
Title	Licensor(s)	Release date	Ref.
Title	Licensor(s)	PAL	Ref.
NBA Hangtime	Midway Games	September 1, 1997	
Australia only
Title	Licensor(s)	Release date	Ref.
Title	Licensor(s)	PAL	Ref.
Top Gear Rally	Kemco	1997	
AeroGauge	ASCII Entertainment	1998	
Air Boarder 64	Gaga Interactive Media	1998	
Dual Heroes	Gaga Interactive Media	1998	
Knife Edge: Nose Gunner	Kemco	1998	
Snowboard Kids 2	Atlus	April 30, 1999	
Top Gear Overdrive	Kemco	1999	
Germany only
Title	Licensor(s)	Release date	Ref.
Title	Licensor(s)	DE	Ref.
Wayne Gretzky's 3D Hockey	Midway Games	March 1, 1997	

=== 64DD ===
Licenses owned or co-owned by Nintendo
Title	Developer(s)	Release date	Ref.
Title	Developer(s)	JP	Ref.
Mario Artist: Paint Studio	Nintendo EAD, Software Creations	December 11, 1999	
Mario Artist: Talent Studio	Nintendo EAD	February 23, 2000	
SimCity 64	HAL Laboratory	February 23, 2000	
F-Zero X: Expansion Kit	Nintendo EAD	April 21, 2000	
Mario Artist: Communication Kit	Nintendo EAD	June 29, 2000	
Mario Artist: Polygon Studio	Nintendo EAD, Nichimen Graphics	August 29, 2000	

RandnetDD-published titles (Note: RandnetDD was a joint venture between Nintendo and Recruit.)
Title	Developer(s)	Release date
Title	Developer(s)	JP
Kyojin no Doshin	Marigul Management, Param	December 11, 1999
Randnet Disk	RandnetDD	February 23, 2000
Kyojin no Doshin Kaihō Sensen Chibikko Chikko Daishūgō	Param	May 17, 2000

== GameCube ==
Licenses owned or co-owned by Nintendo
Title	Developer(s)	Release date			Ref.
Title	Developer(s)	JP	NA	PAL	Ref.
Luigi's Mansion	Nintendo EAD	September 14, 2001	November 18, 2001	May 3, 2002	
Wave Race: Blue Storm	Nintendo Software Technology	September 14, 2001	November 18, 2001	May 3, 2002	
Pikmin	Nintendo EAD	October 26, 2001	December 2, 2001	June 14, 2002	
Super Smash Bros. Melee	HAL Laboratory	November 21, 2001	December 3, 2001	May 24, 2002	
Animal Crossing	Nintendo EAD	December 14, 2001	September 15, 2002	September 24, 2004	
Cubivore: Survival of the Fittest	Saru Brunei, Intelligent Systems	February 21, 2002	Licensed solely by Saru Brunei	Unreleased	
Doshin the Giant	Param	March 14, 2002	Unreleased	September 20, 2002	
NBA Courtside 2002	Left Field Productions	March 29, 2002	January 13, 2002	May 24, 2002	
Eternal Darkness: Sanity's Requiem	Silicon Knights	October 25, 2002	June 23, 2002	November 1, 2002	
Super Mario Sunshine	Nintendo EAD	July 19, 2002	August 26, 2002	October 4, 2002	
Star Fox Adventures	Rare Ltd.	September 27, 2002	September 23, 2002	November 22, 2002	
Mario Party 4	Hudson Soft	November 8, 2002	October 21, 2002	November 29, 2002	
Metroid Prime	Retro Studios	February 28, 2003	November 17, 2002	March 21, 2003	
The Legend of Zelda: Ocarina of Time / Master Quest (Note: Pre-order bonus for The Legend of Zelda: The Wind Waker.)	Nintendo EAD; Nintendo Software Technology	November 28, 2002	February 17, 2003	Compilation only	
The Legend of Zelda: The Wind Waker	Nintendo EAD	December 13, 2002	March 24, 2003	May 2, 2003	
Nintendo Puzzle Collection	Nintendo Software Technology	February 7, 2003	Unreleased	Unreleased	
Giftpia	skip Ltd.	April 25, 2003	Unreleased	Unreleased	
Wario World	Treasure	May 27, 2004	June 23, 2003	June 20, 2003	
Pokémon Box: Ruby and Sapphire (Note: Published by The Pokémon Company in Japan.)	Nintendo EAD, Game Freak	May 30, 2003	July 11, 2004	May 14, 2004	
Dōbutsu no Mori e+	Nintendo EAD	June 27, 2003	Unreleased	Unreleased	
Kirby Air Ride	HAL Laboratory	July 11, 2003	October 13, 2003	February 27, 2004	
Pokémon Channel	Ambrella	July 18, 2003	December 1, 2003	April 2, 2004	
F-Zero GX	Amusement Vision	July 25, 2003	August 25, 2003	October 31, 2003	
Mario Golf: Toadstool Tour	Camelot Software Planning	September 5, 2003	July 28, 2003	June 18, 2004	
WarioWare, Inc.: Mega Party Game$!	Nintendo R&D1, Intelligent Systems	October 17, 2003	April 5, 2004	September 3, 2004	
Mario Kart: Double Dash!!	Nintendo EAD	November 7, 2003	November 17, 2003	November 14, 2003	
Mario Party 5	Hudson Soft	November 28, 2003	November 10, 2003	December 5, 2003	
The Legend of Zelda: Collector's Edition (Note: Released as a promotional disc: in Japan through Club Nintendo for the release of The Legend of Zelda: Four Swords Adventures; in North America bundled with the GameCube, or obtained by subscribing to Nintendo Power or registering a GameCube and selected games; in Europe initially included in the GameCube + Mario Kart: Double Dash!! bundle, and later offered through Club Nintendo; in the UK and Australia available by providing proof of purchase for select GameCube titles.)	Nintendo EAD; Nintendo Software Technology	March 18, 2004	November 17, 2003	November 14, 2003	
Pokémon Colosseum	Genius Sonority	November 21, 2003	March 22, 2004	May 14, 2004	
Pac-Man Vs. (Note: The publisher of the game is unclear due to its unconventional release. Namco distributed the title through game bundles, including R: Racing Evolution in the North American, PAL, and Japanese regions, and Pac-Man World 2 exclusively in North America. In Japan, Nintendo also distributed the game as a limited-time bonus for Club Nintendo members. The game was later re-released on the Nintendo DS and Nintendo Switch as part of the Namco Museum compilations, which were fully published by Namco.)	Nintendo EAD	November 27, 2003	December 2, 2003	April 2, 2004	
1080° Avalanche	Nintendo Software Technology	January 22, 2004	December 1, 2003	November 28, 2003	
Donkey Konga	Namco	December 12, 2003	September 27, 2004	October 15, 2004	
Custom Robo	Noise, Nintendo	March 4, 2004	May 10, 2004	Unreleased	
The Legend of Zelda: Four Swords Adventures	Nintendo EAD	March 18, 2004	June 7, 2004	January 7, 2005	
Pikmin 2	Nintendo EAD	April 29, 2004	August 30, 2004	October 8, 2004	
Legend of Golfer (Note: Published by Seta Corporation and distributed by Nintendo.)	Seta Corporation	June 17, 2004	Unreleased	Unreleased	
Donkey Konga 2	Namco	July 1, 2004	May 9, 2005	June 3, 2005	
Paper Mario: The Thousand-Year Door	Intelligent Systems	July 22, 2004	October 11, 2004	November 12, 2004	
Kururin Squash	Eighting	October 14, 2004	Unreleased	Unreleased	
Mario Power Tennis	Camelot Software Planning	October 28, 2004	November 8, 2004	February 25, 2005	
Metroid Prime 2: Echoes	Retro Studios	May 26, 2005	November 15, 2004	November 26, 2004	
Mario Party 6	Hudson Soft	November 18, 2004	December 6, 2004	March 18, 2005	
Donkey Kong Jungle Beat	Nintendo EAD Tokyo	December 16, 2004	March 14, 2005	February 4, 2005	
Star Fox: Assault	Namco	February 24, 2005	February 14, 2005	April 29, 2005	
Donkey Konga 3	Namco	March 17, 2005	Unreleased	Unreleased	
Fire Emblem: Path of Radiance	Intelligent Systems	April 20, 2005	October 17, 2005	November 4, 2005	
Chibi-Robo!	skip Ltd.	June 23, 2005	February 8, 2006	May 26, 2006	
Dance Dance Revolution Mario Mix (Note: Released as Dancing Stage Mario Mix in PAL regions.)	Konami	July 14, 2005	October 24, 2005	October 28, 2005	
Mario Superstar Baseball	Namco	July 21, 2005	August 29, 2005	November 11, 2005	
Pokémon XD: Gale of Darkness	Genius Sonority	August 4, 2005	October 3, 2005	November 18, 2005	
Geist	n-Space	Unreleased	August 15, 2005	October 7, 2005	
Battalion Wars	Kuju Entertainment	October 27, 2005	September 19, 2005	December 9, 2005	
Mario Party 7	Hudson Soft	November 10, 2005	November 7, 2005	February 10, 2006	
Super Mario Strikers (Note: Released as Mario Smash Football in PAL regions.)	Next Level Games	January 19, 2006	December 5, 2005	November 18, 2005	
Densetsu no Quiz Ō Ketteisen	Nintendo	December 8, 2005	Unreleased	Unreleased	
Odama	Vivarium	April 13, 2006	April 10, 2006	March 31, 2006	
The Legend of Zelda: Twilight Princess	Nintendo EAD	December 2, 2006	December 11, 2006	December 15, 2006	
Game compilations
The Legend of Zelda: The Wind Waker / The Legend of Zelda: Ocarina of Time / Master Quest (Note: Released as The Legend of Zelda: The Wind Waker Limited Edition in PAL regions.)	Nintendo EAD, Nintendo Software Technology	Unreleased	2003	May 2, 2003	
The Legend of Zelda: The Wind Waker / Metroid Prime	Nintendo EAD, Retro Studios	Unreleased	2005	Unreleased	

Licensed to Nintendo (Worldwide)
Title	Developer(s)	Licensor(s)	Release date		
Title	Developer(s)	Licensor(s)	JP	NA	PAL
Disney's Magical Mirror Starring Mickey Mouse	Capcom	Disney	August 9, 2002	August 13, 2002	September 13, 2002
Baten Kaitos Origins	Monolith Soft	Bandai Namco	February 23, 2006	September 25, 2006	Unreleased

Licensed to Nintendo (original release published by another company)
North America and PAL regions only
Title	Licensor(s)	Release date	
Title	Licensor(s)	NA	PAL
Final Fantasy Crystal Chronicles	Square Enix	February 9, 2004	March 12, 2004

Nintendo as distributor only (no involvement in licensing or publishing)
PAL regions only
Title	Licensor(s)	Release date	Ref.
Title	Licensor(s)	PAL	Ref.
SoulCalibur II	Namco	September 26, 2003	
Tales of Symphonia	Namco	November 19, 2004	
Street Racing Syndicate	Namco	March 4, 2005	
Resident Evil 4	Capcom	March 18, 2005	
Viewtiful Joe: Red Hot Rumble	Capcom	February 24, 2006	
Baten Kaitos: Eternal Wings and the Lost Ocean	Namco	April 1, 2005	
Naruto: Clash of Ninja European Version	Tomy	November 24, 2006	

== Wii ==
Licenses owned or co-owned by Nintendo
Title	Developer(s)	Release date			Ref.
Title	Developer(s)	JP	NA	PAL	Ref.
Wii Sports	Nintendo EAD	December 2, 2006	November 19, 2006	December 8, 2006	
The Legend of Zelda: Twilight Princess	Nintendo EAD	December 2, 2006	November 19, 2006	December 8, 2006	
Excite Truck	Monster Games; Nintendo SPD	January 18, 2007	November 19, 2006	February 16, 2007	
Wii Play	Nintendo EAD	December 2, 2006	February 12, 2007	December 8, 2006	
WarioWare: Smooth Moves	Intelligent Systems; Nintendo SPD	December 2, 2006	January 15, 2007	January 12, 2007	
Pokémon Battle Revolution (Note: Published by The Pokémon Company in Japan.)	Genius Sonority	December 14, 2006	June 25, 2007	December 7, 2007	
Fire Emblem: Radiant Dawn	Intelligent Systems	February 22, 2007	November 5, 2007	March 14, 2008	
Eyeshield 21: The Field's Greatest Warriors	Eighting	March 8, 2007	Unreleased	Unreleased	
Super Paper Mario	Intelligent Systems	April 19, 2007	April 4, 2007	September 14, 2007	
Big Brain Academy: Wii Degree (Note: Released as Big Brain Academy for Wii in PAL regions.)	Nintendo EAD	April 26, 2007	June 11, 2007	July 20, 2007	
Mario Strikers Charged (Note: Released as Mario Strikers Charged Football in PAL regions.)	Next Level Games	September 20, 2007	July 30, 2007	May 25, 2007	
Mario Party 8	Hudson Soft	July 26, 2007	May 29, 2007	June 22, 2007	
Donkey Kong Barrel Blast (Note: Released as Donkey Kong Jet Race in PAL regions.)	Paon	June 28, 2007	October 8, 2007	February 25, 2008	
Endless Ocean	Arika	August 2, 2007	January 21, 2008	November 9, 2007	
Metroid Prime 3: Corruption	Retro Studios	March 6, 2008	August 27, 2007	October 26, 2007	
Battalion Wars 2	Kuju Entertainment	May 15, 2008	October 29, 2007	February 19, 2008	
Super Mario Galaxy	Nintendo EAD Tokyo	November 1, 2007	November 12, 2007	November 16, 2007	
Mario & Sonic at the Olympic Games (Note: Primarily produced by Sega, Published by Nintendo only in Japan.)	Sega Sports R&D	November 22, 2007	November 6, 2007	November 23, 2007	
Link's Crossbow Training	Nintendo EAD	May 1, 2008	November 19, 2007	December 7, 2007	
Wii Fit	Nintendo EAD	December 1, 2007	May 19, 2008	April 25, 2008	
Wii Chess (Note: This game was released in Japan only as a download on the WiiWare service.)	Nintendo SPD	September 30, 2008	Unreleased	January 18, 2008	
Super Smash Bros. Brawl	Game Arts; HAL Laboratory; Sora Ltd.	January 31, 2008	March 9, 2008	June 27, 2008	
Minna no Joshikiryoku TV	HAL Laboratory	March 6, 2008	Unreleased	Unreleased	
Mario Kart Wii	Nintendo EAD	April 10, 2008	April 27, 2008	April 11, 2008	
Mario Super Sluggers	Bandai Namco Games; Now Production	July 19, 2008	August 25, 2008	Unreleased	
Wario Land: Shake It! (Note: Released as Wario Land: The Shake Dimension in PAL regions.)	Good-Feel	July 24, 2008	September 22, 2008	September 26, 2008	
Fatal Frame: Mask of the Lunar Eclipse	Tecmo Koei; Grasshopper Manufacture; Nintendo SPD	July 31, 2008	Unreleased	Unreleased	
Captain Rainbow	skip Ltd.	August 28, 2008	Unreleased	Unreleased	
Disaster: Day of Crisis	Monolith Soft	September 25, 2008	Unreleased	October 24, 2008	
Wii Music	Nintendo EAD	October 16, 2008	October 20, 2008	November 14, 2008	
Animal Crossing: City Folk (Note: Released as Animal Crossing: Let's Go to the City in PAL regions.)	Nintendo EAD	November 20, 2008	November 16, 2008	December 5, 2008	
New Play Control! Donkey Kong Jungle Beat	Nintendo EAD Tokyo	December 11, 2008	May 4, 2009	June 5, 2009	
New Play Control! Pikmin	Nintendo EAD	December 25, 2008	March 9, 2009	February 6, 2009	
New Play Control! Mario Power Tennis	Camelot Software Planning	January 15, 2009	March 9, 2009	March 6, 2009	
Another Code: R – A Journey into Lost Memories	Cing	February 5, 2009	Unreleased	June 26, 2009	
New Play Control! Metroid Prime	Retro Studios	February 19, 2009	Unreleased	Unreleased	
New Play Control! Pikmin 2	Nintendo EAD	March 12, 2009	June 10, 2012	April 24, 2009	
Excitebots: Trick Racing (Note: The title was exclusively available via the Club Nintendo service in Japan.)	Monster Games; Nintendo SPD	August 30, 2011	April 20, 2009	Unreleased	
Punch-Out	Next Level Games	July 23, 2009	May 18, 2009	May 22, 2009	
Takt of Magic	Taito	May 21, 2009	Unreleased	Unreleased	
New Play Control! Metroid Prime 2	Retro Studios	June 11, 2009	Unreleased	Unreleased	
New Play Control! Chibi-Robo!	skip Ltd.	June 11, 2009	Unreleased	Unreleased	
Wii Sports Resort	Nintendo EAD	June 25, 2009	July 26, 2009	July 24, 2009	
Metroid Prime: Trilogy	Retro Studios	Unreleased	August 24, 2009	September 4, 2009	
Endless Ocean: Blue World (Note: Released as Endless Ocean 2: Adventures of the Deep in PAL regions.)	Arika	September 17, 2009	February 22, 2010	February 5, 2010	
Wii Fit Plus	Nintendo EAD	October 1, 2009	October 4, 2009	October 30, 2009	
Mario & Sonic at the Olympic Winter Games	Sega; Racjin	November 5, 2009	October 13, 2009	October 16, 2009	
Sin & Punishment: Star Successor (Note: Released as Sin and Punishment: Successor of the Skies in PAL regions.)	Treasure	October 29, 2009	June 27, 2010	May 7, 2010	
New Super Mario Bros. Wii	Nintendo EAD	December 3, 2009	November 15, 2009	November 20, 2009	
PokéPark Wii: Pikachu's Adventure	Creatures Inc.	December 5, 2009	November 1, 2010	July 9, 2010	
NHK Kōhaku Quiz Gassen	Nintendo EAD	December 17, 2009	Unreleased	Unreleased	
Zangeki no Reginleiv	Sandlot	February 11, 2010	Unreleased	Unreleased	
And-Kensaku	Shift	April 29, 2010	Unreleased	Unreleased	
Super Mario Galaxy 2	Nintendo EAD Tokyo	May 27, 2010	May 23, 2010	June 11, 2010	
Xenoblade Chronicles	Monolith Soft	June 10, 2010	April 6, 2012	August 19, 2011	
Wii Party	NDcube; Nintendo SPD	July 8, 2010	October 3, 2010	October 8, 2010	
Metroid: Other M	Team Ninja; Nintendo SPD	September 2, 2010	August 31, 2010	September 3, 2010	
Kirby's Epic Yarn	Good-Feel; HAL Laboratory	October 14, 2010	October 17, 2010	February 15, 2011	
Super Mario All-Stars 25th Anniversary Edition	Nintendo EAD	October 21, 2010	December 12, 2010	December 3, 2010	
FlingSmash	Artoon	November 18, 2010	November 7, 2010	November 19, 2010	
Donkey Kong Country Returns	Retro Studios	December 9, 2010	November 21, 2010	December 3, 2010	
Mario Sports Mix	Square Enix	November 25, 2010	February 7, 2011	January 28, 2011	
The Last Story	Mistwalker; AQ Interactive	January 27, 2011	Third party	February 24, 2012	
Pandora's Tower	Ganbarion	May 26, 2011	Third party	April 13, 2012	
Wii Play: Motion	Nintendo SPD	July 7, 2011	June 13, 2011	June 24, 2011	
Mystery Case Files: The Malgrave Incident	Big Fish Games; Sanzaru Games	Unreleased	June 27, 2011	September 9, 2011	
Rhythm Heaven Fever (Note: Released as Beat the Beat: Rhythm Paradise in PAL regions.)	Nintendo SPD; TNX Music Recordings	July 21, 2011	February 13, 2012	July 6, 2012	
Just Dance Wii	Ubisoft	October 13, 2011	Unreleased	Unreleased	
Kirby's Return to Dream Land (Note: Released as Kirby's Adventure Wii in PAL regions.)	HAL Laboratory	October 27, 2011	October 24, 2011	November 25, 2011	
Mario & Sonic at the London 2012 Olympic Games	Sega Sports R&D	December 8, 2011	November 6, 2011	November 13, 2011	
PokéPark 2: Wonders Beyond	Creatures Inc.	November 12, 2011	February 27, 2012	March 23, 2012	
The Legend of Zelda: Skyward Sword	Nintendo EAD	November 23, 2011	November 20, 2011	November 18, 2011	
Fortune Street (Note: Released as Boom Street in PAL regions.) (Note: Published by Square Enix in Japan.)	Square Enix	December 1, 2011	December 5, 2011	December 28, 2011	
Kiki Trick	Nintendo SPD	January 19, 2012	Unreleased	Unreleased	
Mario Party 9	NDcube	April 26, 2012	March 11, 2012	March 2, 2012	
Project Zero 2: Wii Edition	Tecmo Koei	June 28, 2012	Unreleased	June 29, 2012	
Kirby's Dream Collection	HAL Laboratory	July 19, 2012	September 16, 2012	Unreleased	
Wii Sports + Wii Sports Resort (Note: Released as 2 games in 1 disc – Wii Sports (first variant) / Wii Sports Resort (second) variant) in North America.)	Nintendo EAD	Unreleased	October 15, 2012	January 11, 2011 (Note: PAL version only released in Australia.)	
Just Dance Wii 2	Ubisoft	July 26, 2012	Unreleased	Unreleased	

Licensed to Nintendo (original release published by another company)
North America and PAL regions only
Title	Licensor(s)	Release date		Ref.
Title	Licensor(s)	NA	PAL	Ref.
Samurai Warriors 3	Koei	September 28, 2010	May 28, 2010	
PAL regions only
Title	Licensor(s)	Release date		Ref.
Title	Licensor(s)	PAL		Ref.
Pangya! Golf with Style	Ntreev Soft, Tecmo	June 8, 2007		
Trauma Center: Second Opinion	Atlus	August 28, 2008		
Trauma Center: New Blood	Atlus	November 7, 2008		
Inazuma Eleven Strikers	Level-5	September 28, 2012		
Japan only
Title	Licensor(s)	Release date		Ref.
Title	Licensor(s)	JP		Ref.
GoldenEye 007	Activision	June 30, 2011		
Epic Mickey	Disney Interactive Studios	August 4, 2011		
South Korea only
Title	Licensor(s)	Release date		Ref.
Title	Licensor(s)	KOR		Ref.
Family Fishing	Bandai Namco	August 1, 2013		
Cooking Mama	Cooking Mama Limited	April 24, 2014		

Nintendo as distributor only (no involvement in licensing or publishing)
PAL regions only
Title	Licensor(s)	Release date	Ref.
Title	Licensor(s)	PAL	Ref.
Kororinpa: Marble Mania	Hudson Soft	February 23, 2007	
Wing Island	Hudson Soft	April 13, 2007	
Resident Evil 4: Wii Edition	Capcom	June 29, 2007	
Resident Evil: The Umbrella Chronicles	Capcom	November 30, 2007	
Zack & Wiki: Quest for Barbaros' Treasure	Capcom	January 18, 2008	
Naruto: Clash of Ninja Revolution European Version	Namco Bandai Games	March 28, 2008	
Harvest Moon: Magical Melody	Natsume Inc.	April 3, 2008	
Family Ski	Namco Bandai Games	June 15, 2008	
Naruto: Clash of Ninja Revolution 2 European Version	Namco Bandai Games	February 13, 2009	
Harvest Moon: Tree of Tranquility	Natsume Inc.	October 22, 2009	
Naruto Shippuden: Clash of Ninja Revolution III European Version	Namco Bandai Games	April 9, 2010	
Monster Hunter Tri	Capcom	April 23, 2010	
Tetris Party Deluxe	Tetris Online, Inc.	September 3, 2010	
Go Vacation	Namco Bandai Games	November 4, 2011	
Quiz Party	Wizarbox	July 27, 2012	

=== WiiWare ===
Licenses owned or co-owned by Nintendo
Title	Developer(s)	Release date		
Title	Developer(s)	JP	NA	PAL
Dr. Mario Online Rx (Note: Released as Dr. Mario & Germ Buster in PAL regions.)	Arika	March 25, 2008	May 26, 2008	May 20, 2008
My Pokémon Ranch (Note: Published by The Pokémon Company in Japan.)	Ambrella	March 25, 2008	June 9, 2008	July 4, 2008
Lonpos (Note: Published by Nintendo outside Japan.)	Genki	March 25, 2008	January 16, 2009	February 2, 2009
Magnetica Twist (Note: Released as Actionloop Twist in PAL regions.)	Mitchell Corporation	April 22, 2008	June 30, 2008	June 6, 2008
Yakuman Wii: Ide Yosuke no Kenko Mahjong	Nintendo; Lancarse Ltd.	May 20, 2008	Unreleased	Unreleased
Tsuushin Taikyoku: Hayasashi Shogi Sandan	Nintendo; Lancarse Ltd.	July 23, 2008	Unreleased	Unreleased
Tsuushin Taikyoku: Igo Dojo 2700-Mon	Nintendo; Lancarse Ltd.	August 5, 2008	Unreleased	Unreleased
Maboshi's Arcade (Note: Released as MaBoShi: The Three Shape Arcade in PAL regions.)	Mindware Corp	October 7, 2008	December 29, 2008	August 29, 2008
World of Goo (Note: Localized and published by Nintendo only in Japan)	2D Boy	April 21, 2009	October 13, 2008	December 19, 2008
Art Style: Orbient	skip Ltd.	May 12, 2009	September 29, 2008	December 19, 2008
Wii Chess (Note: Released in PAL regions only as a retail title.)	Nintendo SPD	September 30, 2008	Unreleased	January 18, 2008
Art Style: Cubello	skip Ltd.	May 12, 2009	October 13, 2008	November 21, 2008
Art Style: Rotohex	skip Ltd.	May 12, 2009	October 27, 2008	December 5, 2008
PictureBook Games: Pop-Up Pursuit (Note: Released as PictureBook Games: A Pop-Up Adventure in PAL regions.)	Grounding Inc.	March 26, 2009	August 17, 2009	October 23, 2009
You, Me, and the Cubes	fyto	March 26, 2009	September 21, 2009	September 25, 2009
Bonsai Barber	Zoonami	April 6, 2010	March 30, 2009	August 7, 2009
WarioWare: D.I.Y. Showcase (Note: Released as WarioWare: Do It Yourself Showcase in PAL regions.)	Intelligent Systems; Nintendo SPD	April 29, 2009	March 28, 2010	April 30, 2010
Pokémon Rumble	Ambrella	June 16, 2009	November 16, 2009	November 20, 2009
Rock N' Roll Climber	Vitei; Nintendo SPD	November 24, 2009	August 10, 2009	November 13, 2009
Doc Louis's Punch-Out (Note: This title was exclusively available via the Club Nintendo service.)	Next Level Games	Unreleased	October 27, 2009	Unreleased
Excitebike: World Rally (Note: Released as Excitebike: World Challenge in PAL regions.)	Monster Games; Nintendo SPD	February 2, 2010	November 9, 2009	February 5, 2010
Grill-Off with Ultra Hand! (Note: This title was exclusively available via the Club Nintendo service.)	Nintendo	November 9, 2009	March 31, 2010	Unreleased
Eco Shooter: Plant 530	Intelligent Systems	November 24, 2009	December 21, 2009	January 29, 2010
AquaSpace (Note: Released as Zenquaria: Virtual Aquarium in PAL regions.)	Paon	March 2, 2010	July 19, 2010	July 9, 2010
Art Style: light trax	skip Ltd.	September 6, 2011	May 24, 2010	June 25, 2010
Art Style: Rotozoa (Note: Released as Art Style: Penta Tentacles in PAL regions.)	skip Ltd.	October 18, 2010	June 21, 2010	May 28, 2010
Line Attack Heroes	Grezzo	July 27, 2010	Unreleased	Unreleased
ThruSpace	Keys Factory	September 7, 2010	October 18, 2010	November 5, 2010
Snowpack Park	skip Ltd.	December 21, 2010	November 22, 2010	Unreleased
Fluidity (Note: Released as Hydroventure in PAL regions.)	Curve Studios	Unreleased	December 6, 2010	December 24, 2010

The Pokémon Company-published titles (Note: The Pokémon Company is jointly owned by Nintendo, Game Freak, and Creatures.)
Title	Developer(s)	Release date		
Title	Developer(s)	JP	NA	PAL
Pokémon Fushigi no Dungeon Ikuzo! Arashi no Bōkendan	Chunsoft	August 4, 2009	Unreleased	Unreleased
Pokémon Fushigi no Dungeon Mezase! Hikari no Bōkendan	Chunsoft	August 4, 2009	Unreleased	Unreleased
Pokémon Fushigi no Dungeon Susume! Honō no Bōkendan	Chunsoft	August 4, 2009	Unreleased	Unreleased

== Wii U ==
Licenses owned or co-owned by Nintendo
Title	Developer(s)	Release date			Ref.
Title	Developer(s)	JP	NA	PAL	Ref.
New Super Mario Bros. U	Nintendo EAD	December 8, 2012	November 18, 2012	November 30, 2012	
Nintendo Land	Nintendo EAD	December 8, 2012	November 18, 2012	November 30, 2012	
Sing Party	FreeStyleGames; Nintendo SPD	Unreleased	November 18, 2012	January 18, 2013	
Lego City Undercover	TT Fusion	July 25, 2013	March 18, 2013	March 28, 2013	
Game & Wario	Intelligent Systems; Nintendo SPD	March 28, 2013	June 23, 2013	June 28, 2013	
Pikmin 3	Nintendo EAD	July 13, 2013	August 4, 2013	July 26, 2013	
New Super Luigi U	Nintendo EAD	July 13, 2013	August 25, 2013	July 26, 2013	
The Wonderful 101	PlatinumGames	August 24, 2013	September 15, 2013	August 23, 2013	
The Legend of Zelda: The Wind Waker HD	Nintendo EAD	September 26, 2013	September 20, 2013	October 4, 2013	
Wii Party U	NDcube; Nintendo SPD	October 31, 2013	October 25, 2013	October 25, 2013	
Wii Fit U	Nintendo EAD; Ganbarion	October 31, 2013	November 1, 2013	November 1, 2013	
New Super Mario Bros. U + New Super Luigi U	Nintendo EAD	Unreleased	November 1, 2013	November 7, 2013	
Mario & Sonic at the Sochi 2014 Olympic Winter Games	Sega Sports R&D	December 5, 2013	November 15, 2013	November 8, 2013	
Super Mario 3D World	Nintendo EAD Tokyo	November 21, 2013	November 22, 2013	November 29, 2013	
Donkey Kong Country: Tropical Freeze	Retro Studios; Monster Games	February 13, 2014	February 21, 2014	February 21, 2014	
Just Dance Wii U	Ubisoft	April 3, 2014	Unreleased	Unreleased	
NES Remix Pack	Nintendo EAD Tokyo; indieszero	April 24, 2014	December 5, 2014	Unreleased	
Mario Kart 8	Nintendo EAD	May 29, 2014	May 30, 2014	May 30, 2014	
Wii Sports Club	Bandai Namco Studios; Nintendo EAD	July 17, 2014	July 25, 2014	July 11, 2014	
Hyrule Warriors (Note: Published by Nintendo outside Japan.)	Omega Force; Team Ninja	August 14, 2014	September 26, 2014	September 19, 2014	
Bayonetta	PlatinumGames	September 20, 2014	October 24, 2014	October 24, 2014	
Bayonetta 2	PlatinumGames	September 20, 2014	October 24, 2014	October 24, 2014	
Fatal Frame: Maiden of Black Water (Note: Released as Project Zero: Maiden of Black Water in PAL regions.)	Koei Tecmo	September 27, 2014	October 22, 2015 (Note: Released on Wii U eShop.)	October 30, 2015	
Captain Toad: Treasure Tracker	Nintendo EAD Tokyo	November 13, 2014	December 5, 2014	January 2, 2015	
Super Smash Bros. for Wii U	Bandai Namco Studios; Sora Ltd.	December 6, 2014	November 21, 2014	November 28, 2014	
Kirby and the Rainbow Curse	HAL Laboratory	January 22, 2015	February 20, 2015	May 8, 2015	
Mario Party 10	NDcube	March 12, 2015	March 20, 2015	March 20, 2015	
Mario vs. Donkey Kong: Tipping Stars	Nintendo Software Technology	March 19, 2015	March 5, 2015	March 20, 2015	
Xenoblade Chronicles X	Monolith Soft	April 29, 2015	December 4, 2015	December 4, 2015	
Splatoon	Nintendo EAD	May 28, 2015	May 29, 2015	May 29, 2015	
Yoshi's Woolly World	Good-Feel	July 16, 2015	October 16, 2015	June 26, 2015	
Art Academy: Home Studio (Note: Released as Art Academy: Atelier in PAL regions.)	Headstrong Games	December 12, 2015	June 25, 2015	June 26, 2015	
Devil's Third	Valhalla Game Studios; Nintendo SPD	August 4, 2015	December 11, 2015	August 28, 2015	
Super Mario Maker	Nintendo EAD	September 10, 2015	September 11, 2015	September 11, 2015	
Animal Crossing: Amiibo Festival	Nintendo EPD; NDcube	November 21, 2015	November 13, 2015	November 20, 2015	
Mario Tennis: Ultra Smash	Camelot Software Planning	January 28, 2016	November 20, 2015	November 20, 2015	
Tokyo Mirage Sessions#FE	Atlus	December 26, 2015	June 24, 2016	June 24, 2016	
The Legend of Zelda: Twilight Princess HD	Tantalus; Nintendo EPD	March 10, 2016	March 4, 2016	March 4, 2016	
Pokkén Tournament (Note: Published by The Pokémon Company in Japan.)	Bandai Namco Studios	March 18, 2016	March 18, 2016	March 18, 2016	
Star Fox Zero	Nintendo EPD; PlatinumGames	April 21, 2016	April 21, 2016	April 21, 2016	
Star Fox Guard	Nintendo EPD; PlatinumGames	April 21, 2016	April 21, 2016	April 21, 2016	
Mario & Sonic at the Rio 2016 Olympic Games	Sega Sports R&D	June 23, 2016	June 24, 2016	June 24, 2016	
Paper Mario: Color Splash	Intelligent Systems	October 13, 2016	October 7, 2016	October 7, 2016	
The Legend of Zelda: Breath of the Wild	Nintendo EPD	March 3, 2017	March 3, 2017	March 3, 2017	

Licensed to Nintendo (original release published by another company)
North America and PAL regions only
Title	Licensor(s)	Release date		Ref.
Title	Licensor(s)	NA	PAL	Ref.
Ninja Gaiden 3: Razor's Edge	Tecmo Koei	November 18, 2012	January 11, 2013	
PAL regions only
Title	Licensor(s)	Release date		Ref.
Title	Licensor(s)	PAL		Ref.
Scribblenauts Unlimited	Warner Bros. Interactive Entertainment	December 6, 2013		
Japan only
Title	Licensor(s)	Release date		Ref.
Title	Licensor(s)	JP		Ref.
Rayman Legends	Ubisoft	October 17, 2013		
Trine 2: Director's Cut	Frozenbyte	January 22, 2014		
Little Inferno	Tomorrow Corporation	April 2, 2015		
The Swapper	Facepalm Games	April 2, 2015		
Swords & Soldiers	Ronimo Games	November 13, 2015		
Year Walk	Simogo	November 13, 2015		
Swords & Soldiers II	Ronimo Games	December 9, 2015		
Shovel Knight	Yacht Club Games	June 30, 2016		

Nintendo as distributor only (no involvement in licensing or publishing)
North America and PAL regions only
Title	Licensor(s)	Release date		Ref.
Title	Licensor(s)	NA	PAL	Ref.
Minecraft: Wii U Edition	Mojang Studios	June 17, 2016	June 17, 2016	
PAL regions only
Title	Licensor(s)	Release date		Ref.
Title	Licensor(s)	PAL		Ref.
Monster Hunter 3 Ultimate	Capcom	March 22, 2013		
Sonic Lost World	Sega	October 18, 2013		
Sonic Boom: Rise of Lyric	Sega	November 21, 2014		
Japan only
Title	Licensor(s)	Release date		Ref.
Title	Licensor(s)	JP		Ref.
Yo-kai Watch Dance: Just Dance Special Version	Level-5	December 5, 2015		
Under Nintendo eShop Selects label only, PAL regions only
Title	Licensor(s)	Release date		Ref.
Title	Licensor(s)	PAL		Ref.
Fast Racing Neo	Shin'en Multimedia	September 30, 2016		
SteamWorld Collection	Image & Form	September 30, 2016		

=== eShop Exclusives ===
Licenses owned or co-owned by Nintendo
Title	Developer(s)	Release date			Ref.
Title	Developer(s)	JP	NA	PAL	Ref.
Wii Karaoke U by JOYSOUND	TOSE	December 8, 2012	Unreleased	October 4, 2013	
Wii Street U	Google, Nintendo Software Technology	February 7, 2013	February 14, 2013	February 14, 2013	
Pokémon Rumble U (Note: Published by The Pokémon Company in Japan.)	Ambrella	April 24, 2013	August 29, 2013	August 15, 2013	
Wii Sports Club	Bandai Namco Studios; Nintendo EAD	October 20, 2013	November 7, 2013	November 7, 2013	
Wii Sports Club - Golf	Bandai Namco Studios; Nintendo EAD	December 18, 2013	December 18, 2013	December 18, 2013	
NES Remix	Nintendo EAD Tokyo; indieszero	December 19, 2013	December 18, 2013	December 18, 2013	
Dr. Luigi	Arika; Nintendo SPD	January 15, 2014	December 31, 2013	January 15, 2014	
NES Remix 2	Nintendo EAD Tokyo; indieszero	April 24, 2014	April 25, 2014	April 25, 2014	
Pushmo World (Note: Released as Pullblox World in PAL regions.)	Intelligent Systems; Nintendo SPD	June 19, 2014	June 19, 2014	June 19, 2014	
Poppo Hunter	Nintendo Game Seminar 2013 Team A	June 19, 2014	Unreleased	Unreleased	
Kanarasu To: Center Heroes	Nintendo Game Seminar 2013 Team B	June 19, 2014	Unreleased	Unreleased	
Shima Nagame	Nintendo Game Seminar 2013 Team X	June 19, 2014	Unreleased	Unreleased	
Sentou Danchi	Nintendo Game Seminar 2013 Team Y	June 19, 2014	Unreleased	Unreleased	
Nintendo Game Seminar 2013: Jukousei Sakuhin	Nintendo Game Seminar 2013	July 19, 2014	Unreleased	Unreleased	
Wii Sports Club - Baseball	Bandai Namco Studios; Nintendo EAD	June 27, 2014	June 26, 2014	June 27, 2014	
Wii Sports Club - Boxing	Bandai Namco Studios; Nintendo EAD	June 27, 2014	June 26, 2014	June 27, 2014	
Yakuman Houou	Lancarse	February 18, 2015	Unreleased	Unreleased	
amiibo tap: Nintendo's Greatest Bits (Note: Released as amiibo Touch & Play: Nintendo Classics Highlights in PAL regions.)	Nintendo Software Technology	April 23, 2015	April 30, 2015	April 30, 2015	
Doki Doki Tegami Relay	Nintendo Game Seminar 2014 Team A	June 24, 2015	Unreleased	Unreleased	
Michiko Jump!	Nintendo Game Seminar 2014 Team B	June 24, 2015	Unreleased	Unreleased	
Jikansa Tansa	Nintendo Game Seminar 2014 Team X	June 24, 2015	Unreleased	Unreleased	
Arucrash	Nintendo Game Seminar 2014 Team Y	June 24, 2015	Unreleased	Unreleased	
Mini Mario & Friends: Amiibo Challenge	Nintendo Software Technology	January 28, 2016	April 28, 2016	April 28, 2016	

Licensed to Nintendo (Worldwide)
Title	Developer(s)	Licensor(s)	Release date			Ref.
Title	Developer(s)	Licensor(s)	JP	NA	PAL	Ref.
Tiny Thief	Abylight	Rovio Entertainment	November 13, 2015	Unreleased	Unreleased	

== Personal computer ==
The Pokémon Company-published titles (Note: The Pokémon Company is jointly owned by Nintendo, Game Freak, and Creatures.)
Title	Developer(s)	Platform(s)	Release date			Ref.
Title	Developer(s)	Platform(s)	JP	NA	PAL	Ref.
Pokémon Scoop 2004 Winter Disc (Note: Included in the 2004 Winter issue of Pokémon Scoop magazine.)	Cyberworld International Corporation	Windows	January 18, 2004	Unreleased	Unreleased	
Pokémon Scoop 2004 Summer Disc (Note: Included in the 2004 Summer issue of Pokémon Scoop magazine.)	Cyberworld International Corporation	Windows	July 17, 2004	Unreleased	Unreleased	
Pokémon Scoop 2006 Spring Disc (Note: Included in the 2006 Spring issue of Pokémon Scoop magazine.)	Cyberworld International Corporation	Windows	Spring 2006	Unreleased	Unreleased	
Pokémon PC Master	Ambrella	Windows	2006	Unreleased	Unreleased	
Pokémon Trading Card Game Online (Note: First released as a browser game tilted Pokémon Trainer Challenge.) (Note: Shut down on June 8, 2023.)	Electrified Games, Sleepy Giant Entertainment, Plexipixel, Inversoft, Dire Wolf Digital	Windows	May 15, 2012			
Pokémon Trading Card Game Online	Electrified Games, Sleepy Giant Entertainment, Plexipixel, Inversoft, Dire Wolf Digital	macOS	November 5, 2012			
Pokémon Trading Card Game Live	The Pokémon Company	Windows, macOS	June 8, 2023			

=== Browser ===
Licenses owned or co-owned by Nintendo
Title	Developer(s)	Release date			Ref.
Title	Developer(s)	JP	NA	PAL	Ref.
Camp Hyrule	Nintendo	August 15, 1995 (Note: Shut down in 2007.)			

Title	Developer(s)	Release date					Ref.
Title	Developer(s)	JP	NA	PAL	KOR	HK/TW	Ref.
Pokémon Bulgasaui Dungeon Hwanggeum Gujodae (Note: Shut down in April 2008.)	Chunsoft	Unreleased	Unreleased	Unreleased	August 11, 2007	Unreleased	
Pokémon Card Game Online (Note: Shut down on August 31, 2010.)	The Pokémon Company	September 18, 2010	Unreleased	Unreleased	Unreleased	Unreleased	
Pokémon Dream World (Note: Shut down on January 14, 2014.)	The Pokémon Company	September 18, 2010					
Pokémon TV (Note: Shut down on March 28, 2024.)	The Pokémon Company	November 2010					
Pokémon Trainer Challenge (Note: Unavailable since the release of the downloadable version on May 15, 2012.)	Electrified Games, Sleepy Giant Entertainment, Plexipixel, Inversoft, Dire Wolf Digital	March 24, 2011					
Pokémon Battle Chess WEB	The Pokémon Company	December 26, 2011	Unreleased	Unreleased	Unreleased	Unreleased	
Pokémon Ie TAP? For PC	Creatures Inc.	2011	Unreleased	Unreleased	Unreleased	Unreleased	
Jīnglíng Bǎokěmèng Diǎn diǎn míng Jiézòu Yóuxì	Neilo	Unreleased	Unreleased	Unreleased	Unreleased	January 18, 2019	

Sponsored by Nintendo of Europe (PAL regions only)
Title	Developer(s)	Release date	Ref.
Title	Developer(s)	PAL	Ref.
UPIXO in Action: Mission in Snowdriftland	Extra Toxic tons of bits	December 1, 2006	
Chick Chick Boom	Extra Toxic tons of bits	April 3, 2007	

== Developed but not published by Nintendo ==
Title	Platform(s)	Developer(s)	Publisher(s)	Release date (Japan)	Ref.					
Title	Platform(s)	Developer(s)	Publisher(s)	Release date (Japan)	Ref.	Donkey Kong Jr. + Jr. Sansū Lesson (Note: Shipped with the Sharp's Famicom TV C1.)	Famicom	Nintendo R&D2	Sharp	October 4 1983
PLAYBOX BASIC (Note: Shipped with the My Computer Keyboard (マイコンピュータキーボード) for the Sharp's Famicom TV C1.)	Famicom	Nintendo, Hudson Soft, Sharp	Sharp	Autumn 1984						
I Am a Teacher: Super Mario Sweater	Famicom Disk System	Nintendo	Royal Industries	August 27, 1986						
All Night Nippon Super Mario Bros.	Famicom Disk System	Nintendo R&D4	Nippon Broadcasting System	December 20, 1986						
Yume Kōjō: Doki Doki Panic	Famicom Disk System	Nintendo R&D4	Nippon Broadcasting System	July 10, 1987						
Motoko-chan no Wonder Kitchen	Super Famicom	Nintendo	Ajinomoto	September 1993						
Snoopy Concert	Super Famicom	Pax Softonica, Nintendo R&D1	Mitsui Fudosan, Dentsu	May 19, 1995						

== Officially-licensed without direct Nintendo involvement ==
There have been several commercially released video games officially licensed to use Nintendo-owned intellectual properties without the company or one of its subsidiaries being involved in the game's production or distribution.

Title	Developer(s)	Publisher(s)	Platform(s)	Release date			Ref.
Title	Developer(s)	Publisher(s)	Platform(s)	JP	NA	PAL	Ref.
Fully Nintendo-Owned Licenses
Donkey Kong	Imaginative Systems Software	Coleco	Atari 2600	Unreleased	July 1982	1983	
Donkey Kong	Coleco	Coleco	ColecoVision	Unreleased	August 1982	July 1983	
Donkey Kong	Coleco	Coleco	Tabletop arcade	Unreleased	August 1982	1983	
Donkey Kong	Roklan	Coleco	Intellivision	Unreleased	September 1982	1983	
Donkey Kong	Atari, Inc.	Atari, Inc.	Atari 8-bit computers	Unreleased	June 1983	1983	
Donkey Kong	K-Byte	Atarisoft	TI-99/4A	Unreleased	November 1983	Unreleased	
Donkey Kong	Softweaver	Atarisoft	MS-DOS	Unreleased	November 1983	Unreleased	
Donkey Kong	Human Engineered Software	Atarisoft	Apple II	Unreleased	December 1983	Unreleased	
Donkey Kong	Syndein Systems	Atarisoft	VIC-20	Unreleased	February 1984	Unreleased	
Donkey Kong	K-Byte	Atarisoft	Commodore 64	Unreleased	March 1984	Unreleased	
Donkey Kong	Coleco	Coleco	Coleco Adam	Unreleased	June 1984	Unreleased	
Donkey Kong	Arcana Software Design	Ocean Software	Amstrad CPC	Unreleased	Unreleased	December 1986	
Donkey Kong	Arcana Software Design	Ocean Software	Commodore 64	Unreleased	Unreleased	December 1986	
Donkey Kong	Sentient Software Ltd	Ocean Software	ZX Spectrum	Unreleased	Unreleased	December 1986	
Donkey Kong	Sentient Software Ltd	Ocean Software	MSX	Unreleased	Unreleased	1986	
Donkey Kong	ITDC	Atari Corporation	Atari 7800	Unreleased	November 1988	1988	
Donkey Kong Jr.	Coleco	Coleco	ColecoVision	Unreleased	February 1983	1983	
Donkey Kong Jr.	Woodside Design Associates	Coleco	Atari 2600	Unreleased	September 1983	1983	
Donkey Kong Jr.	Roklan	Coleco	Intellivision	Unreleased	October 1983	1983	
Donkey Kong Jr.	Atari, Inc.	Atari, Inc.	Atari 8-bit computers	Unreleased	March 1984	1985	
Donkey Kong Jr.	Coleco	Coleco	Coleco Adam	Unreleased	April 1984	Unreleased	
Donkey Kong Jr.	ITDC	Atari Corporation	Atari 7800	Unreleased	November 1988	1989	
Sky Skipper	Western Technologies	Parker Brothers	Atari 2600	Unreleased	April 1983	Unreleased	
Mario Bros.	Atari, Inc.	Atari, Inc.	Atari 2600	Unreleased	December 1983	Unreleased	
Mario Bros.	Atari, Inc.	Atari, Inc.	Atari 5200	Unreleased	February 1984	Unreleased	
Mario Bros.	MISA	Westside Soft House	PC-8001	February 1984	Unreleased	Unreleased	
Mario Bros.	Choice Software	Ocean Software	Amstrad CPC	Unreleased	Unreleased	June 19, 1987	
Mario Bros.	Ocean Software	Ocean Software	Commodore 64	Unreleased	Unreleased	1987	
Mario Bros.	Choice Software	Ocean Software	ZX Spectrum	Unreleased	Unreleased	1987	
Mario Bros.	Sculptured Software	Atari Corporation	Atari 8-bit computers	Unreleased	November 22, 1988	Unreleased	
Mario Bros.	ITDC	Atari Corporation	Atari 7800	Unreleased	December 1988	Unreleased	
Mario Bros. Special	Hudson Soft	Hudson Soft	PC-6001	August 1984	Unreleased	Unreleased	
Mario Bros. Special	Hudson Soft	Hudson Soft	PC-8001	August 1984	Unreleased	Unreleased	
Mario Bros. Special	Hudson Soft	Hudson Soft	PC-8801	August 1984	Unreleased	Unreleased	
Mario Bros. Special	Hudson Soft	Hudson Soft	PC-9801	August 1984	Unreleased	Unreleased	
Mario Bros. Special	Hudson Soft	Hudson Soft	FM-7	August 1984	Unreleased	Unreleased	
Mario Bros. Special	Hudson Soft	Hudson Soft	Sharp X1	August 1984	Unreleased	Unreleased	
Mario Bros. Special	Hudson Soft	Hudson Soft	MZ-1500	August 1984	Unreleased	Unreleased	
Mario Bros. Special	Hudson Soft	Hudson Soft	MZ-2500	August 1984	Unreleased	Unreleased	
Mario Bros. Special	Hudson Soft	Hudson Soft	Hitachi S1	August 1984	Unreleased	Unreleased	
Mario Bros. Special	Hudson Soft	Hudson Soft	SMC-777	August 1984	Unreleased	Unreleased	
Punch Ball Mario Bros.	Hudson Soft	Hudson Soft	PC-6001	October 5, 1984	Unreleased	Unreleased	
Punch Ball Mario Bros.	Hudson Soft	Hudson Soft	PC-8001	October 5, 1984	Unreleased	Unreleased	
Punch Ball Mario Bros.	Hudson Soft	Hudson Soft	PC-8801	October 5, 1984	Unreleased	Unreleased	
Punch Ball Mario Bros.	Hudson Soft	Hudson Soft	FM-7	October 5, 1984	Unreleased	Unreleased	
Punch Ball Mario Bros.	Hudson Soft	Hudson Soft	Sharp X1	October 5, 1984	Unreleased	Unreleased	
Punch Ball Mario Bros.	Hudson Soft	Hudson Soft	MZ-1500	October 5, 1984	Unreleased	Unreleased	
Punch Ball Mario Bros.	Hudson Soft	Hudson Soft	Hitachi S1	October 5, 1984	Unreleased	Unreleased	
Donkey Kong 3: Dai Gyakushū	Hudson Soft	Hudson Soft	PC-6001	September 1985	Unreleased	Unreleased	
Donkey Kong 3: Dai Gyakushū	Hudson Soft	Hudson Soft	PC-8801	September 1985	Unreleased	Unreleased	
Donkey Kong 3: Dai Gyakushū	Hudson Soft	Hudson Soft	Sharp X1	September 1985	Unreleased	Unreleased	
Tennis	Hudson Soft	Hudson Soft	PC-88	June 1985	Unreleased	Unreleased	
Tennis	Hudson Soft	Hudson Soft	PC-8001mkIISR	1985	Unreleased	Unreleased	
Tennis	Hudson Soft	Hudson Soft	Sharp X1	1985	Unreleased	Unreleased	
Tennis	Hudson Soft	Hudson Soft	Sharp MZ	1985	Unreleased	Unreleased	
Balloon Fight	Hudson Soft	Hudson Soft	PC-8801	October 1985	Unreleased	Unreleased	
Balloon Fight	Hudson Soft	Hudson Soft	Sharp X1	November 1985	Unreleased	Unreleased	
Balloon Fight	Hudson Soft	Hudson Soft	PC-8001mkIISR	1985	Unreleased	Unreleased	
Balloon Fight	Hudson Soft	Hudson Soft	Sharp MZ	1985	Unreleased	Unreleased	
Ice Climber	Hudson Soft	Hudson Soft	PC-8801	October 1985	Unreleased	Unreleased	
Ice Climber	Hudson Soft	Hudson Soft	Sharp X1	November 1985	Unreleased	Unreleased	
Excitebike	Hudson Soft	Hudson Soft	PC-8801	October 1985	Unreleased	Unreleased	
Excitebike	Hudson Soft	Hudson Soft	PC-8001mkIISR	1985	Unreleased	Unreleased	
Excitebike	Hudson Soft	Hudson Soft	Sharp X1	1985	Unreleased	Unreleased	
Excitebike	Hudson Soft	Hudson Soft	Sharp MZ	1985	Unreleased	Unreleased	
Golf	Hudson Soft	Hudson Soft	Hitachi B16	1985	Unreleased	Unreleased	
Golf	Hudson Soft	Hudson Soft	PC-8001mkIISR	1985	Unreleased	Unreleased	
Golf	Hudson Soft	Hudson Soft	PC-8801	1985	Unreleased	Unreleased	
Golf	Hudson Soft	Hudson Soft	PC-9801	1985	Unreleased	Unreleased	
Golf	Hudson Soft	Hudson Soft	Sharp X1	1985	Unreleased	Unreleased	
Super Mario Bros. Special	Hudson Soft	Hudson Soft	PC-8801	September 1986	Unreleased	Unreleased	
Super Mario Bros. Special	Hudson Soft	Hudson Soft	Sharp X1	September 1986	Unreleased	Unreleased	
Super Mario Bros. Special	Hudson Soft	Static Soft	SPC-1500	March 1989 (Korea only)	Unreleased	Unreleased	
Super Mario Bros. Print World	Codesmith, Inc.	Hi Tech Expressions	MS-DOS	Unreleased	March 30, 1991	Unreleased	
Super Mario Bros. Print World	Codesmith, Inc.	Hi Tech Expressions	Apple II	Unreleased	March 30, 1991	Unreleased	
Super Mario Bros. Print World	Codesmith, Inc.	Hi Tech Expressions	Commodore 64	Unreleased	March 30, 1991	Unreleased	
Mario Teaches Typing	Interplay Productions	Interplay Productions	MS-DOS (floppy disk version)	March 8, 1992	November 13, 1992	December 1, 1992	
Mario Teaches Typing	Interplay Productions	Interplay Productions	Macintosh (floppy disk version)	Unreleased	1993	Unreleased	
Super Mario Bros. & Friends: When I Grow Up	Brian A. Rice, Inc.	Merit Software	MS-DOS	Unreleased	March 24, 1992	Unreleased	
Hello Kitty World	Mario Co., Ltd	Character Soft	Family Computer	March 27, 1992	Unreleased	Unreleased	
Mario Is Missing!	The Software Toolworks	The Software Toolworks	MS-DOS (floppy disk version)	Unreleased	January 1993	1993	
Mario Is Missing!	The Software Toolworks	The Software Toolworks	Super NES	Unreleased	June 1993	October 1993	
Mario Is Missing!	Radical Entertainment	The Software Toolworks	NES	Unreleased	June 1993	October 1993	
Mario Is Missing!	The Software Toolworks	The Software Toolworks	Macintosh (floppy disk version)	Unreleased	1993	Unreleased	
Yoshi's Cookie	Tose	Bullet-Proof Software	Super NES	July 9, 1993	June 1993	1993	
Link: The Faces of Evil	Animation Magic	Philips Interactive Media	Philips CD-i	Unreleased	October 10, 1993	December 25, 1993	
Zelda: The Wand of Gamelon	Animation Magic	Philips Interactive Media	Philips CD-i	Unreleased	October 10, 1993	December 25, 1993	
Mario's Time Machine	The Software Toolworks	The Software Toolworks	MS-DOS	Unreleased	1993	1993	
Mario's Time Machine	The Software Toolworks	The Software Toolworks	Super NES	Unreleased	December 1993	March 1994	
Mario's Time Machine	Radical Entertainment	The Software Toolworks	NES	Unreleased	June 1994	Unreleased	
Mario's Early Years! Fun with Numbers	The Software Toolworks	The Software Toolworks	MS-DOS	Unreleased	1993	1993	
Mario's Early Years! Fun with Numbers	Mindscape	Mindscape	Super NES	Unreleased	September 1994	Unreleased	
Mario's Early Years! Fun with Letters	The Software Toolworks	The Software Toolworks	MS-DOS	Unreleased	1993	1993	
Mario's Early Years! Fun with Letters	Mindscape	Mindscape	Super NES	Unreleased	October 1994	Unreleased	
Mario's Early Years! Preschool Fun	The Software Toolworks	The Software Toolworks	MS-DOS	Unreleased	1993	1993	
Mario's Early Years! Preschool Fun	Mindscape	Mindscape	Super NES	Unreleased	November 1994	Unreleased	
Mario Teaches Typing Enhanced	Presage Software	Interplay Productions	MS-DOS (CD-ROM version)	Unreleased	1993	Unreleased	
Mario Teaches Typing Enhanced	Presage Software	Interplay Productions	Macintosh (CD-ROM version)	Unreleased	May 11, 1995	Unreleased	
Hotel Mario	Fantasy Factory	Philips Interactive Media	Philips CD-i	Unreleased	June 1994	June 1994	
Mario is Missing! Deluxe	Mindscape	Mindscape	MS-DOS (CD-ROM version)	Unreleased	June 1994	Unreleased	
Mario is Missing! Deluxe	Mindscape	Mindscape	Macintosh (CD-ROM version)	Unreleased	June 1994	Unreleased	
Mario's Time Machine Deluxe	Mindscape	Mindscape	Windows	Unreleased	1994	Unreleased	
Mario's Time Machine Deluxe	Mindscape	Mindscape	Macintosh	Unreleased	1994	Unreleased	
Mario's Early Years! CD-ROM Collection	Mindscape	Mindscape	MS-DOS	Unreleased	1994	Unreleased	
Yoshi no Cookie: Kuruppon Oven de Cookie	National Human Electronics	Bullet-Proof Software	Super Famicom	1994	Unreleased	Unreleased	
UNDAKE30 Same Game Daisakusen Mario Version	Hudson Soft	Hudson Soft	Super Famicom	January 16, 1995	Unreleased	Unreleased	
Mario's Game Gallery	Presage Software	Interplay Productions	MS-DOS (floppy disk & CD-ROM version)	Unreleased	February 23, 1995	Unreleased	
Mario's Game Gallery	Presage Software	Interplay Productions	Macintosh (floppy disk & CD-ROM version)	Unreleased	February 23, 1995	Unreleased	
Mario's Game Gallery	Presage Software	Interplay Productions	Windows	Unreleased	February 23, 1995	Unreleased	
Mud Pies Mario's Early Years! Collection	Mindscape	Memorex Software	MS-DOS	Unreleased	1995	Unreleased	
Zelda's Adventure	Viridis Corporation	Philips Interactive Media	Philips CD-i	Unreleased	Unreleased	May 10, 1996	
Mario's FUNdamentals	Brainstorm Entertainment	Stepping Stone	Macintosh	Unreleased	1996	Unreleased	
Mario's FUNdamentals	Brainstorm Entertainment	Mindscape	Windows	Unreleased	January 1997	Unreleased	
Mario Net Quest	C3 Incorporated	IBM	Browser game	March 14, 1997	March 14, 1997	March 14, 1997	
Mario Teaches Typing 2	Brainstorm	Interplay Productions	Windows / Macintosh	Unreleased	March 31, 1997	Unreleased	
Mario no Photopi	Tokyo Electron	Tokyo Electron	Nintendo 64	December 2, 1998	Unreleased	Unreleased	
Cruis'n	Just Games Interactive	Midway Games	Wii	Unreleased	November 27, 2007	February 15, 2008	
Nintendo / King Features Syndicate Co-Owned Licenses
Popeye	Roklan, On-Time Software	Parker Brothers	Atari 2600	Unreleased	August 1983	Unreleased	
Popeye	Western Technologies	Parker Brothers	ColecoVision	Unreleased	August 1983	Unreleased	
Popeye	Roklan	Parker Brothers	Intellivision	Unreleased	August 1983	Unreleased	
Popeye	Western Technologies	Parker Brothers	Atari 5200	Unreleased	November 1983	Unreleased	
Popeye	Western Technologies	Parker Brothers	Atari 8-bit computers	Unreleased	November 1983	1983	
Popeye	Amazon Systems	Parker Brothers	Magnavox Odyssey 2	Unreleased	1983	1983	
Popeye	Western Technologies	Parker Brothers	TI-99/4A	Unreleased	February 1984	Unreleased	
Popeye	Western Technologies	Parker Brothers	Commodore 64	Unreleased	April 1984	1984	
Nintendo / Midway Co-Owned Licenses
Cruis'n Exotica	Gratuitous Games	Midway Games	Nintendo 64	Unreleased	October 17, 2000	Unreleased	
Nintendo / Creatures Inc. / Game Freak Co-Owned Licenses
Pokémon Project Studio Red and Blue Version	Leisure Concepts	The Learning Company	Windows	Unreleased	November 9, 1999	Unreleased	
Pokémon Play It!	Fluid Entertainment	Wizards of the Coast	Windows	Unreleased	February 2000	December 1999	
Pokémon Play It! Version 2	Fluid Entertainment	Wizards of the Coast	Windows	Unreleased	February 29, 2000	February 29, 2000	
Pokémon the Movie 2000 Adventure	Cyberworld International Corporation	Warner Bros.	Browser game	Unreleased	2000	Unreleased	
PokéROM	Basis Applied Technology	The Learning Company, Mattel Interactive	Windows	Unreleased	2000	Unreleased	
PokéROM	Basis Applied Technology	The Learning Company, Mattel Interactive	Macintosh	Unreleased	2000	Unreleased	
Pocket Monsters Sūji o Tsukamaeyō!	Sega Toys	Sega Toys	Sega Pico	July 23, 2002	Unreleased	Unreleased	
Pocket Monsters Advanced Generation Hiragana Katakana Kakechatta!	Sega Toys	Sega Toys	Sega Pico	September 24, 2003	Unreleased	Unreleased	
Pokémon Masters Arena	ImaginEngine	ValuSoft	Windows	Unreleased	January 1, 2004	Unreleased	
Pocket Monsters Advanced Generation Minna de Piko Pokémon Waiwai Battle!	Sega Toys	Sega Toys	Sega Pico	July 16, 2004	Unreleased	Unreleased	
Pocket Monsters Advanced Generation Pokémon Super Drill 1 kara 20 made no Kazu o Manabō!!	Sega Toys	Sega Toys	CoCoPad	July 11, 2005	Unreleased	Unreleased	
Pocket Monsters Advanced Generation Pokémon Sūji Battle!!	Sega Toys	Sega Toys	Advanced Pico Beena	October 1, 2005	Unreleased	Unreleased	
Pokémon Team Turbo	ImaginEngine	ValuSoft	Windows	Unreleased	October 28, 2005	Unreleased	
Pokémon Garden	Bascule	Yahoo! Japan	Browser game	July 7, 2006	Unreleased	Unreleased	
Pokémon Team Rocket Blast Off	Left Brain Games	Garr Group	Browser game	Unreleased	2006	Unreleased	
Pokémon Poké Ball Launcher	Left Brain Games	Garr Group	Browser game	Unreleased	2006	Unreleased	
Pokémon Seek & Find	Left Brain Games	Garr Group	Browser game	Unreleased	2006	Unreleased	
Chiiku Drill Pocket Monsters Diamond Pearl Moji Kazu Chie Asobi	Sega Toys	Sega Toys	Advanced Pico Beena	April 21, 2007	Unreleased	Unreleased	
Pocket Monsters Diamond Pearl Pokémon o Sagase! Meiro de Daibōken!	Sega Toys	Sega Toys	Advanced Pico Beena	September 17, 2009	Unreleased	Unreleased	
Pocket Monsters Best Wishes Chinō Ikusei Pokémon Daiundōkai	Sega Toys	Sega Toys	Advanced Pico Beena	December 4, 2010	Unreleased	Unreleased	

== See also ==
- List of Nintendo Entertainment System games
- List of Famicom Disk System games
- List of Super Nintendo Entertainment System games
- List of Super Game Boy games
- List of Satellaview broadcasts
- List of Nintendo 64 games
- List of GameCube games
- List of Wii games
- List of Wii U games
