= Wario's Woods =

1994 video game

- North American NES box art
- Developers: Nintendo R&D1 (NES); Intelligent Systems (Super NES, Satellaview)
- Publisher: Nintendo
- Director: Kenji Miki
- Producer: Kenji Miki
- Designers: Soichiro Tomita; Masahiro Iimura; Naotaka Ohnishi
- Composers: Shinobu Amayake (NES); Soyo Oka (NES); Hiroaki Suga (Super NES); Tadashi Ikegami (Super NES)
- Series: Wario
- Platforms: NES, Super NES, Satellaview
- Release: JP: February 19, 1994; NA: December 10, 1994; EU: 1995
- Genre: Puzzle
- Modes: Single-player, multiplayer

Wario's Woods, known in Japan as Wario's Forest, (Note: Japanese: ワリオの森, Hepburn: Wario no Mori) is a 1994 puzzle video game developed by Nintendo R&D1 and Intelligent Systems and published by Nintendo for the Nintendo Entertainment System (NES) and Super Nintendo Entertainment System (Super NES). A spin-off of the Mario series, players control Toad in his mission to defeat Wario, who has taken control of the Peaceful Woods. Gameplay revolves around clearing each level by using bombs to destroy groups of enemies. The game also features a multiplayer mode that allows two players to compete against each other.

The NES version is noteworthy for being the last officially-licensed game as well as the final first-party game for the system in North America, due to its release at the end of the console's lifespan. It is also the only NES game to receive a rating from the Entertainment Software Rating Board (ESRB), which was inducted almost three months before the game's American release. In Japan, the game was released alongside a re-release of The Legend of Zelda to coincide with the release of the AV Famicom.

Wario's Woods has been re-released several times for other platforms, such as the Satellaview and the Virtual Console. The game received mixed reviews from critics, who praised its gameplay, design, and multiplayer mode, though some believed it was not as refined as Nintendo's previous puzzle games like Dr. Mario, and lacked depth and enough content to keep players engaged. It was released for the Nintendo Switch as a part of the Nintendo Classics service.

== Plot and gameplay ==
Screenshot of the single-player mode in the Super NES version. The player character Toad rearranges the objects in the playing field such that monsters and bombs of matching colors are placed adjacently in rows.

The "Peaceful Woods" was once a peaceful area for sprites and gentle creatures. After the invasion of Wario and his group of monsters, the forest community was "turned upside-down" where peaceful creatures are no longer welcome. To stop Wario, Toad arrives to stop him and return the Woods back over to the sprites by going after Wario himself.

The objective of Wario's Woods is to clear the playing field of monsters of varying colors by using bombs of matching color, which are dropped into the field from the top of the screen by a sprite. In order to do so, the monsters and bombs must be rearranged by the player such that three or more objects of the same color are placed adjacent to one another in horizontal, vertical, or diagonal rows, with at least one object being a bomb (such rows are called a "match"). For example, a match may consist of two red monsters and one red bomb, but may also consist of two red bombs and one red monster. However, a match cannot consist of three monsters of the same type. A Thwomp may also come down a number of rows (being disguised as the ceiling), making less room for the player to match enemies and bombs. When the play field is cleared of all the monsters, the player progresses to the next round, where the initial number of monsters increases. (Note: From the Operations Guide (5. Basic Play)) There are different monster types that can only be destroyed in specific ways, such as requiring two matches in quick succession or being placed into a diagonal match.

Unlike other action puzzle games such as Tetris or Puzzle League where the player directly manipulates the game pieces, either as they fall or via a cursor, the player directly controls the character Toad, who moves around inside the playing field atop the fallen objects. Toad can pick up individual objects or lift entire stacks and place them elsewhere in the playing field, but is unable to manipulate objects he cannot immediately reach. However, Toad can perform a variety of additional tricks, such as kicking objects across the play field and scurrying up the sides of stacks to retrieve specific objects. (Note: From the Operations Guide (2. Controls)) If the player cannot clear the playing field of its objects quickly enough, the play field will eventually fill to the brim and trap Toad, resulting in a Game Over.

The game has a multiplayer mode, called 'VS' or 'VS 2P', where the player can play against another player. In the multiplayer mode, players can make two or more matches after another to make a stack of enemies on their opponents field.

== Re-releases ==
Two modified versions of the Super NES version of Wario's Woods were released in Japan for the Satellaview, a satellite modem add-on for the Super Famicom. The first version was copyrighted in 1994 and released under the name Wario's Woods: Bakushou Version (ワリオの森 爆笑バージョン, Wario no Mori Bakushō Bājon). The Bakushou Version featured personalities from the Japanese radio comedy show, Bakushō Mondai.

The second version of Wario's Woods broadcast for Satellaview was released under the name Wario's Woods: Again (ワリオの森 再び, Wario no Mori: Futatabi). It was broadcast from April 23, 1995, to June 30, 2000, throughout the lifespan of the Satellaview. The game was quite popular and it was rebroadcast at least seven times throughout the tenure of St.GIGA's Satellaview-broadcasting period. The game was also broadcast at least once as one of the Satellaview's special event versions.

The NES version of Wario's Woods is available as a collectible item in the 2001 game Animal Crossing for the GameCube, obtained through use of the GameCube – Game Boy Advance link cable. This version was one of the first titles available for the Wii Virtual Console, released alongside the service's launch in North America, Australia, and Europe, and on December 12, 2006, in Japan. It was available for purchase at the Wii Shop Channel for 500 Nintendo Points. It was released for the eShop in Japan on May 29, 2013, for the Nintendo 3DS and on January 29, 2014, for the Wii U, in Europe for the 3DS on October 24, 2013, and for the 3DS and the Wii U eShop in North America on November 7, 2013. The game was added to the Nintendo Classics service on December 13, 2018.

== Reception ==
Reviews

Aggregate score
Aggregator	Score		
Aggregator	NES	SNES	Wii
GameRankings	70% (4 retrospective reviews)	N/A	N/A

Review scores
Publication	Score		
Publication	NES	SNES	Wii
AllGame	4/5	3.5/5	N/A
Eurogamer	N/A	N/A	2/5
Famitsu	6/10, 5/10, 6/10, 5/10	N/A	N/A
GameSpot	N/A	N/A	7.0/10
IGN	N/A	N/A	8.0/10
Next Generation	N/A	2/5	N/A
Nintendo Life	N/A	N/A	6/10

Wario's Woods has received mixed reviews. Reviewing the Super NES version, GamePro called it "a ho-hum puzzler", commenting that though it has some interesting gameplay mechanics, it ultimately fails to be more than a standard Tetris clone. They also regarded the controls as difficult. Nintendo Power reviewed the game noting that it had a fun two-player mode and was challenging and fast-paced while saying that it's not as easy to control as Tetris 2. For the individual scores, the game ranked scores evenly for graphic and sound for both systems, but gave slightly higher scores for the Super NES in the Play Control, Challenge, and Theme and Fun categories. A reviewer for Next Generation argued that the gameplay mechanics are too complicated for an action puzzle game and that the learning curve in the game is "too steep".

In retrospective reviews, Allgame rated Wario's Woods 4 stars out of 5 for the NES version, and 3.5 stars out of 5 for the Super NES version. Christian Huey, who reviewed the NES version, wrote that the controls were "both surprisingly complex and completely intuitive" while the gameplay has a "surprising level of depth", and labeled the two-player versus mode as welcome addition to the game. Scott Alan Marriott, who reviewed the Super NES version, felt that the game "doesn't quite measure up to the addictiveness of either Tetris or Dr. Mario", citing the game's "extremely awkward" controls and complicated gameplay. While Marriott appreciated "that the developers were trying something new", he also argued that sometimes when adding things to an already proven formula for action puzzle games can work, it can also "dilute" the ingredients that made the game a success.

The reviews for the Virtual Console release were mixed, applauding the gameplay and depth, but criticizing the choice to release the primitive NES version over the more comprehensive Super NES version. Lucas Thomas of IGN awarded the game an 8.0 out of 10, praising the game's unique approach to the puzzle genre and graphics that "took full advantage of the 8-bit hardware [and were] full of character", but recommended saving Nintendo Points for the Super NES version. Aaron Thomas of GameSpot gave Wario's Woods a score of 7.0 out of 10, admiring the "fun, addictive game play" and "surprising amount of depth", but criticizing the game's repetitive music and poor sound effects, adding that he also prefers the "ideal" Super NES version. Nintendo Life scored the game 6 out of 10, stating that while the game is fun, he noted the game's length to be short. IGN ranked the game 29th on their "Top 100 SNES Games of All Time".
