= Lists of Nintendo products =

Nintendo is a Japanese multinational video game company headquartered in Kyoto. It develops, publishes, and manufactures both video games and video game consoles. Nintendo began in 1889 when craftsman Fusajiro Yamauchi founded the company to produce handmade hanafuda playing cards. After venturing into various lines of business and becoming a public company, Nintendo began producing toys in the 1960s, and later, video games.

Lists of Nintendo products by category are as follows:

- List of Nintendo arcade video games
- List of Nintendo home video games
- List of Nintendo handheld video games
- List of Nintendo hybrid console video games
- List of non-video game Nintendo products
