= Camp Hyrule =

Online virtual summer camp

- Website type: Virtual camp / Internet forum
- Owner: Nintendo of America
- Creators: Nintendo and Lithium Technologies
- Website: CampHyrule.com (archived)
- Commercial: Yes
- Launched: August 15, 1995
- Current status: Down

Camp Hyrule was an annual online virtual camp that was sponsored and moderated by Nintendo of America. It first opened in the summer of 1995, and emerged as Nintendo's biggest online event. Camp Hyrule, which was usually held in August, allowed Nintendo fans to chat, play online games, and win prizes under the supervision of Nintendo employees and Nintendo Power columnists. The camp's name is named after the fictional land of Hyrule, a prominent and recurring setting in The Legend of Zelda series. The last camp was in 2007, with no plans to host another Camp Hyrule.

== Background ==
Essentially an online simulation of a summer camp, Camp Hyrule had refined many traditional outdoor themes, such as campfires, water sports, and archery into many Java-based games. Participants were assigned to cabins, where they worked with other teammates to earn points by participating in games, Photoshop contests, and other activities. After the camp session ended, the cabin with the most points won a special prize, while runner-up cabins received other consolation prizes.

The camp was also used to promote various Nintendo-related products. In past years, some of the camp's games have revolved around 1080° Avalanche, the Game Boy Advance SP, and Donkey Konga. Additionally, the camp had a theme, related to an upcoming video game, that often prompted mini-story line. For example, in 2005, the camp's design and layout reflected the upcoming Legend of Zelda: Twilight Princess. Nintendo went to further detail to add a story line to that camp session, in which games and layouts were mysteriously vanishing at the hands of an evil force. Nevertheless, all the issues were always resolved at the camp's closing ceremony, where awards and grand prize winners were announced.

Camp Hyrule was moderated and maintained by Nintendo of America's online staff. Staff members, called counselors, were responsible for moderating their assigned cabin's message board and chat rooms, while also advocating participants to earn points. The camp's staff also sent participants daily emails pertaining to earning points or the camp's plot developments. Nintendo later turned to the NSider Forums, their official online community, in order to provide additional moderators. Camp Hyrule also had a mascot, named Stumpy, who was often seen wandering the campgrounds.

The community elements were removed from Camp Hyrule in 2007, coinciding with the closing of the NSider forums and the impending switch from in-house publication of Nintendo Power to publication by Future US, which occurred in November 2007.

== Registration ==
Nintendo generally opened registration for Camp Hyrule in late July or early August. Although there was no limit as to how many users could sign up, registration was only open for one week. Registration required a "My Nintendo" account, which Nintendo has since phased out to bring Club Nintendo to the US.

The 2007 camp was open from August 13 to August 23 to all My Nintendo members, and registration was not required.

== Landmarks ==
Camp Hyrule features several landmarks which have appeared year after year on the campgrounds:

- NOA HQ, a chatroom exclusive to Nintendo of America employees. It also serves as the camp's command center.
- Trading Post, an area where updates regarding announcements, contests, and other miscellaneous information are disseminated to users by camp counselors.
- First Aid Hut, an area which offers users technical support.
- The Amphitheater, a chatroom which hosts special events, such as interviews from Nintendo officials, and the camp's annual closing ceremony.
- Lake Webaconda, an area which features games related to water sport activities, such as fishing and boating.
- The Bonfire, usually the camp's largest "general discussion" chat room.
- Stumpy's Stable, where users can play a game in which they feed Stumpy, the camp's mascot.
- The Lost Woods, a chatroom for discussion of The Legend of Zelda series, often secretly used by the majority of the veterans from the "Trivia HQ", one of the Live Chats on the NSider forums during Camp Hyrule as a substitute place to chat. The Annual Lost Woods Trivia was also hosted here by TSA.
- Maniac's Cave, a secret chatroom inside Camp Hyrule. The Camp Maniac would occasionally come out and boot everyone out of the chatroom.
- Kirby's Mess Hall, a chat formerly called "Mess Hall" until Kirby took over. Users were virtually fed "food" and it was a general discussion chat.
- Mr. Pickle's Crib, a chat only open to NOA Shaun when he decides to use it.

== History ==
- Camp Hyrule was first held from August 15 to August 19, 1995, on AOL.
- In 1997, Camp Hyrule was moved from AOL to www.nintendo.com
- In 1999, Camp Hyrule moved to the more familiar "www.camphyrule.com".
- Beginning with the 2000 camp, campgrounds were designed around a theme based on an upcoming console or game release. The first theme used was Majora's Mask.
- In 2000, Camp Hyrule began the tradition of ending each year's camp with a disaster.
- In 2002, registration quotas were finally removed due to popular request. Prior to 2002, Camp Hyrule was limited to the 500-2000 registrants, thus causing intense competition and often overloading the servers.
- In 2002, a majority of the camp's themes were renamed to make the camp more Nintendo related.
- In 2005, each member of the winning cabin received a free Stumpy T-shirt.
- In 2006, due to glitches the closing ceremonies were delayed for two hours.
- In 2006, all campers were entered into a sweepstakes to win a Wii.
- In 2007, the site's administrators announced they will remove Camp Hyrule's community elements. Also, all participants in the United States were able to enter a sweepstakes to win a life-size Link statue.
- The 2008 event was nonexistent.
- In 2009, the Camp Hyrule page originally directed to the Nintendo.com home page, though it eventually relaunched in the archived 2007 format.

=== Summary of past camps ===
Year	Held	Signup	Theme	Highlights	Winner
2007 (13th)	August 13–23 at www.camphyrule.com (open indefinitely)	No sign ups required.	None	Campers were entered into a sweepstakes to win a life-size Link statue.	N/A
2006 (12th)	August 14–18 at www.camphyrule.com	July 25–28	Super Mario Galaxy	The camp was moved into outer space, only to be attacked by meteor showers, a space virus epidemic, asteroids, and a black hole. On the last day, the camp slipped through a wormhole, and was warped into the 1998 campground.	Cabin 9
2005 (11th)	August 15–19 at www.camphyrule.com	July 26–28	The Legend of Zelda: Twilight Princess	All of Camp Hyrule has fallen under the dark shadow of the Twilight Realm. A fire broke out on the last day, burning the camp.	Cabin 9
2004 (10th)	August 16–20 at www.camphyrule.com	July 27–30	Nintendo DS	The Solar panels on the DS factory were destroyed, and the campsite suffered a flash flood on the last day of camp. Camp Hyrule 2004 Map.	Cabin 1
2003 (9th)	August 15-August 19 at www.camphyrule.com	July 27–29	1080° Avalanche	The infamous King K. Rool devastated the camp with a massive earthquake; Also, a mysterious metroid haunted the camp's loft Camp Hyrule 2003 Map.	Cabin 2
2002 (8th)	August 17–21 at www.camphyrule.com	July 28–30	Super Mario Sunshine	The campsite was plagued with graffiti and litter, which was gradually cleaned up as the week progressed.	Cabin 5
2001 (7th)	August 13–17 at www.camphyrule.com	August 2; first 2000 only	GameCube	The GameCube's blueprints were mysteriously stolen; on the last day Bowser wrecked camp. More 2001 CH info. Archived '01 layout.	Cabin 9
2000 (6th)	August 7–11 at www.camphyrule.com	first 1000 only	The Legend of Zelda: Majora's Mask	On the last day of camp, the moon from Majora's Mask fell on the campsite, forcing an abrupt evacuation. More 2000 CH info. Archived '00 layout.	Cabin 3
1999 (5th)	August 16–20 at www.camphyrule.com	?	None	Known as the "Invalid Login" year. More 1999 CH info. Archived '99 layout.	Cabin 16
1998 (4th)	August 24–28 at www.nintendo.com	August 18	Pokémon	?	Cabin 19
1997 (3rd)	August 18–22 at www.nintendo.com	August 11	None	A mysterious fiend flew NOA Dan's boxers. They were stolen the next day, resulting in a desperate scavenger hunt to reclaim them. More 1997 CH info.	?
1996 (2nd)	August 12–17 via AOL	August 5	?	?	?
1995 (1st)	August 11 via AOL	?	?	?	?
