= 4 Nin Uchi Mahjong =

1984 mahjong video game

- Japanese box art
- Developer: Hudson Soft
- Publisher: Nintendo
- Programmer: Masahiro Tobita
- Platform: Family Computer
- Release: JP: November 2, 1984
- Genre: Mahjong
- Mode: Single-player

4 Nin Uchi Mahjong (Note: Japanese: ４人打ち麻雀, Hepburn: 4 Nin Uchi Mahjong; lit. "Four Player Strike Mahjong") is a 1984 mahjong video game developed by Hudson Soft and published by Nintendo for the Family Computer. It was released exclusively in Japan. It is the third mahjong game published by Nintendo, following the handheld electronic game Computer Mah-jong Yakuman and the 1983 video game Mah-Jong.

== Gameplay ==
The typical initial setup

The game consists of Japanese mahjong (also known as riichi mahjong) against one to three computer opponents. Spreading to the majority of mahjong-related video games after this one, it has become the most widely accepted form of mahjong to the Japanese gamer. The "tiles remaining counter" served as a reminder to players about the status of the wall.

== Reception ==
1,450,000 copies have been sold in Japan.
