= Mah-Jong =

1983 video game

- Family Computer box art
- Developer: Nintendo R&D2
- Publisher: Nintendo
- Platforms: Family Computer, Nintendo Entertainment System, arcade, Famicom Disk System
- Release: Family Computer: JP: August 27, 1983; Arcade (VS. Mah-Jong): JP: February 1984; Famicom Disk System: JP: February 21, 1986; Nintendo Entertainment System: HK: 1987
- Genre: Mahjong
- Modes: Single-player, multiplayer
- Arcade system: Nintendo VS. System

Mah-Jong (Note: Japanese: 麻雀, Hepburn: Mahjong) is a 1983 mahjong video game developed and published by Nintendo for the Family Computer. It was released on August 27, 1983 in Japan alongside Gomoku Narabe Renju. It was followed by a port to Nintendo VS. System arcades titled VS. Mah-Jong released in February 1984 as well as the Famicom Disk System on February 21, 1986. The game also released in Hong Kong sometime in 1987 for the Nintendo Entertainment System. It was followed by a series of sequels, beginning with 4 Nin Uchi Mahjong in 1984 for the Famicom.

== Gameplay ==
The game consists of Japanese mahjong (also known as riichi mahjong) against a computer opponent. The "tiles remaining counter" serves as a reminder to players about the status of the wall. The game has three difficulty levels, with the easiest mode stopping players from making various mistakes as a tutorial and the hardest applying harsh time limits to calling and playing tiles. Due to technical limitations at the time, the game was reworked to involve two people instead of the expected four players, which was addressed by the release of 4 Nin Uchi Mahjong.

== Re-releases ==
The Family Computer version is playable in the Japanese version of Animal Crossing for the GameCube. It was also re-released on the Nintendo Classics service on July 4, 2024. Hamster Corporation released the arcade version as part of their Arcade Archives series for the Nintendo Switch in February 2020; this was the game's first release outside Japan.
