= Nintendo Research & Development =

Nintendo Research & Development was a division within Nintendo created in the 1970s. It was later dissolved on September 30, 2003.

The division was divided into four departments:

- Nintendo Research & Development 1 - developed arcade games, the Game & Watch series, the Game Boy line, and various video games
- Nintendo Research & Development 2 - developed video game consoles such as the Nintendo Entertainment System and Super Nintendo Entertainment System, as well as video games and hardware peripherals
- Nintendo Research & Development 3 - developed arcade games and the Nintendo 64
- Nintendo Research & Development 4 - developed video games for home consoles
