= Tetris 2 (1993 video game) =

1993 video game

- North American NES cover art
- Developer: Tose
- Publishers: Nintendo (NES, Game Boy, Super NES); Bullet-Proof Software (Super Famicom)
- Producer: Gunpei Yokoi
- Composers: Mitsuhiko Takano; Miyuki Uemura
- Series: Tetris
- Platforms: Game Boy, NES, Super NES
- Release: September 21, 1993: NES; JP: September 21, 1993; NA: October 1993; EU: 1993; BR: 1994 Game Boy; NA: December 1993; JP: June 14, 1994; EU: October 27, 1994 Super NES; JP: July 8, 1994; NA: July 1994; EU: 1995
- Genre: Puzzle
- Modes: Single-player, multiplayer

Tetris 2, known in Japan as Tetris Flash (Note: Japanese: テトリスフラッシュ, Hepburn: Tetorisu Furasshu), is a 1993 puzzle video game developed by Tose and published by Nintendo for the Nintendo Entertainment System. It was ported to the Game Boy in 1993 and the Super Nintendo Entertainment System in 1994.

== Gameplay ==
The gameplay is a variation of the Tetris concept. Blocks descend from the top of the screen as tetrominos. However, rather than aiming to fill the horizontal lines with blocks, the player aims to match the colors of the descending blocks to those of blocks already on the game board. When three blocks of the same color are matched, blocks disappear from the board in a way reminiscent of the game Dr. Mario. Also, unlike in Tetris, the squares in the tetromino blocks are not always adjacent to other squares; some only connect to other squares at the corners.

== Reception ==
Reception

Aggregate score
Aggregator	Score
GameRankings	85.83% (SNES); 74% (GB)

Review scores
Publication	Score
Famitsu	21/40(NES); 5/10, 6/10, 6/10, 6/10 (GB)
Electronic Gaming Monthly	6/10, 7/10, 6/10, 6/10 (NES); 9/10, 8/10, 8/10, 7/10, 8/10 (SNES)
Game Players	52% (NES)
GamePro	5/5 (SNES)

In the United States, Tetris 2 was the top-selling NES and Game Boy game in January 1994, and the top Game Boy game in February. In the United Kingdom, it was the top-selling NES game for eight months in 1994, in March and then from May through summer and autumn to November. It was also the top-selling Game Boy game in August 1994.

The four reviewers in Electronic Gaming Monthly found the NES version of the game to have poor quality graphics and that it was not as strong as the more popular versions of the first Tetris release.

Electronic Gaming Monthly recommended the Super NES version of the game if they were fans of the original game, praising the background graphics and the two-player mode. Nintendo Power found the SNES version of the game similar, but superior to both the Game Boy and NES release, giving SNES owners "the best Tetris experience for any game or computer system". The only drawback they had was that the game lacked the Russian music from the original game, which was replaced by "some rather sad tunes." The magazine Game Players found the NES version of Tetris 2 "a disappointing attempt for puzzle fans who have patiently waited for this sequel."

Nintendo Power complimented the Game Boy release of Tetris 2 a challenging action puzzle game highlighting the ability to play with two players via a Game Link Cable. They found the release had generally "bland graphics" and was not different enough from similar games like Tetris or Dr. Mario.

== See also ==
- List of Tetris variants
