= Dance Aerobics =

1987 music video game

- North American cover art
- Developer(s): Human Entertainment
- Publisher(s): JP: Bandai; NA: Nintendo
- Platform(s): Nintendo Entertainment System
- Release: JP: February 26, 1987; NA: March 1989
- Genre(s): Music game, exercise
- Mode(s): Single-player

Dance Aerobics, released in Japan as Aerobics Studio (エアロビスタジオ, Earobi Sutajio), is a music video game developed by Human Entertainment for the Nintendo Entertainment System. It was released in Japan by Bandai in February 1987 and North America by Nintendo in March 1989. It is the third game in Bandai's Family Trainer series, which was designed for use with the NES' 3x4 dance mat, the Power Pad, making it similar to the rhythm game genre, a genre that would later explode into the mainstream gaming market at the tail end of the 1990s.

== Gameplay ==
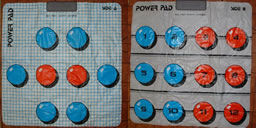
The Power Pad's 3x4 Side B (right) was used for all modes of Dance Aerobics.

Dance Aerobics features three distinct modes. In Normal Mode, the player begins with four different aerobics classes to choose from and by playing through the classes may unlock an additional 4. The player must follow the motions of the instructor by stepping on the appropriate buttons on the Power Pad as music plays. The player may also use their hands and in some more advanced levels and in different modes use of the hands is required. In Normal Mode, the score begins at 100 and decreases by 10 with each mistake, only going up for routines completed correctly. If the counter reaches zero then the player has failed the song. The games begin simply but as the player passes levels, new harder songs are unlocked and the difficulty increases.

In the Pad Antics Mode, three games are available. In Tune Up, the central two buttons of the Power Pad are de-activated (to allow the player to stand upon them) and the 10 pads surrounding the player are assigned different musical notes. The player can compose their own melody in a free form style by stepping on the appropriate pads to produce the tones they wish to play. In Mat Melodies, the player stands on the center two pads and the game plays a short song to the player who then must repeat it back eidetically by hitting the appropriate pads in the same order. In Ditto, the game plays music and calls instructions about whether to use a hand or a foot to hit the appropriate pad in a Twister-like manner.

In Aerobics Mode, the 4 original songs from Normal Mode (Studio 5, Studio 10, Studio 15, and Studio 20) are all available and the scoring is the same except that when the counter reaches 0 the music continues and the player may continue to attempt to mimic the moves made by the instructor. There is no progression of levels and doing well in Aerobics Mode will not unlock any new content in this mode.
