= Power Pad =

Nintendo Entertainment System accessory

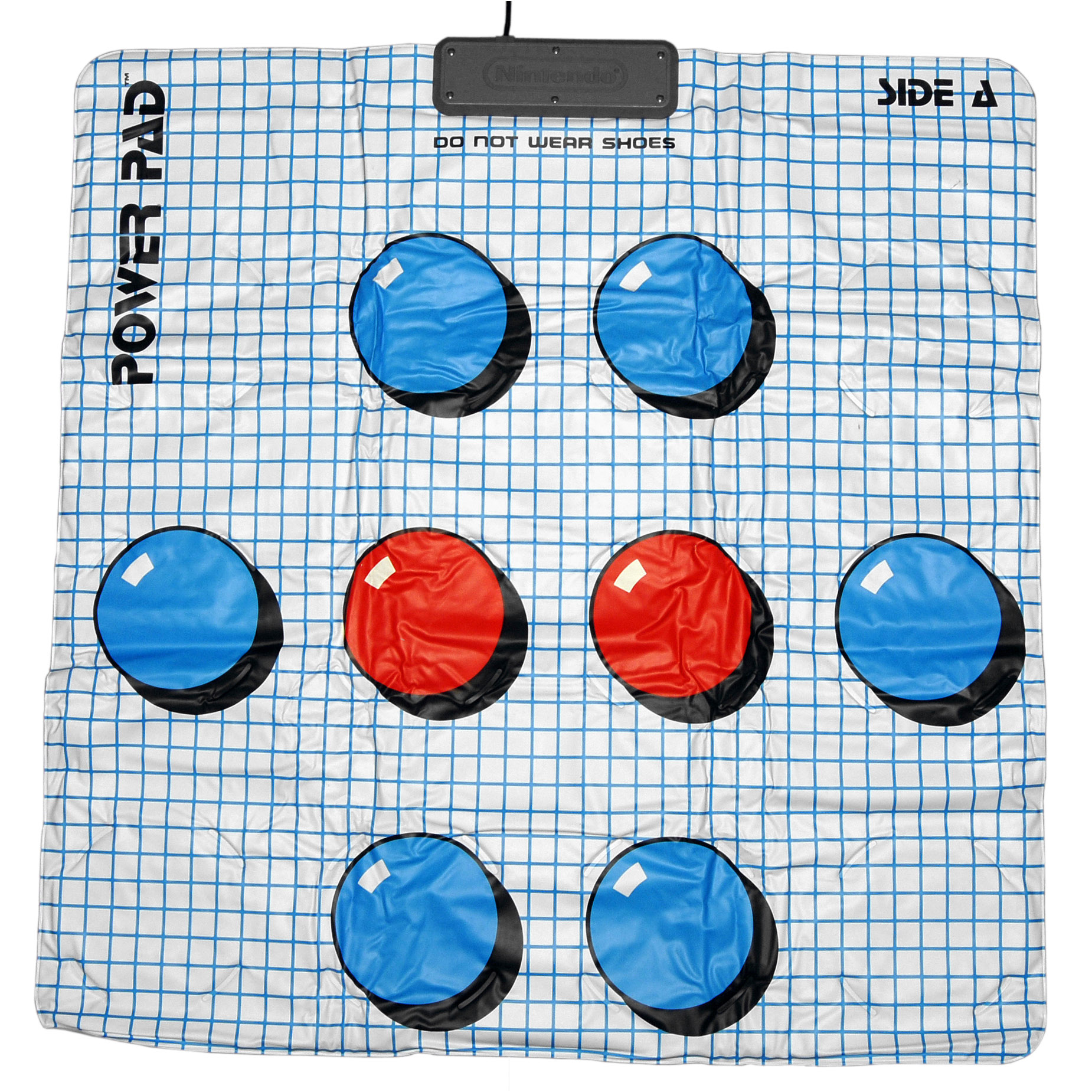
The Power Pad, Side A

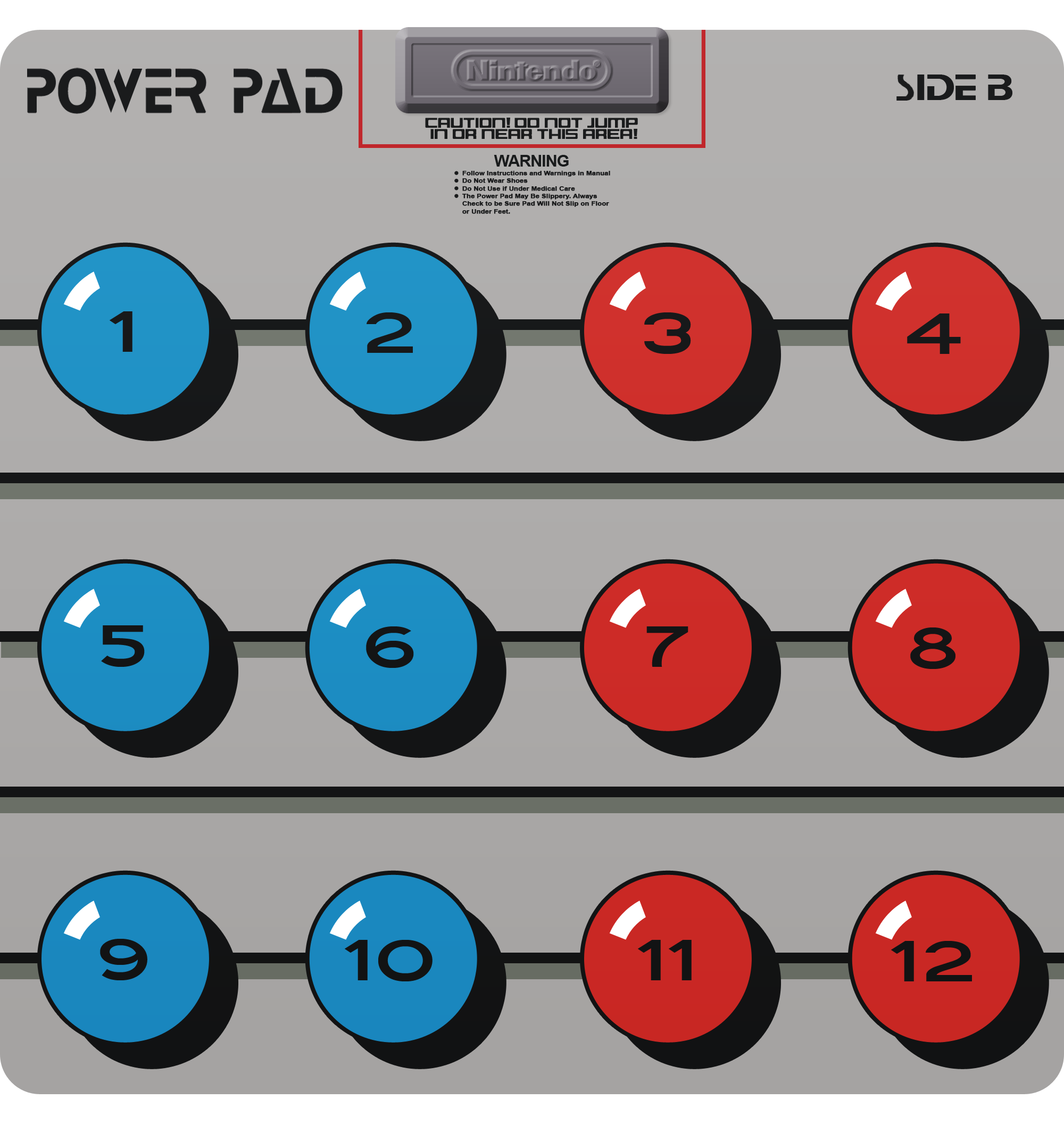
The Power Pad, Side B

The Power Pad (known in Japan as Family Trainer, and in Europe and briefly in the United States as Family Fun Fitness) is a floor mat game controller for the Nintendo Entertainment System. It is a gray mat with twelve pressure-sensors embedded between two layers of flexible plastic. It was originally developed by Bandai.

Bandai first released the accessory in 1986 as the Family Trainer pack for the Famicom in Japan, and later released in the United States. Nintendo released it in 1988 as the Power Pad, along with the game World Class Track Meet, which was a rebranding of an earlier game.

== Overview ==
The Power Pad was originally released by Bandai as the Family Trainer in Japan in 1986, and as the Family Fun Fitness both in North America and Europe in 1987 and 1988 respectively. In 1988, Nintendo acquired the rights from Bandai for the accessory in North America and renamed it the Power Pad, with the remaining Family Fun Fitness mats recalled from stores. Bandai retained the rights to the product outside of North America. The Power Pad sold 500,000 units in North America.

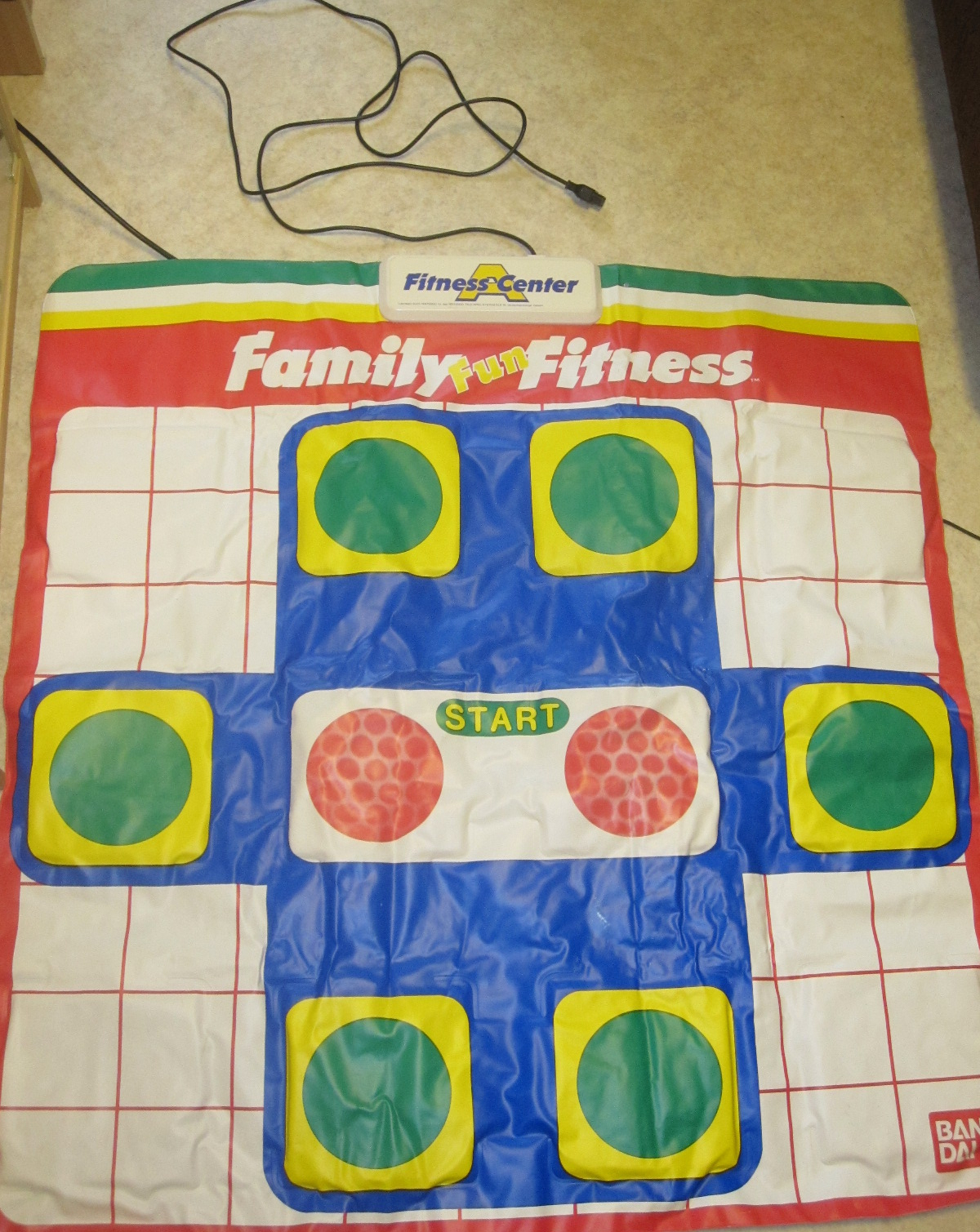
European version called Family Fun Fitness

The Power Pad accessory is laid out in front of the video display for various games, generally plugged into the second NES controller port, with players stepping on the large buttons to control gameplay. There are two illustrated sides to the pad: Side A, which is rarely used, has eight buttons, while side B has twelve buttons numbered 1–12.

Games using the Power Pad often test players on their timing and coordination, memory, "running" speed, or allow them to play music with their steps. Games such as Dance Dance Revolution can trace the lineage of their control mechanisms back to the Power Pad (see dance pad).

== Revival ==
In 2007, Namco Bandai Games announced that the Power Pad would see a reappearance for the original Wii. This version of the pad, called the Mat Controller, will also work in conjunction with the Wii Remote, and connects physically to the Wii console via its built-in GameCube controller ports. For later Wii models, including the Wii U, it is incompatible as they drop the GameCube ports. It was released along with Active Life: Outdoor Challenge in North America (known as Family Trainer Athletic World in Japan and Family Trainer in Europe) in 2008. Its sequel Active Life: Extreme Challenge was released in 2009. A third game, Active Life: Explorer, was released in 2010.

== Compatible games ==
The following is a list of all 11 video games which were created for use with the accessory. The games were developed by Human Entertainment except for the last three entries in the series. All but one of them were published by Bandai, though some were localized in North America by Nintendo.

Game	Details
Athletic World Original release date(s): JP: November 12, 1986; NA: July 1987; EU: June 15, 1988	Release years by system: Famicom, Nintendo Entertainment System
Athletic World Original release date(s): JP: November 12, 1986; NA: July 1987; EU: June 15, 1988	Notes: Athletic World (アスレチックワールド) was developed by Human Entertainment and published by Bandai in Japan in 1986 and in North America in 1987. Athletic World was the first of ten games Bandai released for the Family Trainer series. The first edition of the game in North America features the Family Fun Fitness logo on the label and box art, and also a mention of compatibility only with FFF accessory. Athletic World was the pack-in game bundled with the Family Fun Fitness. After Nintendo bought the rights to the Family Fun Fitness pad in North America, Bandai re-released Athletic World in 1989 with an updated different box art, this time displaying compatibility with the Power Pad. Unlike the box, the artwork on the label of the cartridge itself did not change for the reprint of the game although references about the Family Fun Fitness were removed from the sticker and replaced by a mention of compatibility with the Power Pad instead. No change at all was made to the ROM file for the second edition of Athletic World which retains the titlescreen and copyright from 1987 including the in-game mention "Family Fun Fitness". The original North American box art is now a rare item for collectors. On contemporary online websites, the average price for new or CIB copies of Athletic World is significantly higher for those that were released with the Family Fun Fitness compared to the Power Pad ones. But loose cartridges cost about the same price for either North American variant and both versions are typically more expansive than the Japanese carts of the game but less than their PAL counterpart. Athletic World simulates five different Olympic-style challenges — Hurdles, Hop A Log, Animal Trail, Rafting, and Dark Tunnel. Movements in the game are controlled by the player physically running, jumping, and stepping on the pad in a similar fashion to modern dance pad games. Each challenge is designed to train the player in a different manner. Hurdles tests the player on timing, while Dark Tunnel challenges the player's dexterity. This game also offers the unique feature of having players' game play experience tailored to them by asking for their Name, Age, Gender, and the current date to provide them with customized advice.
Running Stadium / Stadium Events / World Class Track Meet Original release date(s): Running Stadium: JP: December 23, 1986; Stadium Events: NA: September 1987; EU: February 23, 1990; World Class Track Meet: NA: August 1988	Release years by system: Famicom, NES
Running Stadium / Stadium Events / World Class Track Meet Original release date(s): Running Stadium: JP: December 23, 1986; Stadium Events: NA: September 1987; EU: February 23, 1990; World Class Track Meet: NA: August 1988	Notes: Running Stadium (ランニングスタジアム, Ranningu Sutajiamu) was published by Bandai and was released in Japan in 1986 and in North America in 1987 under the title Stadium Events. However, Nintendo purchased in 1988 the North American rights to the Family Fun Fitness series and decided to market this particular game themselves. As a result, Stadium Events was renamed and repackaged under the title World Class Track Meet, and copies of Bandai's Stadium Events were pulled from store shelves. The North American release of Stadium Events has become the hardest to find game available on the Nintendo Entertainment System. Stadium Events and World Class Track Meet are nearly identical to one another aside from the titlescreen. The game features an Olympics-style competition, with events such as the 100m dash, 110m hurdles, long jump, and triple jump. Race opponents were named after animals, the slowest being Turtle and the fastest being Cheetah.
Dance Aerobics Original release date(s): JP: February 26, 1987; NA: March 1989	Release years by system: Famicom, NES
Dance Aerobics Original release date(s): JP: February 26, 1987; NA: March 1989	Notes: Known as Aerobics Studio (エアロビスタジオ) in Japan, Dance Aerobics is the third game in Bandai's Family Trainer series, and is the only music game. Unlike the two previous installments and later Street Cop, this game was never published by Bandai in North America though it still saw a release in that region by Nintendo. Dance Aerobics features eight classes in the exercise studio. The player must follow the motions of the instructor. The score begins at 100 and decreases with each mistake. However, it goes up for each routine completed correctly.
Jogging Race Original release date(s): JP: May 28, 1987	Release years by system: Famicom
Jogging Race Original release date(s): JP: May 28, 1987	Notes: Jogging Race (ジョギングレース) is a Jogging and Hiking game released only in Japan, on May 28, 1987. It is the fourth game in Bandai's Family Trainer series.
Meiro Daisakusen Original release date(s): JP: July 31, 1987	Release years by system: Famicom
Meiro Daisakusen Original release date(s): JP: July 31, 1987	Notes: Meiro Daisakusen Maze Epic Battle (迷路大作戦) is a maze exploring game, released only in Japan on July 31, 1987. It is the fifth game in Bandai's Family Trainer series.
Street Cop Original release date(s): JP: August 31, 1987; NA: June 1989	Release years by system: Famicom, NES
Street Cop Original release date(s): JP: August 31, 1987; NA: June 1989	Notes: Released as Manhattan Police (マンハッタンポリス) in Japan, Street Cop is a game where the player has to chase after criminals while jumping over things and using the club to apprehend the foes. The player has to step on the buttons corresponding to each of the cop's actions, such as moving, jumping and clubbing. Street Cop was published by Bandai. It was released on August 31, 1987 in Japan and in June 1989 in North America.
Super Team Games Original release date(s): JP: November 27, 1987; NA: November 1988	Release years by system: Famicom, NES
Super Team Games Original release date(s): JP: November 27, 1987; NA: November 1988	Notes: Super Team Games (Famitore Daiundōkai (ファミトレ大運動会)) is a game that was published by Bandai in Japan and Nintendo in North America. Super Team Games consist of a group of different summer camp-style contests that utilized side B of the Power Pad/Family Trainer.
Totsugeki! Fūun Takeshi Jō Original release date(s): JP: December 28, 1987	Release years by system: Famicom
Totsugeki! Fūun Takeshi Jō Original release date(s): JP: December 28, 1987	Notes: Totsugeki! Fūun Takeshi Jō (突撃! 風雲たけし城) is a contest game based on the Japanese Television series game show/contest Takeshi's Castle. It was released only in Japan on December 28, 1987 and is the eighth game in Bandai's Family Trainer series.
Fūun! Takeshi Jō Two Original release date(s): JP: December 20, 1988	Release years by system: Famicom
Fūun! Takeshi Jō Two Original release date(s): JP: December 20, 1988	Notes: Fūun! Takeshi Jō Two (風雲! たけし城二(ツー), Fūun! Takeshi Jō Tsū) is the sequel to Totsugeki! Fūun Takeshi Jō and is also based on Takeshi's Castle with new contests. It was released on December 20, 1988 only in Japan and is the ninth game in Bandai's Family Trainer series.
Rai Rai! Kyonshis: Baby Kyonshi no Amida Daibōken Original release date(s): JP: January 26, 1989	Release years by system: Famicom
Rai Rai! Kyonshis: Baby Kyonshi no Amida Daibōken Original release date(s): JP: January 26, 1989	Notes: Rai Rai! Kyonshis: Baby Kyonshi no Amida Daibōken (来来! キョンシーズ。 ベビーキョンシーのあみだ大冒険, Come come! Fallen Corpses: Baby Fallen Corpse's Amedia Great Adventure) is the tenth and final game released for the Family Trainer series by Bandai, and it was released only in Japan on January 26, 1989.
Short Order / Eggsplode! Original release date(s): NA: December 1989	Release years by system: NES
Short Order / Eggsplode! Original release date(s): NA: December 1989	Notes: Short Order/Eggsplode! is a game compilation was developed and published by Nintendo — with no involvement from Bandai — in November 1989. Short Order, features gameplay similar to that of Atari's arcade game, Touch Me, and Milton Bradley's electronic memory game, Simon, where the player must build a hamburger by remembering the order of ingredients that the customer puts out. Eggsplode! involves a group of twelve hens on their nests and an anthropomorphic canine character that comes along and puts a bomb under them, the player must step on the appropriate position to extinguish the bombs before they explode, while ignoring the eggs laid by hens. This was the final game released for the Power Pad.

== See also ==
- Dance pad
- List of Nintendo Entertainment System accessories
