= Dance Dance Revolution Freedom =

Video game for iOS

- App logo
- Developer: Konami
- Publisher: Konami
- Series: Dance Dance Revolution
- Platform: iOS
- Release: NA: February 11, 2011
- Genre: Music
- Mode: Single-player

Dance Dance Revolution Freedom was a rhythm game by Konami originally made available for the iOS, as part of the company's Dance Dance Revolution series of music video games. The game was made available via Apple's App Store only in North America on February 11, 2011. The game is the second one in its series to be made available for the platform. It has since been pulled from the App Store for reasons unknown, but one factor may have been the poor syncing in the song's charts and the notoriety of the song's charts being poorly made that led to it being withdrawn a month after release. Naoki Maeda stated he was unaware of its existence until after it was released, indicating it was released without guidance from Konami Japan.

== Gameplay ==
Gameplay remains similar to other Dance Dance Revolution games, as players hit arrows to the beat of a selected song. Unlike other DDR titles (excluding Dance Dance Revolution S), Dance Dance Revolution Freedom uses a virtual dance pad on the device's touch screen instead of a full-fledged dance pad peripheral. Standard and course modes are available from the start, and an option, "Shake Mode", which uses the device's accelerometers for play.

== Music ==
Dance Dance Revolution Freedom soundtrack
Song	Artist
"Hot (Malibu Breeze Edit)"	Inna
"Riff"	Sander Van Doorn
"Duck. You Sucker"	Sharam
"Emotions"	George Acosta
