= Dance pad =

Flat electronic controller used for input in dance video games

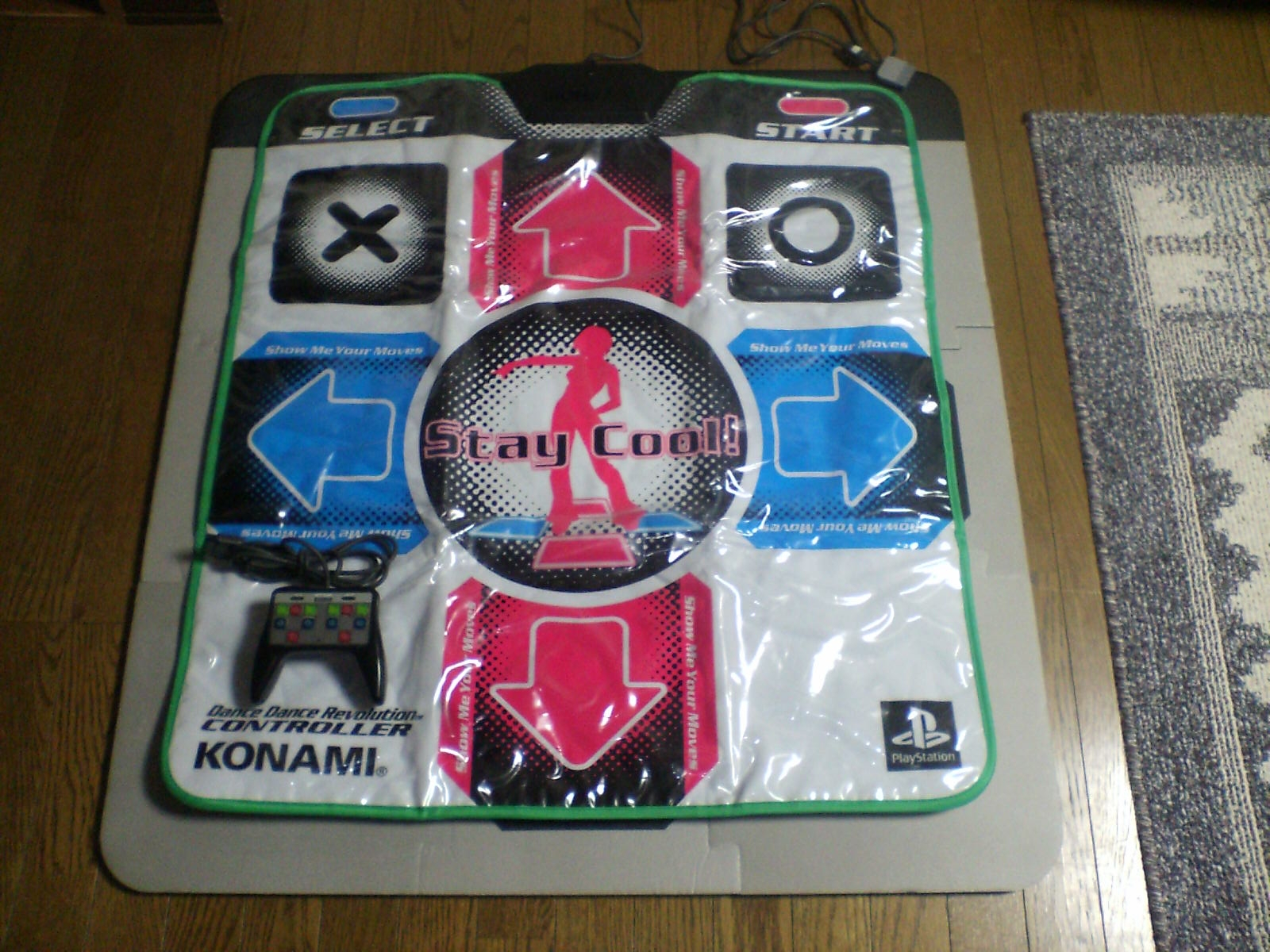
Dance platform for PlayStation version of DDR, with a hand controller in the lower left square for scale

Man using a dance pad

A dance pad, also known as a dance mat or dance platform, is a flat game controller that is placed on the floor and used to play music video games. Most dance pads are divided into a 3×3 matrix of square panels for the player to stand on, with some or all of the panels corresponding to directions or actions within the game. Some dance pads also have extra buttons outside the main stepping area, such as "Start" and "Select". Pairs of dance pads are often joined together for certain gameplay modes.

Popular arcade games, such as Dance Dance Revolution (DDR), In the Groove, Pump It Up, and StepManiaX use large steel dance platforms connected to the arcade cabinet, whereas versions for home consoles usually use smaller (often flexible) plastic pads. Home dance pads are made for systems such as the GameCube, Wii, Dreamcast (Japan only), PlayStation, PlayStation 2, and Xbox, but can also be used in computer emulators, such as StepMania, through the use of adapters.

== Types ==
=== Soft ===
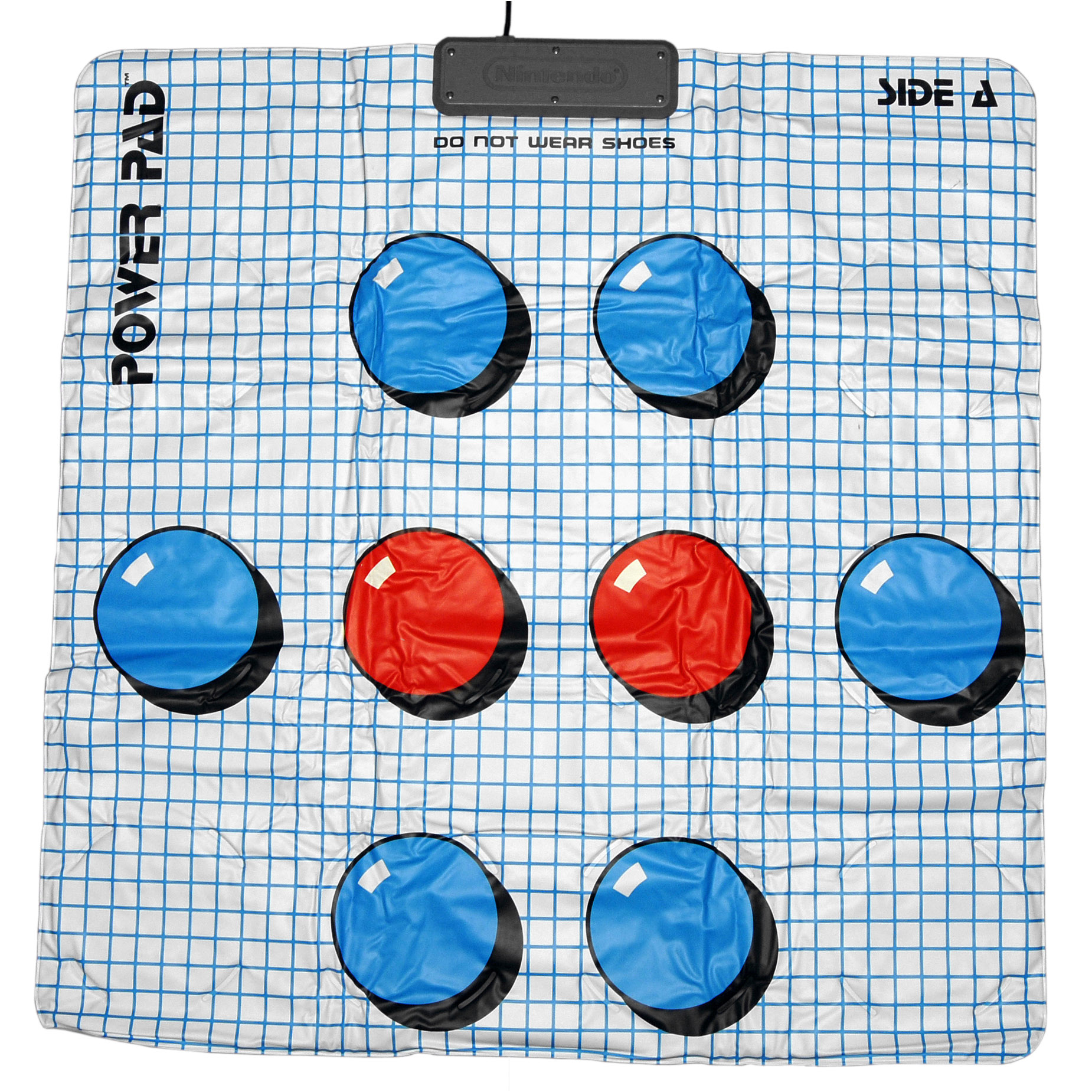
The 1987 Power Pad, a soft pad

"Soft" pads are thin and made of flexible plastic, generally costing $10–$20 USD. They are intended for light use in a casual setting and have been known to wear out easily. Manufacturers of soft pads include Konami, BNSUSA, RedOctane, Intec, Mad Catz (Beat Pad), MyMyBox, Naki, and Nintendo (Power Pad, Action Pad). OEM manufacturers include Futime and Topway (manufacturer of RedOctane pads).

Some soft pads contain rigid foam inserts for stability and durability. The inserts usually ship as multiple interlocking pieces to reduce the size of the packaging. These fit together using a dovetail joint and slide into the dance pad, which then zips closed around the foam. Certain brands of foam pads incorporate raised plastic sections under the directional buttons to allow them to be more easily felt by a player's feet, as well as to keep the player centered on the pad. These pads generally cost between $40 and $100.

=== Hard ===
"Hard" pads, as used with arcade machines, are usually constructed with metal (and sometimes wood) for durability. They typically come with a raised bar behind the player. Hard pads can be purchased for home use with a video game system; prices can range from anywhere between $100 and $1,000. Manufacturers of hard pads include DDRgame, Cobalt Flux, L-TEK, MyMyBox, Brown Box, RedOctane (who ceased production as of February 2010), and Naki.

Second-hand arcade hard pads often serve as an ideal base for DIY gamers to construct homebrew pads. Homebrew kits often consist of instruction guides for converting soft pads into hard pads, although they often feature additional functions such as additional inputs (see below).

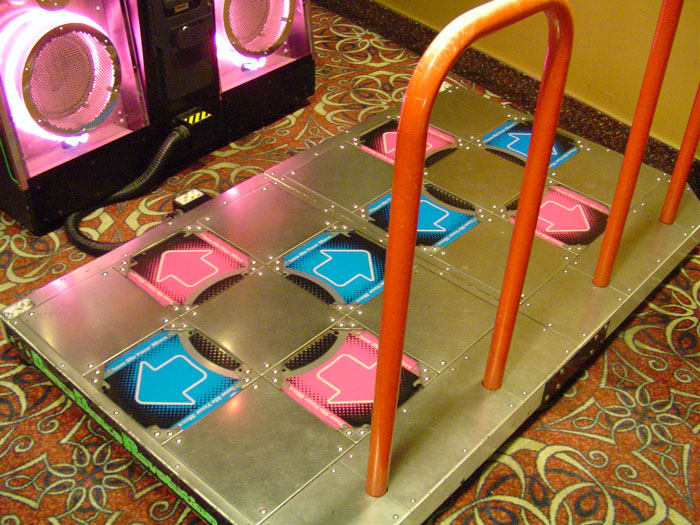
Dance Dance Revolution mats with buttons in orthogonal axis

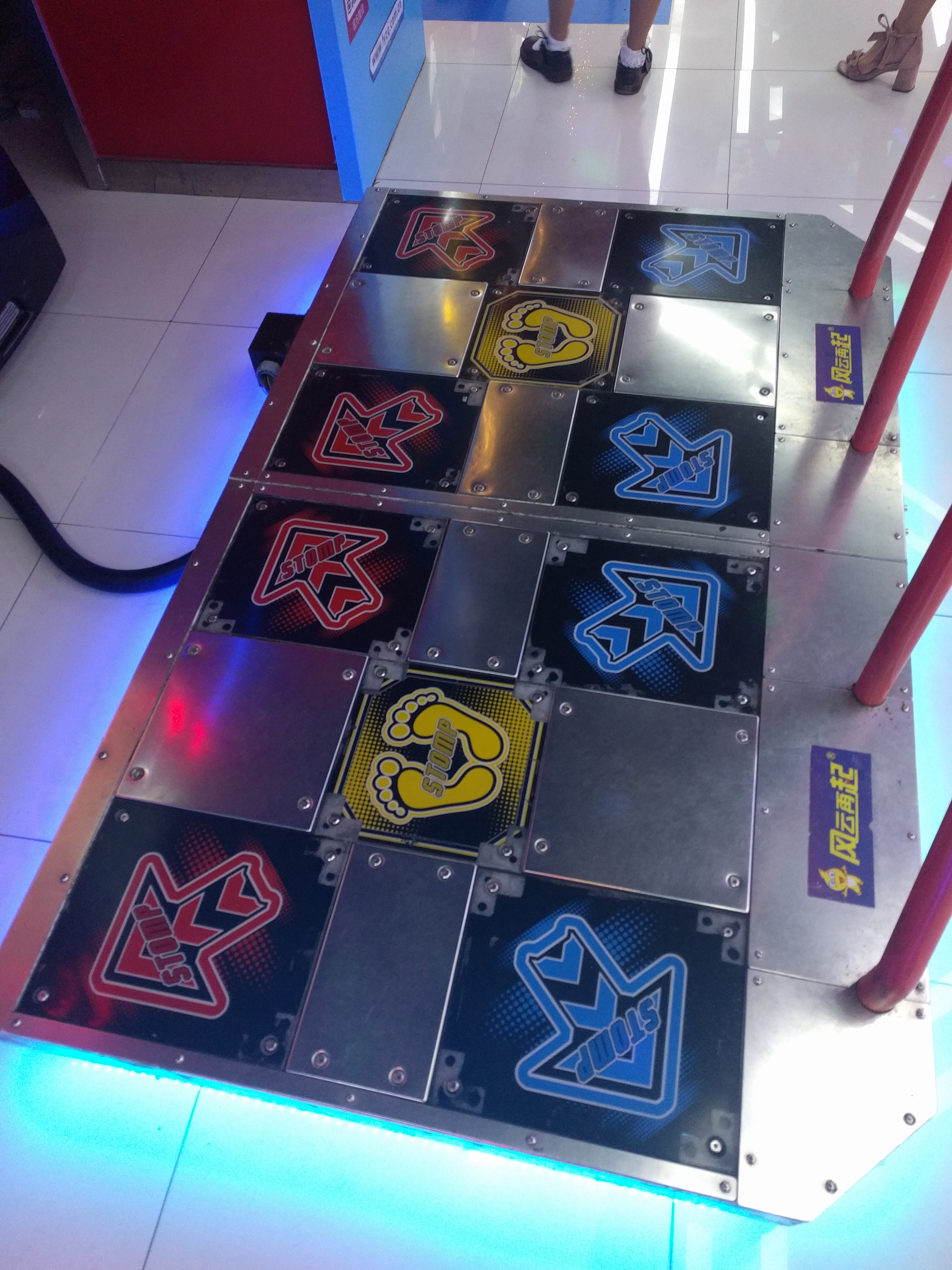
Pump It Up mats with buttons in diagonal axis

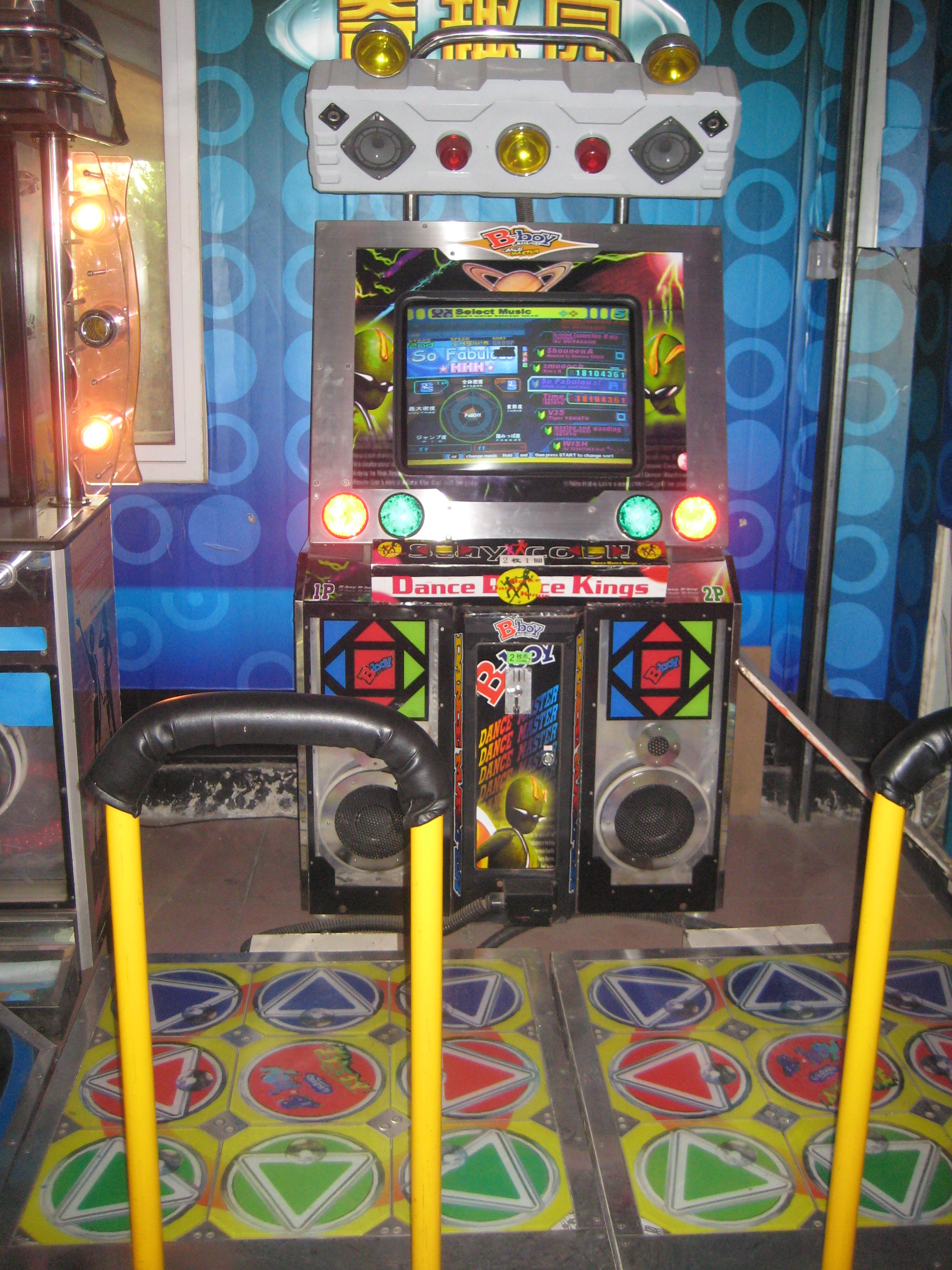
StepMania mats with buttons in both orthogonal and diagonal axis

=== Solid-state ===
Solid-state pads replace the usual mechanical switches and contacts with proximity sensors to detect the player's steps. Solid-state designs do not require pressure to activate, eliminating moving parts that might wear down faster, but are vulnerable to dirt.

=== Caveats ===
Problems are often encountered when attempting to use a PlayStation pad with a computer simulator. Most PlayStation-PC adapters will not register all of the directions on the pad simultaneously, as normal PlayStation games do not require such inputs and PlayStation D-pads are not designed for them. StepMania's website has a section concerning adapter compatibility. Although these devices may work on a PC, the adapters will not work with consoles that have built-in USB ports, such as the PlayStation 3 and the Xbox 360.

Purchasers of home pads should be aware of the number and arrangement of active arrow panels that are required by the game(s) they want to play. Although most commercial pads have four panels (DDR/In the Groove), some have five (Pump It Up), six, eight (MC Groovz Dance Craze), or nine.

== Homebrew pads ==
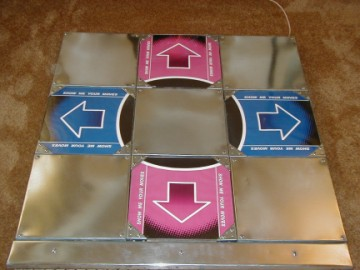
Homebrew DDR pad

Some players construct their own pads due to durability and cost concerns. Using common materials found at local hardware stores, such as plywood, sheet metal, and acrylic glass or polycarbonate, they are able to construct pads that are often more durable and authentic-feeling compared to commercially built hard pads. Some homebrew pads have extra features such as additional arrows, menu switches, pushbuttons, and bars. These are often made to be easily repaired and disassembled at home.

While some homebrew pads use custom electronics built from scratch, most homebrew pads make use of a circuit board from a standard controller to simplify the process of interfacing the pad with a gaming system. The controller used depends on the system that the pad is intended to be played with (GameCube, PlayStation, Xbox, or PC).

Homebrew pads use a variety of technologies for registering panel inputs. The most common design uses metal contacts that sandwich together when the player steps on the panel, but other ideas have been proposed, such as the use of optical, pressure, vibration, or proximity sensors.

Due to the amount of work needed to create a custom metal pad, some players instead opt to modify existing soft pads by stapling them to plywood or acrylic sheets or office chair floor protectors. This prevents wrinkling and makes the pad more durable when used with shoes.

== Other uses ==
Some games that can be played with dance pads do not involve pressing the arrow buttons on the pad to keep with the rhythm of a song:

- Active Life series for Wii (Active Life: Outdoor Challenge, Active Life: Explorer, Active Life: Extreme Challenge, Active Life: Magical Carnival)
- Breakthrough Gaming Presents: Axel
- Non-dance elements of Crypt of the NecroDancer
- Various mini-games in Dance Dance Revolution: Mario Mix
- Various mini-games in Dance Praise 2: The ReMix (such as DanceTris, a Tetris simulator)
- DDR-A-Mole, a game similar to Whac-A-Mole
- Exult (uses a Dance Pad Walking controller mod)
- Kraft Rocking the Boat
- Kraft Soccer Striker
- Kraft Virtual Dojo
- Non-dance elements of The Metronomicon: Slay the Dance Floor
- Many games developed for the NES Power Pad
- Non-dance elements of Vectronom

Dance pads have been used in experimental systems for navigating through virtual environments, such as those reproducing historical buildings.

== See also ==
- Wii Balance Board
