= H.a.n.d. =

Japanese video game developer

h.a.n.d. Inc.
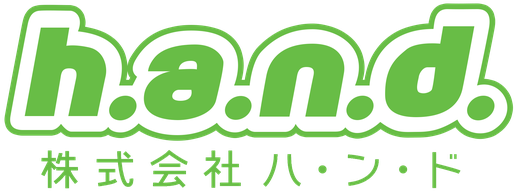
- Native name: ハ・ン・ド
- Romanized name: ha.n.do
- Type: Kabushiki gaisha
- Industry: Video games
- Founded: February 26, 1993
- Headquarters: Sapporo, Japan
- Key people: Teruaki Matoba, representative and president Toshinori Imata, director and vice-president
- Number of employees: 182 (2024/03)
- Website: www.hand.co.jp

h.a.n.d. Inc. (ハ・ン・ド, ha.n.do), abbreviation of Hokkaido Artists' Network and Development, is a Japanese video game developer. The company originally started as a service selling Macintosh hardware and software to universities before the Mac platform was widely known. When competition in the field increased, h.a.n.d. reorganized to develop original software.

h.a.n.d.'s earliest known game is Treasure Strike, developed in collaboration with publisher, Kid, who released the PC follow-up to the Dreamcast original in 2004. The company consists of two other divisions—North Point Inc. for the development of mobile phone apps and other software, and S.N.S. Inc. who work on social games for Facebook and Mixi for external publishers.

== List of games ==
Year	Title	Publisher	Platform(s)	Notes
2000	Treasure Strike	KID. Inc.	Dreamcast	
2004	Treasure Strike: Full Swing	KID. Inc.	Microsoft Windows	
2005	One Piece: Pirates Carnival	Bandai	PS2, GameCube	
2006	Tamagotchi: Party On!	Bandai	Wii	
2006	Final Fantasy Fables: Chocobo Tales	Square Enix	Nintendo DS	
2007	The World Ends With You	Square Enix	Nintendo DS	
2007	Saru! Get You! SaruSaru Big Mission	Sony Computer Entertainment	PSP	
2007	Tamagotchi no Furifuri Kagekidan!	Namco Bandai Games	Wii	
2007	Final Fantasy Fables: Chocobo's Dungeon	Square Enix	Wii	
2007	Oishiku Kiwameru Shokutsu DS	Square Enix	DS	
2008	Flower, Sun, and Rain: Murder and Mystery in Paradise	Marvelous Entertainment	DS	Original game and supervision by Grasshopper Manufacture
2008	Active Life: Outdoor Challenge	Namco Bandai Games	Wii	
2008	Cid to Chocobo no Fushigi na Dungeon Tokiwasure no Meikyu DS+	Square Enix	DS	
2008	Chocobo to Mahou no Ehon Majo to Shoujo to 5-nin no Yuusha	Square Enix	DS	
2009	Harvest Moon: My Little Shop	Marvelous Entertainment	WiiWare	Supervised by Marvelous Entertainment
2009	Mr. Brain	Square Enix	DSiWare	Supervised by Tokyo Broadcasting System
2009	Kingdom Hearts: 358/2 Days	Square Enix	DS	In cooperation with Square Enix.
2009	Puyo Puyo 7	Sega	DS, Wii, PSP	In cooperation with Sonic Team
2009	Sliding Heroes	Square Enix	iPod Touch, iPhone	
2010	Oyako de Asobo: Miffy no Omocha Bako	Square Enix	Wii	
2010	Chocobo’s Crystal Tower	Square Enix	GREE, Facebook	
2010	Kingdom Hearts Re:coded	Square Enix	DS (port)	In cooperation with Square Enix
2010	Active Life: Explorer	Namco Bandai Games	Wii	
2011	Imaginary Range	Square Enix	iOS	
2011	Sumaho Games 100	Catalyst Mobile KK.	Android	
2011	Decobito	GREE	Mobile	
2011	Cocoronococoron	Namco Bandai Games	DS	
2011	Puyo Puyo!! 20th Anniversary	Sega	DS, 3DS	In cooperation with Sonic Team
2011	Phantasy Star Eternal Planets	Sega	Yahoo! Mobage	
2012	Girl's RPG Cinderelife	Level 5	3DS	In cooperation with Gamedo Inc.
2012	Data Cardass Aikatsu!	Bandai	Arcade	Last update: January 21, 2016
2012	Fantasy Life	Level 5	Nintendo 3DS	In cooperation with Level 5 and Brownie Brown
2012	Tomodachi☆Dogs	GREE	Android, iOS	
2013	Toriko GourMegaBattle	Bandai Namco Games	Nintendo 3DS	
2013	Sennen Yusha: Tokiwatari no Tomoshibito	Square Enix	PC Browser	
2013	Fantasy Life Link!	Level 5	Nintendo 3DS	In cooperation with Level 5 and Brownie Brown
2013	Disney Magical World	Bandai Namco Games	Nintendo 3DS	
2014	Guruguru Tamagotchi!	Bandai Namco Games	Nintendo 3DS	
2014	Fairy Tail Brave Saga	Taito	Android, iOS	
2014	Aikatsu! 365 Nichi no Idol Days	Bandai Namco Games	Nintendo 3DS	
2014	Idol Chronicle	Taito	Android, iOS	
2015	Disney Magical World 2	Bandai Namco Entertainment	Nintendo 3DS	
2015	Aikatsu! My No.1 Stage	Bandai Namco Entertainment	Nintendo 3DS	
2015	JoJo's Bizarre Adventure: Eyes of Heaven	Bandai Namco Entertainment	PlayStation 4, PlayStation 3	Programming collaboration
2016	Naruto Shippuden: Ultimate Ninja Storm 4	Bandai Namco Entertainment	PlayStation 4	Programming & CG Animation Collaboration
2016	Bou Ningen Challenge!	Bandai Namco Entertainment	Nintendo 3DS	In cooperation with SNK Playmore
2018	Snack World: The Dungeon Crawl - Gold	Level-5	Nintendo Switch	In cooperation with Level-5
2018	The World Ends with You: Final Remix	Square Enix	Nintendo Switch, Android, iOS	Nintendo Switch and mobile port
2019	Gabbuchi	Aksys Games	PlayStation 4, Nintendo Switch, Microsoft Windows	
2019	Digimon Story Cyber Sleuth: Complete Edition	Bandai Namco Entertainment	Nintendo Switch, Microsoft Windows	Nintendo Switch and Windows port
2020	22/7 Ongaku no Jikan	Aniplex	iOS, Android	
2020	Family Trainer	Bandai Namco Entertainment	Nintendo Switch	
2021	Layton's Mystery Journey: Katrielle and The Millionaires' Conspiracy Deluxe Edition Plus	Level-5	Nintendo Switch	
2021	Neo: The World Ends with You	Square Enix	PlayStation 4, Nintendo Switch, Microsoft Windows	
2021	Megaton Musashi	Level-5	Nintendo Switch, PlayStation 4, PlayStation 5, Microsoft Windows	
2022	The Centennial Case: A Shijima Story	Square Enix	PlayStation 4, PlayStation 5, Nintendo Switch, Microsoft Windows	
2024	Shin chan: Shiro and the Coal Town	Neos	Nintendo Switch, Microsoft Windows	
2024	Puyo Puyo Puzzle Pop	Sega	iOS	
Cancelled	Chocobo Racing 3D	Square Enix	Nintendo 3DS	
2026	Digimon Story Time Stranger	Bandai Namco	Nintendo Switch, Nintendo Switch 2	Nintendo Switch and Nintendo Switch 2 port
