= Disney Magical World =

2013 video game

- North American cover art
- Developer: h.a.n.d.
- Publishers: JP: Bandai Namco Games (Note: Released under the Namco brand name); WW: Nintendo
- Directors: Kouji Yamamoto; Takahiro Okano
- Producers: Kentaro Hisai; Emiko Yamamoto; Adam Evanko; Tsuyoshi Kobayashi
- Composer: Keiki Kobayashi
- Platform: Nintendo 3DS
- Release: JP: August 1, 2013; NA: April 11, 2014; EU: October 24, 2014
- Genre: Life simulation
- Modes: Single-player, multiplayer

Disney Magical World (Note: Japanese: ディズニー マジックキャッスル マイ・ハッピー・ライフ, Hepburn: Dizunī Majikku Kyassuru: Mai Happī Raifu; lit. "Disney Magic Castle: My Happy Life") is a life simulation video game developed by h.a.n.d. and published by Bandai Namco Games for the Nintendo 3DS. The game was released in Japan on August 1, 2013, in North America by Nintendo on April 11, 2014, and in Europe on October 24, 2014.

A sequel, Disney Magical World 2, was released for the Nintendo 3DS in 2015 and Nintendo Switch in 2021.

== Gameplay ==
A player in the cafe

The game uses either a previously made Mii or newly made in-game character to complete quests in the town of Castleton. The game features various activities such as fishing, card collecting, gardening, making clothes and decorating the town's cafe, as well as making the food to be sold. When completing these activities, the player is awarded with stickers which act as a leveling up system, allowing the player to progress further in the game.

The game features 4 main plot lines: one in Cinderella's world, one in Wonderland, one in the Hundred Acre Wood and one in Agrabah. These can be done in any order and require the player to help the main characters of each world by battling ghosts in dungeons. The Cinderella world also allows players to attend balls by playing a rhythm game.

As well as this, numerous Disney characters and other non-playable characters will arrive in Castleton giving the player various quests which require the player to enter each of these worlds outside of the plot lines, and foraging for materials. As the player progresses through the story, more weapons and armor become available which must be made using the materials that the player finds in the various dungeons.

== Reception ==
Reception

Aggregate score
Aggregator	Score
Metacritic	71/100

Review scores
Publication	Score
Destructoid	7/10
Nintendo Life	8/10
Nintendo World Report	8.5/10
The Guardian	4/5

Disney Magical World has received mostly positive reviews, scoring 71/100 on Metacritic. Nintendo World Report awarded the game 8.5/10, praising the wide range of activities and gameplay but felt that the loading times interrupted the game's progress. Game Revolution gave it a 3 out of 5, saying while packed with characters and collectables, criticized the repetitive tasks and lack of a main attraction.

As of March 31, 2014, the game has shipped 500,000 copies.
