= List of DS:Style software =

Series of educational software

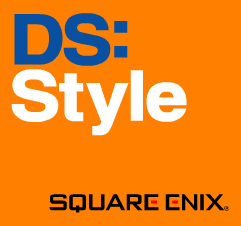
The logo of the series

DS:Style is a series of educational software products for the Nintendo DS console. The series was created and published in Japan exclusively by Square Enix, a Japanese video game developer and publisher, and developed by both Square Enix and several other companies. It includes reference guides, travel guides for different countries or cities, and study guides for Japanese professional licensing and civil servant exams. The motto for the series is "The fun of games, the joy of learning". Despite the motto and being sold for a game console, the products actually include almost no gaming elements, instead functioning as reference guides and knowledge quizzes. The series was perceived when it launched as an attempt by Square Enix to break into a new market, that of "non-traditional gamers". All the games that got a TV commercial were endorsed by Hitomi Kaikawa.

The first nine products in the series were announced on April 4, 2007, and the first five were released on July 5, 2007; the last DS:Style release was on February 3, 2011. Several of the products were named after other non-software products, such as the Lonely Planet series of travel guides, the Japanese Legal Mind (LEC) test preparatory company, or the Japanese Tipness yoga studio chain. While not a part of the DS:Style series, bookkeeping and real estate certification products (Honki de Manabu: LEC de Goukaku - DS Hishou Boki 3-Kyū and Honki de Manabu: LEC de Goukaku - DS Takuchi Tatemono Torihiki Shuninsha) were also released on the PlayStation Portable in 2010.

The releases, as they fell in the line between games and software products, went largely unreviewed. Prior to release, the initial products were regarded as having "potential". Critics' reactions to the series were tepid; they felt that the products would sell well, given the publisher and subject matter, but that there was little interesting about them. They felt that it would not be worth localizing the products to sell in non-Japanese markets, as there was not much of a market for non-game software for the Nintendo DS without heavy advertising, due to prior failures in promoting such products.

== List of products ==
List of products
Title	Topic	Developer	Release date	Ref(s)
Hanasaku DS Gardening Life (花咲くDSガーデニングLife, Gardening Life DS: Blooming Flowers)	Gardening	Elements	July 5, 2007	
Anata mo DS de Classic Kiite Mimasenka? (あなたも DSでクラシック 聴いてみませんか？, Classical DS: Won't You Listen?)	Classical music	iNiS	July 5, 2007	
Chikyū no Arukikata DS Tai (地球の歩き方DS タイ, Lonely Planet DS: Thailand)	Travel (Thailand)	Will	July 5, 2007	
Chikyū no Arukikata DS France (地球の歩き方DS フランス, Lonely Planet DS: France)	Travel (France)	Will	July 5, 2007	
Chikyū no Arukikata DS Italia (地球の歩き方DS イタリア, Lonely Planet DS: Italy)	Travel (Italy)	Will	July 5, 2007	
Anata dake no Private Lesson DS de Hajimeru Tipness no Yoga (あなただけのプライベートレッスン DSではじめる ティップネスのヨガ, Tipness Yoga DS: Private Lesson Only For You)	Yoga	Square Enix	October 4, 2007	
Chikyū no Arukikata DS Taiwan (地球の歩き方DS 台湾, Lonely Planet DS: Taiwan)	Travel (Taiwan)	Will	October 4, 2007	
Chikyū no Arukikata DS Hawaii (地球の歩き方DS ハワイ, Lonely Planet DS: Hawaii)	Travel (Hawaii)	Will	October 4, 2007	
Chikyū no Arukikata DS New York (地球の歩き方DS ニューヨーク, Lonely Planet DS: New York)	Travel (New York City)	Will	October 4, 2007	
Wine no Hajimekata DS (ワインのはじめかたDS, Wine DS: How to Start)	Wine	Square Enix	November 15, 2007	
Jinsei 87000 Kai no Shokuji o Tanoshiku suru Oishiku Kiwameru Shokutsû DS Otona no Shûmatsu Henshûbu Gensen no Osusume Omise Jôhô Hairi (人生8万7000回の食事を楽しくする おいしく極める食通DS おとなの週末編集部厳選のオススメお店情報入り, Gourmet DS: Editorial Selection of 87000 Deliciously Fun to Eat Once in a Lifetime Meals with Recommended Shop Information)	Cooking	h.a.n.d.	December 13, 2007	
Chikyū no Arukikata DS Igirisu (地球の歩き方DS イギリス, Lonely Planet DS: UK)	Travel (United Kingdom)	Will	December 13, 2007	
Chikyū no Arukikata DS Shanghai (地球の歩き方DS 上海, Lonely Planet DS: Shanghai)	Travel (Shanghai)	Will	December 13, 2007	
Chikyū no Arukikata DS Hong Kong (地球の歩き方DS 香港, Lonely Planet DS: Hong Kong)	Travel (Hong Kong)	Will	December 13, 2007	
Chikyū no Arukikata DS Seoul, Busan (地球の歩き方DS ソウル・釜山, Lonely Planet DS: Seoul, Busan)	Travel (Seoul, Busan)	Will	December 13, 2007	
Honki de Manabu: LEC de Goukaku - DS Hishou Boki 3-Kyū (本気で学ぶ LECで合格る DS日商簿記3級, I Really Learn - LEC Passing Guide: Level 3 Bookkeeping DS)	Certification (Bookkeeping)	Matrix Software	April 17, 2008	
Honki de Manabu: LEC de Goukaku - DS Hishou Kentei 2-Kyū/3-Kyū (本気で学ぶ LECで合格る DS秘書検定 2級／3級, I Really Learn - LEC Passing Guide: Level 2/3 Secretary Test DS)	Certification (Secretary)	Square Enix	February 26, 2009	
Honki de Manabu: LEC de Goukaku - DS Takuchi Tatemono Torihiki Shuninsha (本気で学ぶ LECで合格る DS宅地建物取引主任者, I Really Learn - LEC Passing Guide: Real Estate Transaction Specialist DS)	Certification (Real estate)	Square Enix	February 26, 2009	
Honki de Manabu: LEC de Goukakuru - DS Koumuinshiken Suumato Shori (本気で学ぶ LECで合格る DS公務員試験・数的処理, I Really Learn - LEC Passing Guide: Civil Service Test and Process DS)	Certification (Civil service examination)	Square Enix	December 3, 2009	
Honki de Manabu: LEC de Goukakuru - DS Kikenbutsu Toriatsukaimono Otsushu 4-Rui (本気で学ぶ LECで合格る DS危険物取扱者乙種4類, I Really Learn - LEC Passing Guide: Hazardous Materials Officer Class B Type 4 DS)	Certification (Hazardous materials)	Square Enix	December 3, 2009	
Honki de Manabu: LEC de Goukakuru - DS Gyouseishoshi (本気で学ぶ LECで合格る DS行政書士, I Really Learn - LEC Passing Guide: Administrative Writer DS)	Certification (Business writing)	Square Enix	September 2, 2010	
Honki de Manabu: LEC de Goukakuru - DS Takuchi Tatemono Torihiki Shuninsha 2011-Toshi & 2012-Toshi Nendoban (本気で学ぶ LECで合格る DS宅地建物取引主任者 2011年&2012年版, I Really Learn - LEC Passing Guide: Real Estate Transaction Specialist DS - 2011 and 2012 Edition)	Certification (Real estate)	Square Enix	February 3, 2011	
