= Tamagotchi: Party On! =

2006 party video game

- Cover art of Tamagotchi: Party On!
- Developer: h.a.n.d.
- Publisher: Namco Bandai Games
- Platform: Wii
- Release: JP: December 2, 2006; NA: May 29, 2007; EU: August 31, 2007; AU: September 13, 2007
- Genre: Party
- Modes: Single-player, multiplayer

Tamagotchi's Sparkling President, released outside Japan as Tamagotchi: Party On!, is a party video game developed by h.a.n.d. and published by Namco Bandai Games for the Wii. The game was originally released in 2006 in Japan as a launch title for the system; it is the only Tamagotchi Wii game released outside Japan, with Namco Bandai Games releasing it internationally in 2007.

== Gameplay ==
Like the other Tamagotchi games, Tamagotchi: Party On! is composed of mini-games in which players compete. The game's mini-games, like Driving and Watering plants, have rewards at the end depending on how well the mini-game was cleared. Players play as different Tamagotchi characters like Mimitchi, Violetchi, Kuchipatchi, etc. It also has games in which the player tries to get "Gotchi", Tamagotchi cash. Players use this cash to buy items to customize their headquarters. Players can play as the Tamagotchi characters, such as Mametchi and Kuchipatchi, with some characters unlocked while playing. There are always four players in the game. If there are fewer than four people playing, the CPU will play. The player can set the difficulty level to easy, medium, or hard. The game is a series of elections, set by the player, that determine who will be the next president of Tamaworld. Apart from this, the player can also play the minigames separately.

== Story ==
Tamagotchi Planet needs a new president, and the Tamagotchi are setting up an election to see who it will be. The planet is abuzz and some of the characters want to be president. The election managers hold a competition for whoever can do the most good deeds, become the most popular Tamagotchi on the planet and get the most votes. The Tamagotchis set off to become the most popular Tama on the planet and the title of president.
