= Cobalt Flux Pad =

Game controller

- Developer: Cobalt Flux
- Manufacturer: Cobalt Flux
- Type: Dance pad

The Cobalt Flux Pad is a polycarbonate plastic and metal dance pad that is used with console dance games such as Dance Dance Revolution. It is designed and manufactured by the Salt Lake City-based company Cobalt Flux. It was cited as a popular DDR controller and was also distributed to various institutions.

== Features ==
Fundamentally, the Cobalt Flux Pad is similar to most dance pad designs. Instead of the typical four arrow plus corners panel layout as is common in soft dance pads, there are nine usable foot panels (center, left, right, up, down, and corners).

Internally, the Cobalt Flux Pad is unique among typical hard/metal dance pad designs. Official Dance Dance Revolution arcade machine dance pads contain a hollow area beneath each panel with small sensor switches. The Cobalt Flux design contains no hollow areas. Sensor contact is achieved by the flexing of layers of lexan panels and metal plates on a solid wood base.

The Cobalt Flux Pad itself connects to a "control box", which contains the start and select buttons for the dance controller. The connection to the control box uses a 15-pin serial connector which hangs out of the top of the pad as a dongle. This control box also handles the wiring needed for different gaming console connectors, which lead off of the control box. The control box is removable.

Cobalt Flux have provided two modification kits for their dance platforms. One kit version adds raised black textured panels to the corner panels, and more closely mimics the feel of the arcade platforms.

In 2009 Cobalt Flux launched a system called Blufit which is an eight-mat wireless multiplayer system with their own proprietary dance software, Streetfeet. Eight of these would link together into a 64-player system. Other active or fitness games could be played on it using either the dance pad as a controller, or other input peripherals.

=== Compatibility ===
The pad is compatible with both DDR style games (using four arrows), and Pump It Up simulators (using five buttons). However, official Pump It Up compatibility requires a separate control box, and the corner square panels are smaller than their rectangular equivalents in Pump It Up.

The original control box shipped with Cobalt Flux pads was designed to work only with the PlayStation 2. Players who wanted to use the pad with an Xbox or PC by running this control box through converters for standard PS2 controllers experienced an unacceptable amount of latency during play. Cobalt Flux has since released a new control box with built-in connectivity for PS2, Xbox, and the PC.

There is also a special Pump It Up version of the control box that enables the center sensor and properly maps all buttons in order to play Pump It Up without issue. This version connects to PS2 only.

=== Additional versions ===
In 2005, Cobalt Flux began to offer more durable dance platform variations with extended warranties and additional features like monitor mounts. These were installed at schools, fitness centers, and other institutions, and had identifying decals and black trim to distinguish them from the residential pads.

These commercial versions are intended to be fixed in place and also have shock absorbing material included to lessen joint strain. The heaviest duty commercial mat is built to US military specification and has a four-year warranty. School platforms have handles as these tend to be set up and packed away.

== Reception ==
Wired magazine described the Cobalt Flux Pad as "pricey", criticizing it as sliding on uncarpeted surfaces, and making "quite the racket" when used. They also cited the necessity for Xbox players to use an adapter as a downside. However, they praised its sturdiness and the ability to link them together. PSM2 magazine also called it a "very expensive pad", as well as "solid" and "surprisingly cool-looking". They ultimately described it as "easily the highest-quality pad we tested" and "wonderfully responsive", noting that it came with non-skid sticky pads.

Edge magazine called the pads "excellent" and "a health club alternative to step aerobics", citing their use in a linked setup by Scandinavian company Positive Gaming at ATEI 2006. Skrolli magazine described the pad as one of the best on the market for home use, but also noted some downsides, such as the propensity for debris to get caught inside the mechanism and cause errors in step recognition.
