= Stadium Events =

1986 video game

- North American box art
- Developer: Human Entertainment
- Publishers: Bandai (Stadium Events); Nintendo (World Class Track Meet)
- Platform: Nintendo Entertainment System
- Release: JP: December 23, 1986; NA: September 1987; EU: February 23, 1990
- Genres: Exergaming, sports
- Modes: Single-player, multiplayer

Stadium Events (Note: Known in Japan as Family Trainer 2: Running Stadium (Japanese: ファミリートレーナー2 ランニングスタジアム, Hepburn: Famirī Torēnā 2 Ranningu Sutajiamu)) is a sports fitness game developed by Human Entertainment and published by Bandai for the Nintendo Entertainment System (NES). This and Athletic World are the two games in the Family Fun Fitness series, designed and branded for the short-lived Family Fun Fitness mat accessory for the NES. Stadium Events allows players to compete in four different Olympic inspired sporting events, using the mat to move as they compete in running and jumping focused gameplay.

The North American version was rebranded by Nintendo after its 1987 release. The game was re-released as World Class Track Meet and the new mat was titled the Power Pad. Original North American copies of Stadium Events are now considered to be among the rarest video games, leading to high prices in the secondary video game collecting market.

== Gameplay ==
A player competes against the computer in the 110M hurdles.

Stadium Events is a fitness game that allows the players to compete in four different sporting events: 100M dash, 110M hurdles, long jump, and triple jump. The game utilizes the Family Fun Fitness control mat which supports up to two players simultaneously, although up to six alternating players can be registered for each event. The left side of the mat must be used for the dash and hurdle events, while the other events can use either side. The top speed of the player's runner is dependent upon which row of buttons on the mat is used. If the player lifts their feet slightly before the starting signal, it is considered a false start.

The 100M dash event places two players against each other in a race. The 110M hurdles event is similar to the dash, but the players must jump when white box markers appear along the edge of the screen. The long jump has the players running and then jumping and staying in the air as long as possible to record a longer distance. The triple jump is similar to the long jump but includes three separate jump markers. In tournament mode, the player must compete against computer players at the 100M dash and 110M hurdle events. The player must beat each of the six computer players at both the dash and hurdle events in order to win. In this mode, three false starts results in a disqualification. In another mode, "The Olympics", numerous players can compete in all four events consecutively. In this mode, the Guinness 1982 world track record is used as a reference for scoring standards.

== Release ==
Stadium Events was released for the Nintendo Entertainment System in North America in September 1987. Nintendo saw promise in the Family Fun Fitness technology and purchased the mat, re-branding it as the Power Pad. Bandai's fitness mat and games were gone from retail stores by June 1988. Afterwards, Nintendo re-published Stadium Events, rebranding it as World Class Track Meet.

The North American version of Stadium Events is considered one of the rarest NES games. The total number of copies sold to consumers is unknown. The standard minimum initial run for an NES game was around 10,000 copies, but collectors believe the game's scarcity is much higher. A popular rumor that the game was sold at one Woolworth's store was proven false. Howard Phillips, a former spokesman for Nintendo of America, did not believe the cartridges were destroyed and claimed that reworking all of the cartridges would have been impractical. Stadium Events copies have been sold for up to US$35,100 in the video game collecting market.
