= Active Life: Outdoor Challenge =

2008 video game

- Original North American Wii box art
- Developer: h.a.n.d.
- Publisher: Namco Bandai Games
- Director: Yoshihiro Tamura
- Designers: Atsuko Higashiyama; Wataru Nakamura; Miku Kamikawa; Keiko Ueda; Nobuo Yamashita; Kazushi Kōsaka
- Composers: Kenjiro Hiwatari; Makoto Igarashi; Yuki Watanabe; Atsuko Kawanishi
- Platforms: Wii, Nintendo Switch
- Release: Wii: JP: May 29, 2008; EU: August 9, 2008; NA: September 9, 2008; Nintendo Switch: JP: December 17, 2020; NA: September 3, 2021; EU: September 3, 2021; AU: September 10, 2021
- Modes: Single player, multiplayer

Active Life: Outdoor Challenge (Family Trainer: Athletic World in Japan and Family Trainer in Europe) is a 2008 video game for the Wii produced by Namco Bandai Games. Players use a mat similar to the Power Pad in conjunction with the Wii Remote in order to complete a variety of mini-games. The game is comparable to Wii Fit. As of January 30, 2009, the game has sold one million copies worldwide. A sequel, titled Active Life: Extreme Challenge, was released on August 11, 2009.

An enhanced port of the game was released for the Nintendo Switch in December 2020 in Japan, and in September 2021 in North America, Europe, and Oceania. Physical copies of the Nintendo Switch port are bundled with two leg-strap accessories, which are required for co-op gameplay.

The Japanese release has the same title as the first game for the Nintendo Entertainment System (the Nintendo Family Computer in Japan) to be released for the Power Pad accessory.

== Gameplay ==
Active Life: Outdoor Challenge is a fitness game controlled by a mat on the floor that responds to hand or feet movement on specific areas on the mat. The game has multiple control styles, which vary depending on the game. The mat used to control the game has a total of 10 buttons, each with different purposes. In the middle of the mat, there are 2 square buttons, one orange and one blue. These buttons are used in most games for basic movement such as jumping or running. There are 6 arrows surrounding every side of the mat, 3 orange and 3 blue. These buttons are mostly used for directional movement in single player, and for running in the two player games. The mat also features a plus and minus button on either side of the mat. The buttons essentially act as a way to help navigate menus without having to pick up the controller, as well as to pause the game. As the Mat Controller connects to the console directly through GameCube controller ports, the controller and game are incompatible with subsequent Wii models that do not have them. The Nintendo Switch port replaces the Mat Controller with leg straps that the player wears, each containing a separated unique Joy-Con to control movement, and its reliance on separated Joy-Con renders the game incompatible with the one-piece Nintendo Switch Lite.

The game features many minigames and three main modes, and can be played alone or head-to-head with a second player.

== Reception ==
Reception

Aggregate score
Aggregator	Score
Metacritic	69/100

Review scores
Publication	Score
GameZone	5/10
Nintendo World Report	7/10

The game received mixed reviews from critics, receiving a 69 out of 100 from Metacritic. Louis Bedigian on Gamezone gave it a 5 out of 10, stating that "while the game is successful in some areas and downright creative in others, Active Life: Outdoor Challenge is not be the most entertaining or most beneficial way to get in shape." Nintendo World Report reviewed the game, saying that the game "is a very promising start to a series and a great complement to Wii Fit."

== See also ==
- Active Life: Extreme Challenge
- Active Life: Explorer
