= Disney Magical World 2 =

2015 video game

- North American cover art
- Developers: h.a.n.d.; Bandai Namco Studios
- Publisher: Bandai Namco Entertainment: WW: Nintendo (3DS)
- Platforms: Nintendo 3DS; Nintendo Switch
- Release: Nintendo 3DS: JP: November 5, 2015; NA/EU: October 14, 2016; AU: October 15, 2016; Nintendo Switch: WW: December 3, 2021
- Genre: Life simulation
- Mode: Single-player

Disney Magical World 2 (Note: Japanese: ディズニー マジックキャッスル マイ・ハッピー・ライフ 2, Hepburn: Dizunī Majikku Kyassuru: Mai Happī Raifu 2; lit. Disney Magic Castle: My Happy Life 2) is a life simulation video game developed by h.a.n.d. and published by Bandai Namco Entertainment for the Nintendo 3DS. It is the sequel to Disney Magical World. The game was released on November 5, 2015 in Japan and in October 2016 in North America, Europe, and Australia by Nintendo. Compared to its predecessor, the game added new features, costumes, worlds, and more characters. The theme song for the game is "Sparkle ~Kagayaki wo Shinjite~" by May J.

A remastered version for the Nintendo Switch console, titled Disney Magical World 2: Enchanted Edition, was released on December 3, 2021.

== Gameplay ==
A Mii character in the game's main hub world, Castleton (upper screenshot from the original 3DS version, lower screenshot from the Switch's Enchanted Edition)

Disney Magical World 2 is a life simulation game. Features from its predecessor include building furniture, clothing and using ingredients, as well as new features such as riding a boat. The game adds new characters from Mickey Mouse and Friends, The Three Little Pigs, Snow White and the Seven Dwarfs, Pinocchio, Fantasia, The Three Caballeros, Cinderella, Alice in Wonderland, Peter Pan, Sleeping Beauty, The Aristocats, Winnie the Pooh, The Little Mermaid, Beauty and the Beast, Aladdin, The Nightmare Before Christmas, Hercules, Lilo & Stitch, Pirates of the Caribbean, Tangled, Wreck-It Ralph and Frozen.

== Development ==
Bandai Namco Entertainment officially announced the title in June 2015 by opening an official website. A live stream was hosted on July 6 with additional information being revealed. The game shipped in Japan on November 5. A new 3DS bundle was also revealed, containing the game itself and a specially designed 3DS featuring Mickey Mouse.

== Reception ==
Reception

Aggregate score
Aggregator	Score
Metacritic	(3DS) 73/100 (NS) 69/100

Review scores
Publication	Score
Destructoid	7.5/10
Nintendo Life	(3DS) 8/10 (NS) 7/10
Nintendo World Report	7.5/10

=== Sales ===
In 2015, Disney Magical World 2 was the 5th best selling title in Japan in early November. In 2016, it was the 19th best selling game in early February in Japan.

Disney Magical World 2: Enchanted Edition was the 8th best selling title in Japan between November 29 and December 5. It was the 24th best selling game in the country between 20–26 December. In 2021, it was one of the top 100 best selling games in Japan, being 92nd. In 2022, between 17–23 January, it was the 29th best selling game in Japan.
