= Active Life: Explorer =

2010 video game

- Box art for Active Life: Explorer, with an Active Life Mat bundled with the game
- Developer: h.a.n.d.
- Publisher: Namco Bandai Games
- Directors: Kazuhiro Sogawa; Kaname Fujii
- Producer: Maya Ito
- Composers: Kenjiro Hiwatari; Yuki Watanabe; Yuzo Takahashi
- Series: Active Life
- Platform: Wii
- Release: NA: October 19, 2010; JP: October 21, 2010; EU: October 22, 2010
- Genre: Exergaming
- Modes: Single-player; Multiplayer

Active Life: Explorer, known in Japan and Europe as Family Trainer: Treasure Adventure (ファミリートレーナー：トレジャーアドベンチャー Famirītorēnā: Torejāadobenchā), is a fitness game produced by Maya Ito. First announced at E3 2010, it was released by Namco Bandai for the Wii that same year.

Explorer is the sequel to the 2009 video game Active Life: Extreme Challenge. It consists of a total of 24 mini-games, which can be played freely in the Free Play mode. It can be played as a party game as well. It has received mixed to positive reviews, receiving a 64.33% on GameRankings.

As this game's unique pad controller is designed to physically connect to the Wii via its GameCube controller ports, this game is incompatible with later Wii models, which eliminated the said ports.

== Gameplay ==
Active Life: Explorer is a sports game, but it also mixes into a party game as well. It consists of a total of 24 mini-games having their own theme – Jungle, Western, Underwater, Snowy, and more. In each of the modes, players choose a character or make a new one if there are free character slots. Players also have the ability to use their Mii characters as well.

In Treasure Adventure, players must find as much treasure as possible while working on the top score for each quest. The game also includes a party mode, which can be played with up to 8 people. Party mode games can either be played in 5, 10 or 20 rounds. The player with most points after the final round is the winner. The top 5 scores for each game are shown in the Rankings menu. In Free Play mode, players can play any of the 24 mini-games. In Party Mode as many as eight players compete against each other in a randomly selected mini-game. In Treasure Trials a player goes through a series of tests to earn a rank. They are Rookie, Amateur, Specialist, Professional, Veteran, Master, and Legend, from lowest to highest.

After a player beats all the Treasure Trials, the Challenge Missions are unlocked. Here, each mini-game offers two challenges where a skill is practiced.

== Reception ==
The game received mixed to positive reviews from critics, receiving a 64.33% from GameRankings. Pedro Hernandez on Nintendo World Report gave it an 8.5 out of 10, stating it as an "excellent mini-game compilation title as well as a fitness game."
