= Bandai =

Japanese toy company

Bandai Co., Ltd.
- Logo used since 1983

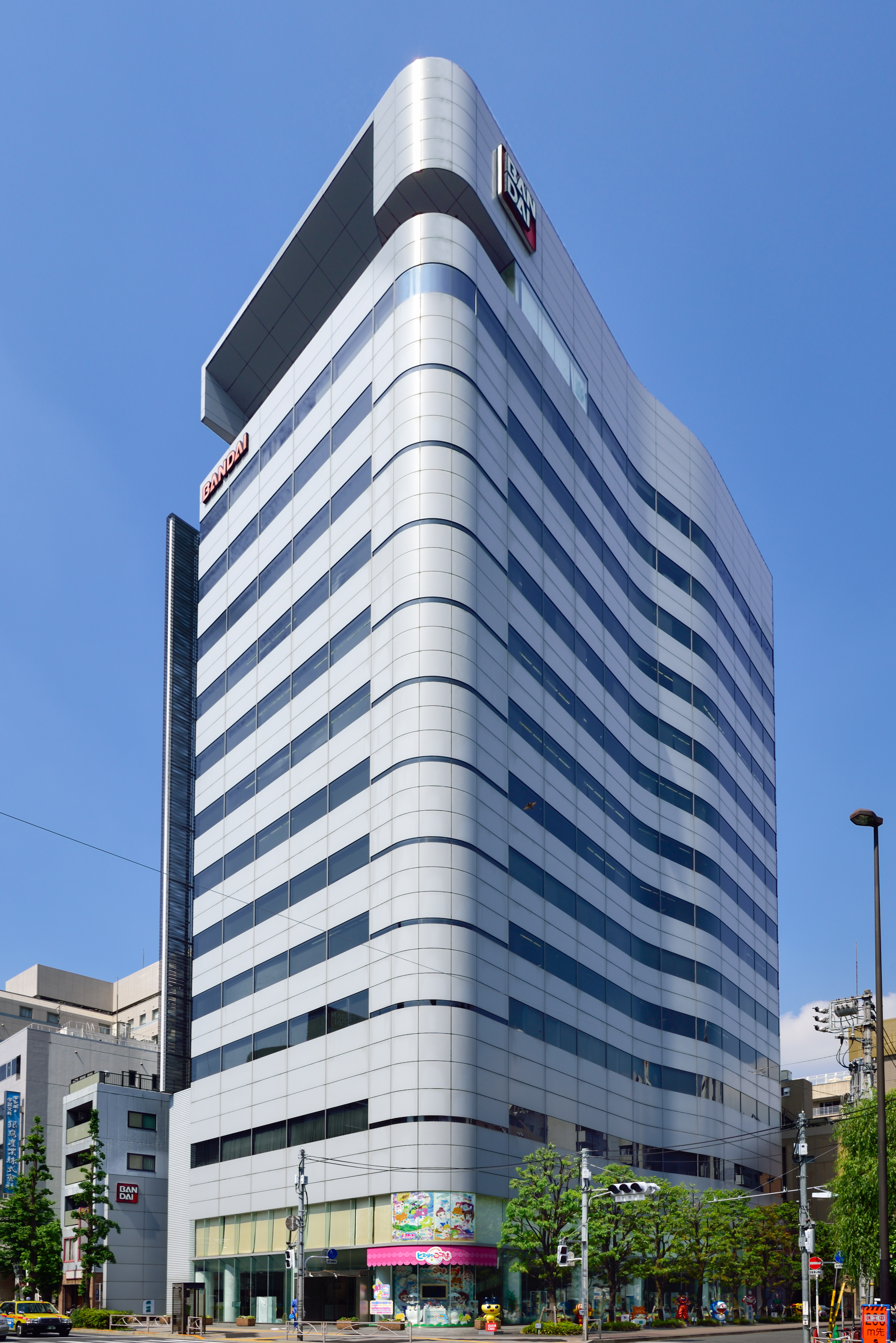
- Bandai's corporate headquarters in Taitō, Tokyo
- Native name: 株式会社バンダイ
- Romanized name: Kabushiki-gaisha Bandai
- Formerly: Bandai-ya (1950–1960)
- Type: Subsidiary
- Industry: Toys
- Founded: July 5, 1950; 76 years ago
- Founder: Naoharu Yamashina
- Headquarters: Komagata, Taitō, Tokyo, Japan
- Key people: Kazuhiro Takenaka (president)
- Products: Action figures; Virtual pets; Trading cards
- Brands: Bandai Shokugan; Bandai Candy; Bandai Card Games; Digimon; Harumika; Cocotama; Tamagotchi
- Operating income: ▲¥21.7 billion (2019)
- Net income: ▲¥242.8 billion (2019)
- Number of employees: 851 (January 2021)
- Parent: Bandai Namco Holdings (2005–present)
- Subsidiaries: Bandai Spirits; Heart; MegaHouse; Plex; Bandai Namco Craft; Sun-Star Stationary (51%); Bandai Namco Toys & Collectibles America; Corporación Bandai México; Bandai Namco Toys & Hobby UK; Bandai France; Bandai España; Bandai Namco Asia; Bandai Namco Korea
- Website: bandai.co.jp/products/ bandai.co.jp
- Footnotes "Bandai Namco Group Integrated Report 2019". Bandai Namco Holdings. September 13, 2019. Archived from the original on May 17, 2020. "About Company". Bandai. Archived from the original on January 30, 2019.

Bandai Co., Ltd. (Note: Japanese: 株式会社バンダイ, Hepburn: Kabushiki gaisha Bandai; Stylized in all caps) is a Japanese multinational toy manufacturer and distributor headquartered in Taitō, Tokyo, including many international branches around the world. Since 2005, Bandai has been the toy production division of Bandai Namco Holdings, which, in 2017, was the world's second largest toy company measured by total revenue. Between 1981 and 2001, Bandai was a manufacturer of video game consoles. Bandai was founded by World War II veteran Naoharu Yamashina as Bandai-Ya on July 5, 1950, as the corporate spin-off of a textile wholesaler. The company began as a distributor of metallic toys and rubber swimming rings, before moving to metal cars and aircraft models. It was renamed Bandai Co., Ltd. in 1961 and achieved considerable success with its action figures based on the anime Astro Boy.

== History ==
=== Origins and success with toys (1947–1968) ===
In 1947, Naoharu Yamashina began working for a Kanazawa-based textile wholesaler. The eldest son to a rice retailer, Yamashina had studied business in high school and was enlisted in World War II, where an impact from a grenade shrapnel blinded him in his right eye. The textile business, ran by his wife's brother, was struggling financially as a result of Japan's post-war economy. He made little money working, and as he was having a difficult time finding ways to allow the business to pick up, a neighbor told him about the potential of the toy industry and the financial success that could be generated from it. Intrigued, Yamashina convinced his wife to travel to Tokyo with him to begin studying the potentially lucrative market for toys. With little money or exposure in the field, the two worked long hours to establish a small toy distribution division within the textile business.

Yamashina assumed full control of the toy division on July 5, 1950, when it was spun-off as a separate company named Bandai-ya (Note: Japanese: 株式会社万代屋商店, Hepburn: Kabushiki gaisha Bandai-ya Shōten) in Taitō, Tokyo. The name was derived from Japanese reading of Chinese phrase "bandai fueki" (万代不易), meaning "eternally unchanging" or "things that are eternal" which originated from the Chinese military text Six Secret Teachings in one of the seven military texts of the Seven Military Classics. Being assisted by Atsuko Tatsumi, publisher of the Weekly Toy News in Tokyo, Bandai-ya distributed and imported celluloid dolls, metallic toys, and rubber swimming rings. The company released its first original product the same year, the Rhythm Ball, a beach ball with a bell inside that suffered from numerous quality defects. Bandai-ya improved the quality of its products as it continued designing new kinds of toys, such as inexpensive metal cars and aircraft models. Several of these were exported to the United States and elsewhere as a result of their popularity, being among the earliest "Made In Japan" products exported outside the country.

Bandai logo from 1965 to 1975

As its revenue increased, Bandai-ya began expanding its operations. A new shipping and warehouse facility was constructed in spring 1953, followed by research and development (R&D) and product inspection departments later that year. A manufacturing facility, Waraku Works, was opened in early 1955 to increase the production of toys. In the same year, it implemented the toy industry's first quality assurance system; the first toy approved by this was the 1956 Toyopet Crown model car, which was also Bandai-ya's first product with a guarantee. The growing company worked on creating a friendly corporate image for itself, introducing a new logo, slogan, and television commercials that emphasized its quality products. Bandai-ya was renamed Bandai in July 1961, the same time it started spreading its operations overseas, beginning with the establishment of Bandai Overseas Supply in New York City.

While its toys often sold well in Japan, Bandai didn't achieve considerable success until 1963, when it began producing action figures based on the anime Astro Boy. The toy line's success prompted Bandai to reorganize and rethink its business strategies, as the company transitioned from working on original products to funding the creation of new television series and acting as a sponsor during their run, with advertisements that showed off Bandai's tie-in action figures and costumes. A similar blockbuster hit was found with action figures in the likenesses of Ultraman characters, largely due to the popularity of the television series at the time; the figures were later released in North America to little fanfare. In July 1966, it released Crazy Foam, a line of bubble blowing canisters that sold 2.4 million units in three months, thanks to the backing of an extensive marketing campaign. Bandai's other products included the Thunderbird electrical vehicles, the Water Motor bath toys, and the Naughty Flipper, the last of which received a gold medal at the 1968 New York International Innovative productions Exhibition. An additional manufacturing plant was acquired in late 1969 to further increase the production of toys.

=== Continuing expansion and Mobile Suit Gundam (1971–1983) ===
Bandai logo from 1975 to 1983

Bandai continued its expansion throughout the 1970s. The company established a joint venture with model car manufacturer Tonka in 1970 and established Tonka Japan K.K., as part of Bandai's continuing mission in establishing ties with foreign companies. A subsidiary named Popy was formed a year later that specialized in the manufacturing of toys based on popular children's characters, the subsidiary was originally intended for candy shops and other retail outlets outside of the usual toy stores. Though Bandai became a major player in the Japanese toy industry, competing with companies such as Takara and Epoch, executives believed the company needed to further spread out into international territories to help increase worldwide brand awareness. Bandai Models was later established in 1971, who specialized in the manufacturing of toy characters. Although not its most profitable range, Bandai's 1/48 scale AFV models dominated that segment of the model kit market. Bandai America Inc. was established as local US sales/marketing operation in 1978. Spacewarp, a line of build-it-yourself toy rolling ball "roller coasters" was introduced by Bandai in the 1980s.

In May 1980, Makoto Yamashina, son of the founder, became president of Bandai. Naoharu Yamashina became chairman of the board. Upon his arrival, Makoto Yamashina completely changed the ageing staff of Bandai and replaced them with younger employees with the intent of not only bringing new ideas, but also revisiting the strategy of the group. The new president took a different commercial approach by selling directly to retailers rather than going through intermediates.

In July 1980, Bandai launched the 'Gundam Plastic Model' based on the animated series Mobile Suit Gundam which gave birth to the Gunpla range of scale model kits. In November, the subsidiary Celent was created.

=== Entry into the video game market (1983–1989) ===
Bandai videogame platforms

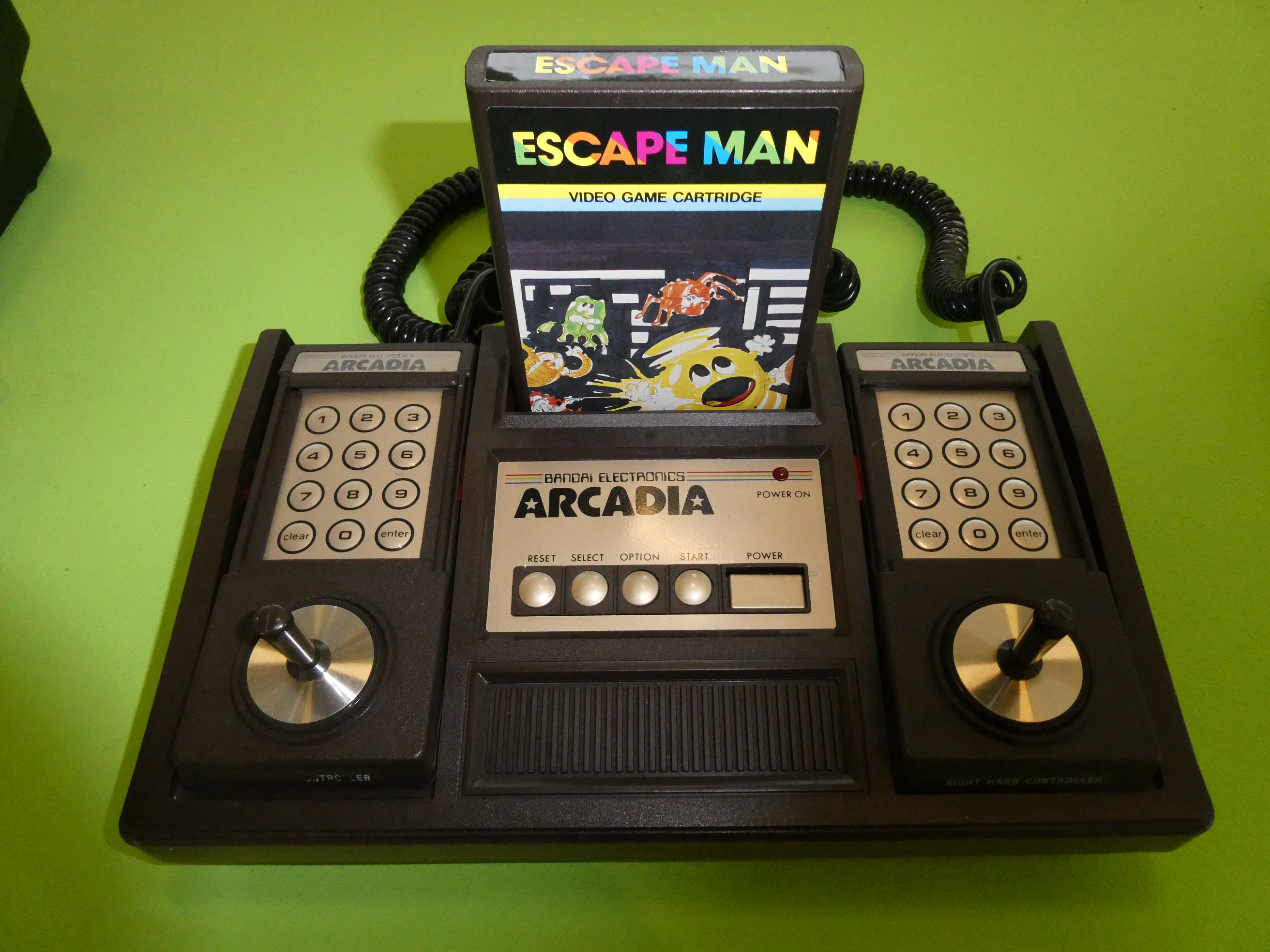
Arcadia

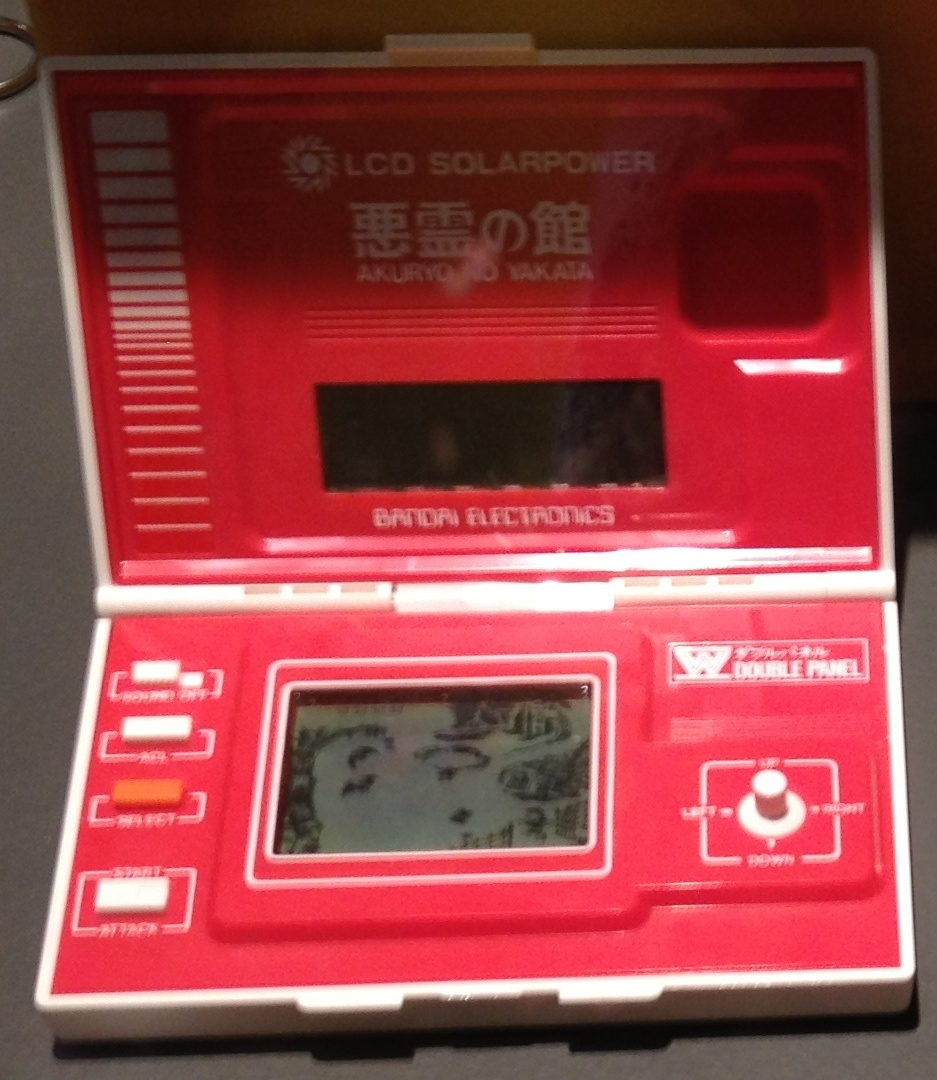
LCD Solarpower

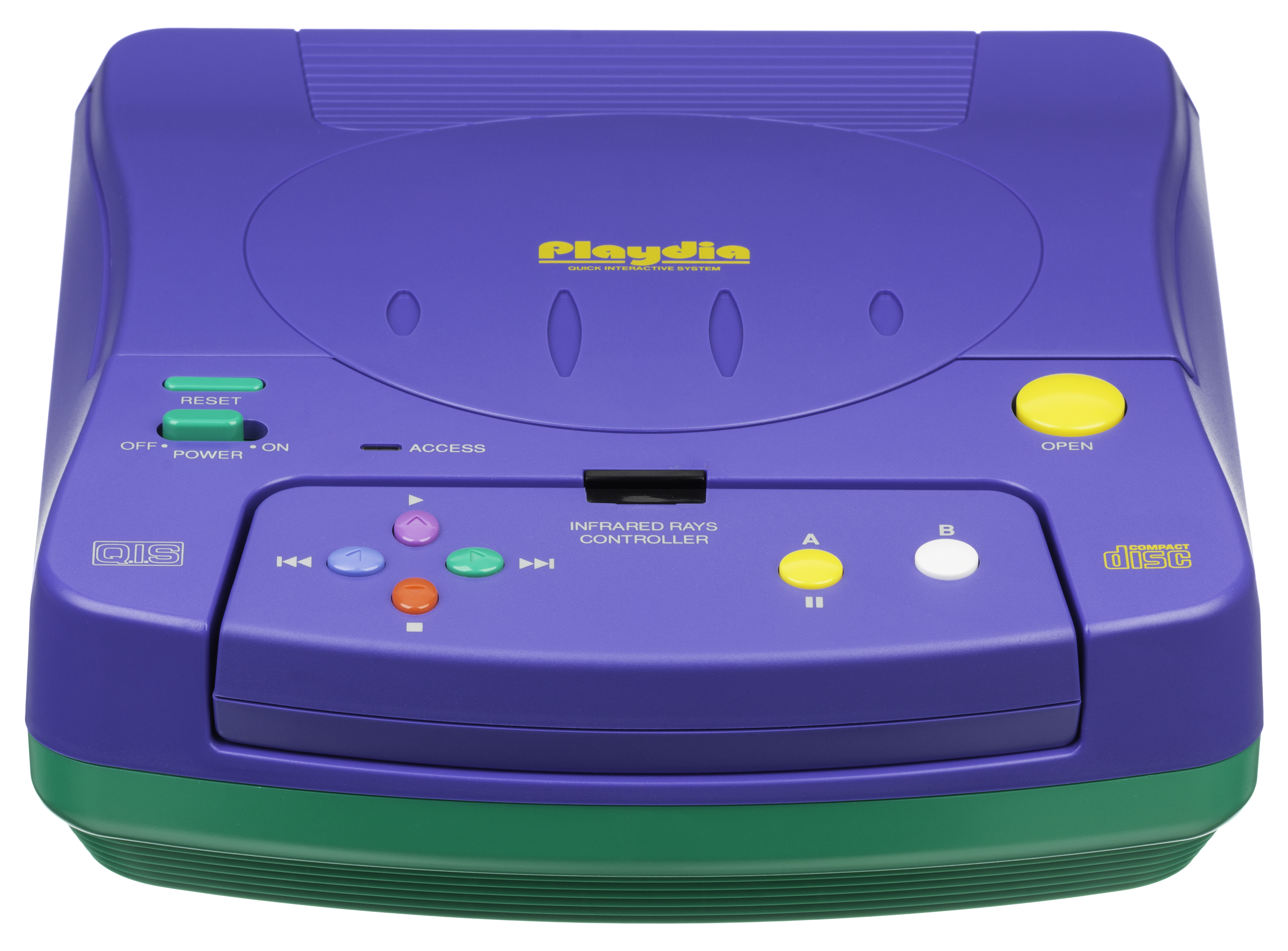
Playdia

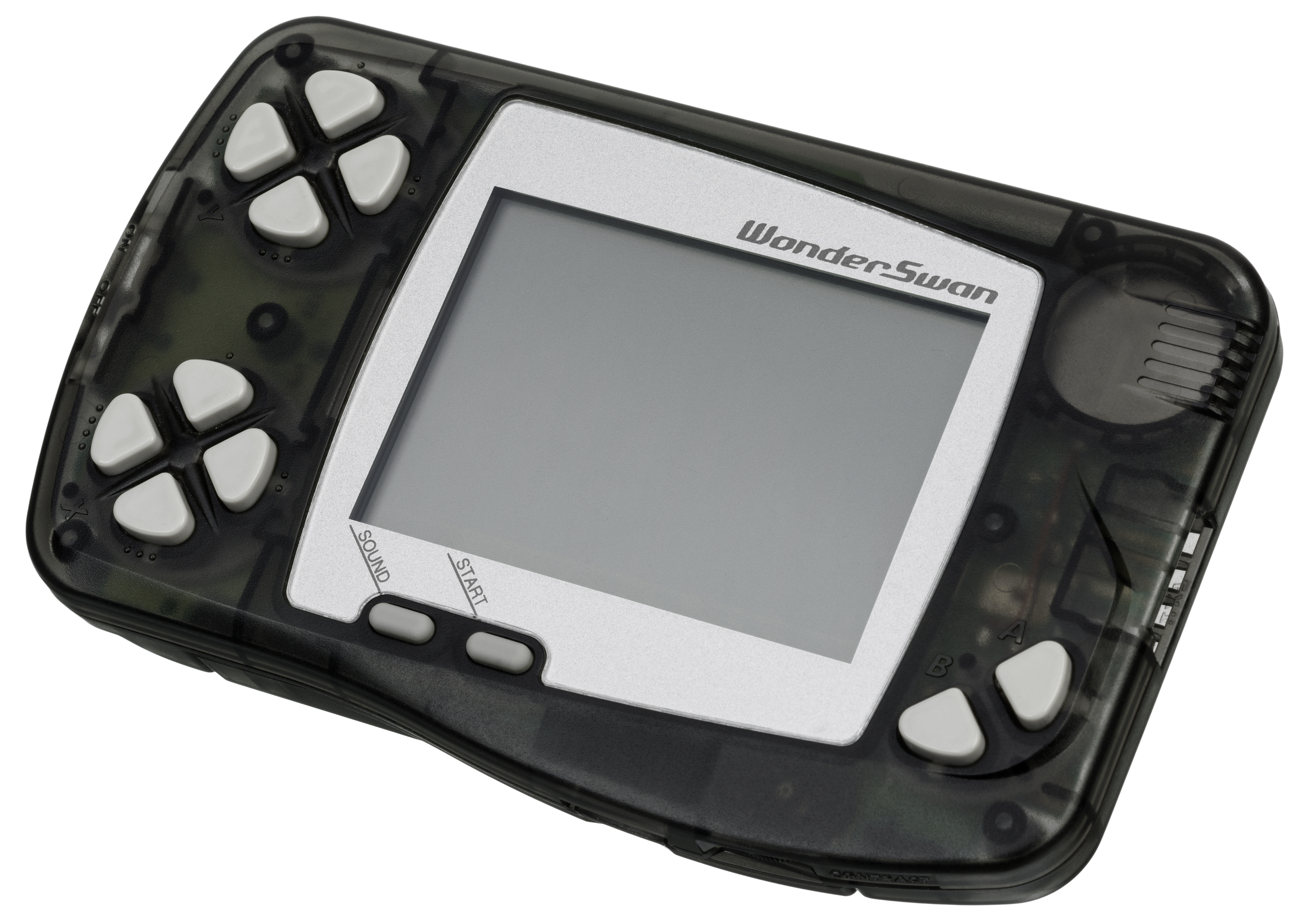
WonderSwan

Bandai became one of the first third-party developers for the Nintendo Family Computer in 1985. Among its first titles was Tag Team Match: MUSCLE, a video game adaptation of the Kinnikuman manga, which sold over one million copies. Bandai also produced the Family Trainer Pad, released outside Japan as the Power Pad, which also performed well commercially. A series of games was released both in the US and in Japan, including Athletic World and Stadium Events for the NES. Shortly after its release, Nintendo purchased the rights to the FFF mat in North America, replacing it with their own redesign, the Power Pad. In order to maintain branding continuity, Stadium Events was pulled from shelves after a short period of availability at Woolworth's stores. Because the game was pulled from shelves and discontinued before many copies were sold, Bandai's Stadium Events is universally accepted as the rarest licensed NES game released in North America. A shrink-wrapped copy of the game sold for $41,270 on eBay in February 2010. The sister game to Stadium Events, called Athletic World was initially released with a label that indicated compatibility with the Family Fun Fitness mat, but was later re-released with an updated label that mentions the Power Pad instead. Stadium Events was not released by name again, but instead was slightly modified and relaunched as the Power Pad pack-in game, World Class Track Meet.

Since the 1980s, Bandai has become the leading toy company of Japan, and to this day, has the main toy licenses in Japan to popular properties including Daikaiju, Ultraman, Super Robot, Kamen Rider, the Super Sentai and Power Rangers series (which it took part in creating), Gundam, and many others. In February 1989, it acquired arcade game developer Coreland and reorganized it into Banpresto, which became Bandai's coin-operated entertainment division. In the early 1990s, Bandai published games for Nintendo in the United Kingdom, including Street Fighter II on the Super Nintendo Entertainment System.

=== Mainstream success and expansion (1989–1995) ===
By 1989, Bandai celebrated its 39th anniversary as Makoto Yamashina spoke of the name "Bandai Land" as a vision for a leisure facility modeled after Disney's theme parks when Bandai decided to shift its focus from being a toy company to an entertainment company like the above as the name "Japan's Disney". In that same year when Bandai suffered numeruous financial troubles, it established a partnership with video game publisher & developer Corland in order for Bandai to expand into the coin-op industry as the former would allow themselves to launch a stronghold into the above genre. Later in that same year when Conland suffered similar financial constraints as it was having accumulated more than ¥1.5 billion in debt due to poor sales, Bandai rather than dropping out of the struggling Conland deal, it decided to majority-acquire the company in February 1989 and had it reorganised as its own video game publishing & development division Banpresto; the name came from a portmanteau of "Bandai" and "presto", a word used to describe magic, with Yukumasa Sugiara a member of Bandai's board of directors became president of the rebranded division.

In February 1994, Bandai entered the film & television animation production business by acquiring famous anime studio Sunrise, the acquisition of Sunrise had given Bandai their own official in-house anime production studio as Bandai's management including Satoru Matsumoto joining the acquired studio.

=== Financial decline, Tamagotchi, and failed merger with Sega (1995–1999) ===
In 1993, Bandai entered the home video game console market by launching its own video game console called Playdia which was released exclusively in Japan. However, in that year, Bandai planned to produce a second owned scaled-down version of the Macintosh purely for CD-ROM game-playing, Bandai's former president & CEO Makoto Yamashina chose the Macintosh platform over other platforms over that time. Around that year, Bandai exited the publishing business and dissolved its publishing division with them selling the remaining of its publishing operations MediaWorks, whilst Bandai retained B-Club and continued to publish the magazine.

In early 1994, Bandai approached American technology company Apple with an idea of producing a gaming console; later to be called the Apple Pippin (known as Pippin@mark in Japan) partnership with Apple. Bandai originally never intended to develop a system with Internet connection, however after receiving customer feedback, Bandai and Apple established a modem into the Pippin design. Once Bandai licensed the Pippin from Apple in December 1994, the former spent US$93 million in marketing alone to sell the Pippin line. One year later in June 1995 during the 1995 Tokyo Toy Show, Bandai established its unit Bandai Digital Software to promote early Pippin development; four months later in October of that year, Bandai launched its software publishing division Bandai Digital Entertainment Corporation in order to support the platform and developers in the United States. Bandai Digital Entertainment Co., Ltd. was formed on January 9, 1996 (two months before the launch of the Apple Pippin) to support the platform in Japan.

The Apple Pippin console was released two years later in March 1996, but it along with the Playdia were both unsuccessful for Bandai and lead them into discontinuing the console in that year, most of the unsold consoles were converted into coin-operated Micha King machines by its subsidiary Banpresto.

In January 1997, Bandai announced it would merge its operations with Japanese video game developer Sega. The merger, a $1 billion stock swap where Sega would acquire Bandai and dissolve the company, would have established a new entertainment conglomerate named Sega Bandai Ltd. with an estimated $6 billion in revenue. The announcement followed a ¥9 billion loss from Bandai the same month, attributed to declining game sales and the poor reception of the Apple Pippin console. Bandai felt Sega was an appropriate company to merge with, as it possessed an American management model and several international offices, in addition to owning several successful franchises like Sonic the Hedgehog. Opposition arose within Bandai's employees and midlevel executives, as neither felt the company's family-friendly work ethic meshed well with Sega's top-down corporate culture. However, the major success of Bandai's Tamagotchi toy line, which also launched the previous year, and strong opposition from within Bandai caused the plan to fall through. However, the two companies were not the "decisive factors" in the deal's collapse and as a result, Bandai called off the merge in May before its finalization in October. President Makoto Yamashina took responsibility for its failure, publicly apologizing and resigning his position within the company. Even after when Bandai called off the merger talks between Bandai and Sega, the former instead agreed to a business alliance with Bandai prioritising software development for Sega's game consoles.

One year later on February 27, 1998, after the merger between Bandai and Sega had fallen, Bandai sold all of the remaining inventory of hardware to American manufacturing company DayStar Digital with Bandai continued to support its own consoles until the end of 2002. Later in that year, Bandai's American distribution division Bandai America launched its anime entertainment distribution arm called Bandai Entertainment in order to license and distribute anime in North America and originally released its titles on VHS under the AnimeVillage label before releasing it under its own name.

In 2002, Bandai released the pre-painted kit of a railway car shorty model with a shortened length called the "B-Train Shorty". Similar products similar to the "B-Train Shorty" were released around the same time as the "B-Train Shorty" such as the "Star Train" a candy toy that realistically models the lead car at the same scale as N gauge, and the "ZZ Train" a battery-powered scale model with a rail width smaller than Z gauge.

In the beginning of March 2003, Bandai announced the merger its subsidiary Yutaka with its garage kit division B-Club to form a new subsidiary named Popy, reviving the Popy brand after its folding with Bandai back in the 1980s. However four years later in 2007, when Bandai's new parent Bandai Namco Holdings announced its restructuring, Popy was folded back into its parent Bandai into its subsidiary Plex whilst retaining the Popy brand.

Later in that same month of that year, Bandai achieved record-high operating and ordinary profits with the launching of the "Real Dream Doraemon Project" to create a real Doraemon. Meanwhile, Bandai launched its upgraded version of its handheld game console WonderSwan called the "WonderSwan Color" was released in 2000 as the successor to the first WonderSwan handheld console enjoyed moderate popularity following the release of the "Final Fantasy" series for the first time on a handheld game console. However, a lack of popular software and the onslaught of Nintendo's handheld competitor "Game Boy Advance" led to a gradual decline and in that same year, Bandai announced its de facto withdrawal from handheld game hardware development.

In April 2004, the company decided moved its headquarters to its current location. The new building has four elevators, each uniquely equipped with the voice of characters from its franchises and licensed properties such as Mametchi from the Tamagotchi franchise, Kamen Rider No. 1 from the Kamen Rider franchise, Anpanman from the picture book series of the same name and Amuro Ray from its anime subsidiary Sunrise Gundam franchise making announcements.

=== Bandai Namco era and restructuring (2005–present) ===
In September 2005 eight years after the proposed merger of Bandai and Sega had failed, Bandai announced that it had merged with multinational video game developer, amusement facility & entertainment company Namco (with whom Bandai had previously had a partnership) into establishing a new holding parent company that would bring all of Bandai's toy manufacturing and anime entertainment production activities and Namco's video game publishing & developing operations under one group called Bandai Namco Holdings which was called "Namco Bandai" outside of Japan, becoming the largest toy and videogame business.

After its merger with game developer and amusement facility operator Namco in 2005, Bandai is now under the management and a member of Namco Bandai Holdings. One year later on January 4, 2006, Bandai's American video game publishing division Bandai Games had merged with Namco's American developing division Namco Hometek to form Namco Bandai Games America Inc., which was housed within Bandai Games' former premises. A week later on the 11th of that month in that year, Bandai's console division had been merged with Namco's console game, business program, mobile phone, and research facility divisions to form Namco Bandai Games Inc. in March 2006. Both Bandai and Namco continued working independently under the newly formed Namco Bandai Holdings until 31 March 2006, when its video game operations were merged to form Namco Bandai Games. On October 30, Bandai's European video game division merged with Namco's European game division as well, forming Namco Bandai Games Europe S.A.S.

At the beginning of March 2006, Bandai's hobby building Bandai Hobby Center had been moved from its former factory in Shizuoka Works at Shimizu Ward, Shizuoka, where the plastic model production had been conducted since the former Imai era, to a new factory based in Aoi Ward, Shizuoka City and started its operations. The new facility handles all Gunpla-related areas, including development, design, mold making, and production, except for sales and promotion. By consolidating all aspects of development and production within the same facility, Bandai aims to improve production efficiency and quality.

On April 1, 2009, the Bandai Games label website operated by the company was integrated into the official website of Namco Bandai Games. At the same time, Namco Bandai Games had also taken over the intellectual property rights for game titles released which the games division of Bandai had been previously managed before the integration. Furthermore, Bandai transferred its commercials for its game titles produced under the Bandai Games label into Namco Bandai Games' own commercial activities alongside its game business which had been completely integrated into Namco Bandai Games. A few weeks later on April 20 of that year, Bandai launched its official shopping website, called "Premium Bandai" was launched. The site offers a wide variety of products, focusing on items that are difficult to sell through general distribution channels and adult apparel.

Following a group reorganization in 2006, Bandai heads the group's Toys and Hobby strategic business unit (SBU). Bandai Entertainment announced it would cease its distribution operations in January 2012. Beez Entertainment is no longer releasing new anime in Europe.

In April 2014, Bandai Namco Games announced the discontinuation of the Bandai brand from its video games as part of a major reorganization.

In February 2018, Saban Brands and Bandai's US division jointly announced a mutual agreement to not renew its Power Rangers master toy license, effective Spring 2019, after which competing toy company Hasbro will inherit the license. This transition will not affect Bandai Japan's Super Sentai (the series from which Power Rangers takes footage) master toy license with Toei.

A sister company, Bandai Spirits, was established on 15 February 2018. On 1 April 2018, the division of Bandai that dealt with products for adult customers (including figures and plastic models) as well as Banpresto's prizes business were transferred over to Bandai Spirits.

On September 18, 2025, Bandai and Bandai Spirits jointly warned that their brand names and logos were used for AI-generated images for figures and other items on social media without permission and has received inquiries about this situation.

== Product lines ==
=== Trading card games ===
Bandai publishes several trading card games based on established anime, manga and entertainment franchises under its Bandai Card Games brand, established in September 2023. Its portfolio includes:

- Dragon Ball Super Card Game (2017)
  - Dragon Ball Super Card Game Masters
  - Dragon Ball Super Card Game Fusion World (2024)
- Digimon Card Game (2020)
- One Piece Card Game (2022)
- Union Arena (2023)
- Gundam Card Game (2025)
- Naruto Card Game (2027)

=== Scale models ===
(incomplete list)

Scale model trains by Bandai
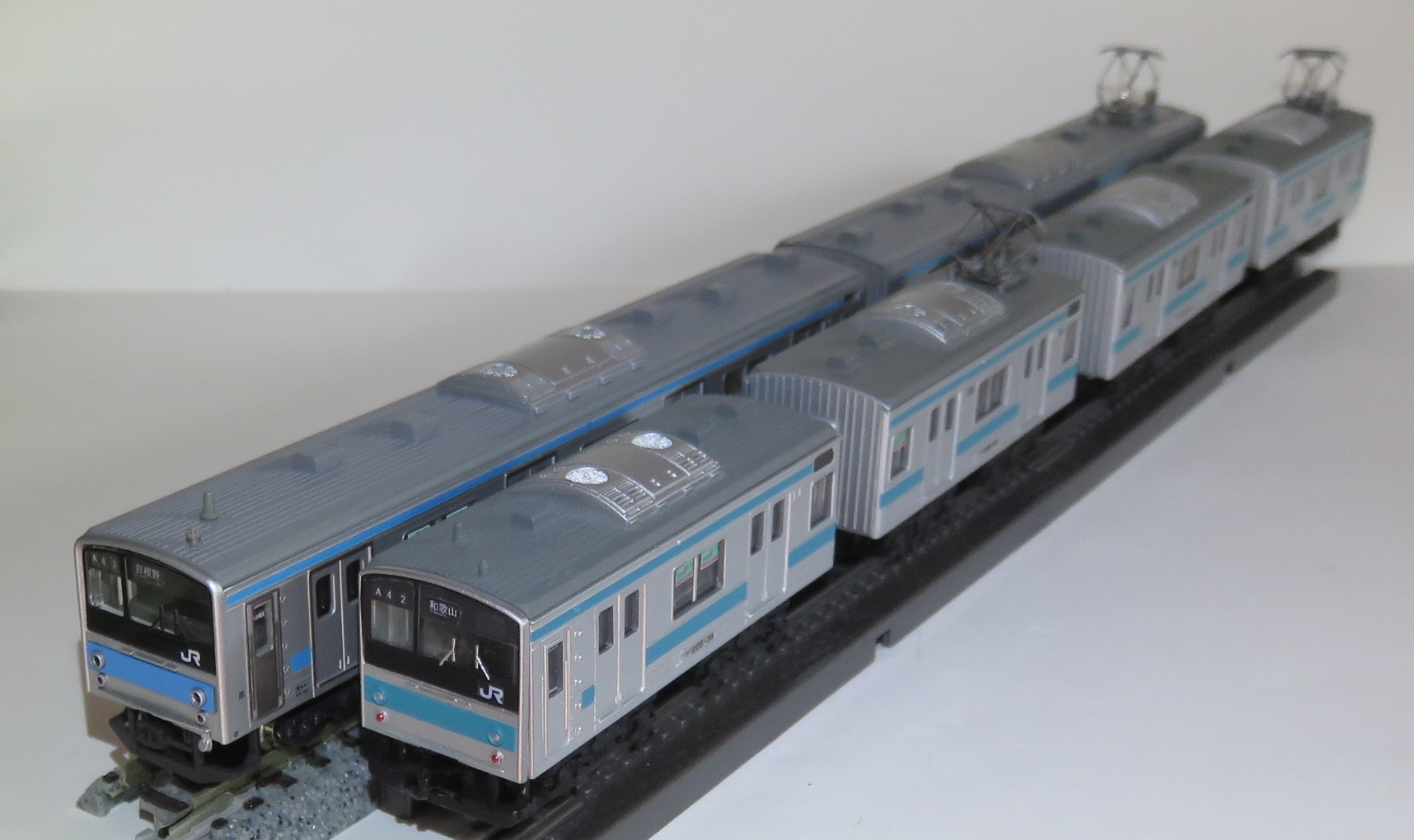
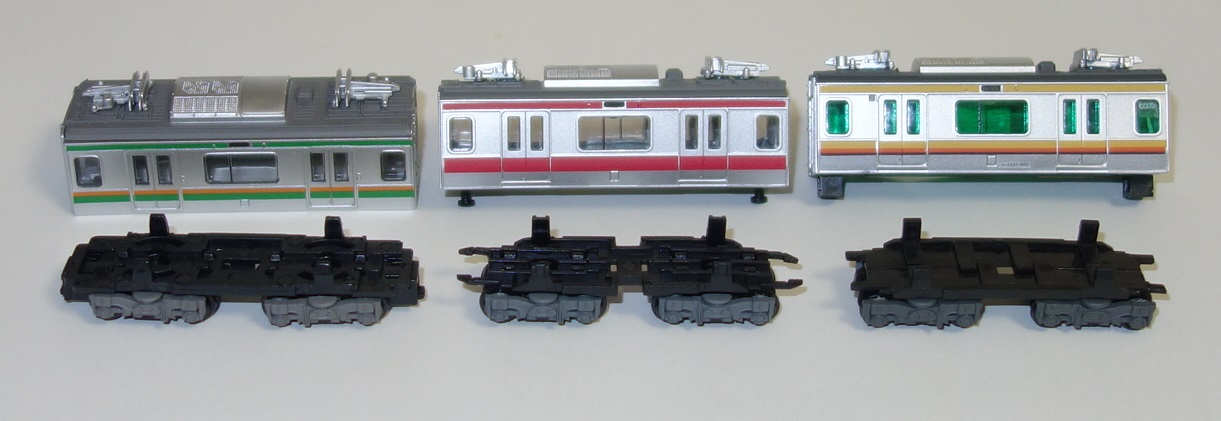
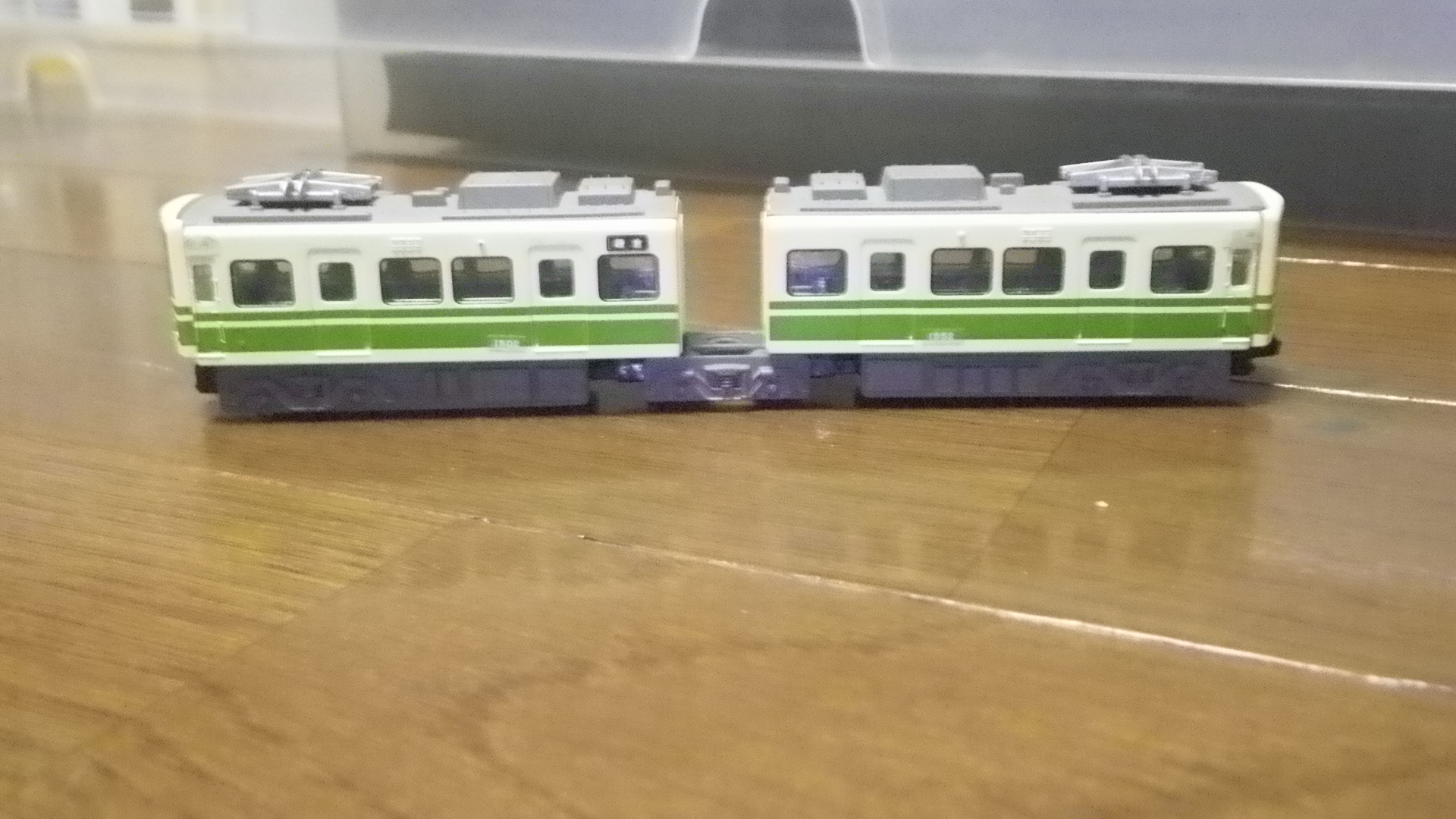

==== Star Wars ====
Bandai has developed kits of the following Star Wars vehicles and figures:

- Millennium Falcon
- X-Wing
- Y-Wing
- Tie fighter

=== Toys ===
- S.H.Figuarts line
  - Kira Yamato
  - Lacus Clyne
- Demon Slayer: Kimetsu no Yaiba Action Figures
  - Tanjiro and Nezuko (2024)
  - "Pocoyo" related products (2010–2012)

=== Transferred to Bandai Spirits ===
- Gunpla
- Robot Spirits

== Corporate structure ==
Bandai's headquarters is in Taitō, Tokyo, Japan. The company owns offices in the United States (Bandai Namco Toys & Collectibles America), Mexico (Bandai Corporación Mexico), the United Kingdom (Bandai Namco Toys & Hobby UK), France, Spain, Taiwan, and mainland China. In the past, it owned offices in Hong Kong, South Korea, Thailand, Germany, and East Asia, which acted as distributors for Bandai products in their respective countries. Bandai is a wholly owned subsidiary of Bandai Namco Holdings and heads its parent's Toy and Hobby Unit.

Bandai is among the largest and most profitable toy companies worldwide, alongside Hasbro and Mattel. The company focuses on creating unique and innovative products for its consumers, and to bend established conventions within the industry; its slogan, "Break out of the box" was made in reference to this.

=== Subsidiaries ===
Bandai Spirits is a spin-off company created in 2018 to handle toys aimed at the hobby market which prior to that year, they were handled by Bandai. Bandai produces confectioneries, board games, and capsule toys through its subsidiary MegaHouse Corporation, which also releases toys and figurines under its MegaToy label. MegaHouse also holds the license for the Rubik's Cube in Japan, and has created multiple variations of the toy specifically for Japanese audiences. Manga series, television shows, and character-themed products are created by the Plex subsidiary.

== List of games by Bandai ==
Bandai developed and published video games for various home consoles, handheld systems and personal computers. Its releases included adaptations of licensed properties, particularly manga and anime franchises, as well as original game projects.

Year	Title	Developer	Platform	Notes
1985	Kinnikuman: Muscle Tag Match	Family Computer	Bandai's first Famicom software release; sold one million units.	
1986	Dragon Ball: Shenron no Nazo	TOSE	Family Computer	Based on the Dragon Ball manga.
1986	Mobile Suit Z Gundam: Hot Scramble	TOSE	Family Computer	Based on the Mobile Suit Gundam franchise.
1987	Pro Golfer Saru: Kage no Tournament	TOSE	Family Computer Disk System	Based on the Pro Golfer Saru manga.
1988	Kamen Rider Black: Taiketsu Shadow Moon	Human Entertainment	Family Computer Disk System	Based on the Kamen Rider Black television series.
1989	Famicom Jump: Hero Retsuden	Bandai	Family Computer	Crossover role-playing game featuring characters from Weekly Shōnen Jump.
1991	Mobile Suit Gundam F91: Formula Senki 0122	Nova Games	Super Famicom	Based on Mobile Suit Gundam F91.
1993	Dragon Ball Z: Super Butōden	TOSE	Super Famicom	Fighting game based on Dragon Ball Z.
1993	Crayon Shin-chan: Arashi o Yobu Enji	Sun L	Super Famicom	Based on the Crayon Shin-chan franchise.
1997	Digimon World	BEC	PlayStation	First console role-playing game in the Digimon video game series.
1999	Minna de Tamagotchi World	Hudson Soft	Nintendo 64	Based on the Tamagotchi virtual pet franchise.
1999	Neon Genesis Evangelion	Gainax	WonderSwan	Role-playing game based on the Neon Genesis Evangelion franchise.
2000	Digimon World 2	BEC	PlayStation	Second main instalment in the Digimon World series.
2001	Mobile Suit Gundam: Zeonic Front	BEC	PlayStation 2	Based on the Mobile Suit Gundam franchise.
2002	Digimon World 3	BEC	PlayStation	Third main instalment in the Digimon World series.
2002	Dragon Ball Z: Budokai	Dimps	PlayStation 2	First instalment in the Dragon Ball Z: Budokai series.
2002	.hack//Infection	CyberConnect2	PlayStation 2	First instalment in the original .hack game series.
2003	Naruto: Ultimate Ninja	CyberConnect2	PlayStation 2	First instalment in the Naruto: Ultimate Ninja series.
2003	.hack//Mutation	CyberConnect2	PlayStation 2	Second instalment in the original .hack game series.
2003	.hack//Outbreak	CyberConnect2	PlayStation 2	Third instalment in the original .hack game series.
2003	.hack series	Multiple platforms	Cumulative shipments of original-character game software in Japan and the United States reached one million units.	
2004	Mobile Suit Gundam video game series	Multiple platforms	Cumulative shipments of Gundam home video games surpassed 20 million units.	
2004	Naruto: Ultimate Ninja 2	CyberConnect2	PlayStation 2	Second instalment in the Naruto: Ultimate Ninja series.
2005	.hack//frägment	CyberConnect2	PlayStation 2	Online-enabled entry in the .hack franchise.
2005	Naruto: Ultimate Ninja 3	CyberConnect2	PlayStation 2	Third instalment in the Naruto: Ultimate Ninja series.

Bandai's video game operations continued to expand into the early 2000s, with releases based on established franchises and original multimedia properties. Following the establishment of Bandai Namco Holdings in September 2005, Bandai and Namco integrated their video game operations on 31 March 2006 to form Namco Bandai Games. Subsequent releases are covered in List of Bandai Namco video games.

== See also ==
- List of game manufacturers
- Fisher-Price
- Hasbro
- LEGO
- Mattel
- Spin Master
- MGA Entertainment
- TOMY
