= Active Life: Extreme Challenge =

2009 video game

- Developer: Tose
- Publisher: Namco Bandai Games
- Series: Active Life
- Platform: Wii
- Release: NA: August 11, 2009; EU: September 25, 2009; JP: December 10, 2009
- Genre: Exergaming
- Modes: Single-player, multiplayer

Active Life: Extreme Challenge (Family Trainer: Extreme Challenge in Europe and Family Trainer 2 in Japan) is a video game for the Wii produced by Namco Bandai Games. It is the sequel to the 2008 game Active Life: Outdoor Challenge and was released on August 11, 2009. It uses a mat to play minigames.

The unique pad controller is designed to connect to the Wii via its GameCube controller ports, which only exist on early Wii models, so the game is incompatible with later Wii models.

== List of minigames ==
- Street Luge
- Double Dutch (Regular)
- Double Dutch (Fusion)
- BASE Jumping
- Kite Surfing
- Inline Skating (Road Race)
- Inline Skating (Big Air)
- BMX (Flat Land)
- BMX (Street)
- BMX (Speed)
- Rock Climbing (Difficult)
- Rock Climbing (Speed)
- Wakeboarding
- Skateboarding (Vertical)
- Skateboarding (Freestyle)

== Reception ==
Active Life: Extreme Challenge received "mixed or average reviews" according to the review aggregator Metacritic, based on 13 critic reviews.

Reception

Aggregate score
Aggregator	Score
Metacritic	56/100

Review scores
Publication	Score
GameZone	5/10
IGN	5/10
