= Splatoon live performances =

Live concerts featuring Splatoon characters

Since 2016, Nintendo has hosted real-world live performances featuring idol characters from its Splatoon series of third-person shooter video games. Said characters are Callie and Marie of the Squid Sisters, Pearl and Marina of Off the Hook, and Shiver, Frye, and Big Man of Deep Cut. Represented as three-dimensional holographic projections, the characters perform to a variety of songs from the Splatoon series, with later events featuring an accompanying live band.

== Background ==
Splatoon is a third-person shooter video game series developed by Nintendo. The series' music is portrayed diegetically, with fictional musical acts performing the songs as heard in-game in a constructed language. The most prominent of these acts are three groups named the Squid Sisters, Off the Hook, and Deep Cut, each debuting in Splatoon (2015), Splatoon 2 (2017), and Splatoon 3 (2022) respectively. These groups consist of idol characters that, alongside songwriting, also inform players of available game modes and playable maps by means of an in-universe news broadcast. Their members are Callie and Marie for the Squid Sisters; Pearl and Marina for Off the Hook; and Shiver, Frye, and Big Man for Deep Cut. These characters have attracted dedicated media attention and been positively received by critics and players. Splatoon's soundtrack itself has been critically acclaimed for its distinctiveness and experimental nature.

Starting in 2016, Nintendo has hosted several concerts showcasing virtual performances by the three musical groups. These concerts generally feature 3D holographic projections of the idol characters accompanied by live music, with real-world musicians performing the games’ soundtracks.

== Production ==
The first Splatoon performances were directed by Yuki Hashiguchi and the mononymous dancer and disc jockey (DJ) Melochin. Hashiguchi was enlisted for his past work with Dwango directing live events for Vocaloid characters and VTuber personalities. He reached out to Melochin, a longtime acquaintace, because he believed the mood of the Splatoon events matched her free-flowing musical identity; he did not want the music to be confined to hip hop or rock, for example. Additionally, Melochin herself was a devoted Splatoon fan who purchased the Wii U solely to play it. He also enlisted the help of bassist Tetsuma Oyama to arrange the events' songs. Hashiguchi stated that the team grew to trust one another and become capable of delivering high-quality performance without explicit directions, bolstered by a shared love for Splatoon.

=== Choreography and motion capture ===
Concept sketches of the dance choreography for Callie and Marie of the Squid Sisters, created by series art director Seita Inoue

For the first-ever concert featuring Callie and Marie of the Squid Sisters, Hashiguchi used a concept created by the Dwango team as a starting point for dialogue with Nintendo. Once the overarching flow and chorus was finalized, Melochin was instructed with composing a rough idea for the choreography for the Squid Sisters that would be sent to Nintendo for comment. She jointly used Oyama's arrangements and her own intrepretations of Splatoon as inspiration for composing the duo's dances. She recalled struggling with slower-paced songs, one of which, "Maritime Memory", had to be completely redesigned. Callie and Marie required more detailed choreography compared to Pearl and Marina of Off the Hook, and revisions were guided by Nintendo's own critiques.

Melochin also served as the motion capture actress for Callie, Marie, Pearl, and Marina. In describing how she approaches portraying each character, she characterized Callie as energetic, Marie as meticulous, Pearl as free-spirited, and Marina as fluid. To embody the characters, Melochin would tell herself phrases such as "Okay, Callie", "Next, Marie", "Pearl's here!", and "Marina's coming in!" She spoke of Pearl as being especially fun to portray, while Marina's swaying movements caused occasional discomfort. Melochin did not consider her performances for Pearl and Marina as being akin to "acting", solely to show off the choreography, but rather as a way to energize the audience and song.

The movements of Callie and Marie were relatively synchronized to convey a complete unit, while the specifics of certain dance moves, such as their playfulness, were modified to reflect the two's distinct personalities. Pearl and Marina meanwhile moved independently of each other, and the non-dancing portions of the performances were improvised by Melochin. She credited her past experience as a DJ and keyboardist as improving her accuracy when portraying Marina using her keytar. For the concert that premiered the song "Nasty Majesty" from Splatoon 2: Octo Expansion (2018), Melochin replayed the final boss of Octo Expansion to replicate the energetic, side-to-side dance moves that Pearl employs during the fight. During the performance, Pearl uses the "Princess Cannon" to fire a large laser beam directed at the audience. The team achieved this by borrowing a large fan and using a combination of light, wind, and smoke to create a blasting effect. The final song Melochin choreographed for the event was "Fly Octo Fly", as a culmination of her directing experience up until then. In a choreography that took only ten minutes to create, Pearl and Marina performed gestures resembling a multitude of weapons from Splatoon 2's multiplayer.

=== Arrangement ===
For the Off the Hook-centric "Haikalive" event, Oyama proposed combining the group's trademark genre of electronic dance music (EDM) with the feel of a live band performance. He insisted that a guitar be included to more effectively bridge the gap between EDM and live band; he also wanted to avoid making Off the Hook's songs too distinct from the Squid Sisters'. Oyama sought to create a distinct form of EDM, without explicit emphasis on beat or dance, that he likened to digital rock. The setlists that would be performed onstage by a band were decided together with series sound director Toru Minegishi.

Oyama found that the arranging process was relatively intuitive. He summarized the Splatoon games' relationship with diegetic music as songs that exist because of the games and which enhance said games. In observing this, he wanted people unfamiliar with Splatoon to enjoy the concerts for the music alone, and existing Splatoon fans to effectively relive the games through the music. The single song that Oyama spent the most time arranging was "Fresh Start", a song from the single-player campaign of Splatoon 2 (2017). He held a special attachment to the song as he had then recently completed the campaign, and wanted to make the audience emotional as well. To do this, he emphasized a backing piano track to elevate the song's sentimentality. He created about five to six renditions of "Fresh Start" in total.

== List of concerts ==
=== Splatoon (2016) ===
Date	Event	Title	Country	Venue	Performer(s)	Notes	Ref.
January 30, 2016	Niconico Tokaigi 2016	Shiokalive	Japan	Makuhari Messe	Squid Sisters	—N/a	
April 29, 2016	Niconico Chokaigi 2016	Shiokalive	Japan	Makuhari Messe	Squid Sisters	—N/a	
July 8, 2016	Japan Expo 2016	Squid Sisters Concert	France	Parc des Expositions de Villepinte	Squid Sisters	First international performance, with translated footage shared online.	
November 3, 2016	Niconico Choparty 2016	Shiokalive	Japan	Saitama Super Arena	Squid Sisters	—N/a	

=== Splatoon 2 (2018–2019) ===
Date	Event	Title	Country	Venue	Performer(s)	Notes	Ref.
February 10, 2018	Niconico Tokaigi 2018	Haikalive	Japan	Makuhari Messe	Off the Hook; Squid Sisters (Note: Guest appearance)	—N/a	
March 31, 2018	Polymanga 2018	Off the Hook Concert	Switzerland	Montreux Music & Convention Centre	Off the Hook; Squid Sisters	Held as part of the Splatoon 2 European Championship.	
April 28, 2018	Niconico Chokaigi 2018	Haikalive	Japan	Makuhari Messe	Off the Hook; Squid Sisters	Premiered the song “Nasty Majesty” from the Octo Expansion DLC.	
January 26, 2019	Niconico Tokaigi 2019	Tentalive	Japan	Makuhari Messe	Off the Hook	Marketed as Off the Hook’s first solo concert, later released internationally on YouTube and Blu-ray.	
October 13–14, 2019	Nintendo Live 2019	Haikalive Kyoto Mix	Japan	Kyoto International Conference Center	Off the Hook; Squid Sisters	Featured a guest appearance by K.K. Slider from Animal Crossing.	

=== Splatoon 3 (2022–present) ===
Date	Event	Title	Country	Venue	Performer(s)	Notes	Ref.
October 8–9, 2022	Nintendo Live 2022	Bankalive	Japan	Tokyo Big Sight	Deep Cut; Squid Sisters	Introduced Deep Cut as the featured idol group ahead of the Splatoon 3 release.	
February 10, 2024	Nintendo Live 2024	Bankalive Gou	Japan	Ota City General Gymnasium	Deep Cut; Off the Hook	Originally scheduled for January in Tokyo but canceled due to security threats. A pre-recorded concert was streamed on February 10, 2024, alongside a performance from The Legend of Zelda orchestral concert.	
