= Splatoon Raiders =

2026 video game

- Cover art, depicting Shiver (left), the Mechanic (center), Frye (right), and Big Man (center top)
- Developer: Nintendo EPD (Note: Additional work by Monolith Soft, Nintendo Studios Singapore, SRD, Bandai Namco Studios Malaysia, and Bandai Namco Studios)
- Publisher: Nintendo
- Director: Yoshihiko Ito
- Producer: Seita Inoue
- Designer: Kenji Matsumoto
- Programmer: Takuto Asaka
- Artist: Koji Sonoyama
- Composer: Toshiyuki Sudo
- Series: Splatoon
- Platform: Nintendo Switch 2
- Release: July 23, 2026
- Genres: Third-person shooter, action role-playing
- Modes: Single-player, multiplayer

Splatoon Raiders (Note: Japanese: スプラトゥーンレイダース, Hepburn: Supuratūn Reidāsu) is a 2026 third-person shooter game developed and published by Nintendo for the Nintendo Switch 2. It is a spin-off of the Splatoon series and the first installment to be fully single-player and story-focused, unlike the multiplayer-centric mainline entries. Set on the remote Spirhalite Islands, (Note: Pronounced /ˈspaɪ.rʌ.laɪt/, SPY-ruh-lyte) Raiders follows a mechanic, accompanied by Shiver, Frye, and Big Man of the idol group Deep Cut, as they explore the islands in search of treasure and are intercepted by its hostile inhabitants called Salmonids.

Raiders has the player traverse various levels scattered about the Spirhalite Islands to collect treasure and kill Salmonids using any of 100 available weapons. Raiders introduces "gadgets", secondary armaments linked to one of three types of player-worn "ink tanks" that enable mobile, aggressive, or strategic fighting options. The player is accompanied by the Exploration Bot, a vehicle operated by either Shiver, Frye, or Big Man that assists in combat.

Development on Raiders began during the later period of the update cycle for Splatoon 3 (2022), around September 2024. Inspired by the cooperative Splatoon game mode Salmon Run, developers wanted to offer a unique gameplay experience from previous Splatoon games and create an approachable entry point to the series for newcomers. The gadget system was intended to provide more dynamic movement and combat options. While the Spirhalite Islands were at first designed with a light-hearted, tropical resort-like aesthetic, the team opted to make them dilapidated and unsettling. Deep Cut was chosen to take center stage in the story as the developers felt they had been inadequately explored as characters in the single-player campaign of Splatoon 3.

Splatoon Raiders was released on July 23, 2026. It received generally positive reviews from critics, being praised for its core gameplay structure, gadget system, and multiplayer functionality, while opinions towards its art direction were more divisive. In comparing Raiders to previous installments' single-player campaigns, numerous reviewers hailed it as one of the best single-player Splatoon experiences. As of September 30, 2026, the game has sold 2.42 million copies.

== Gameplay ==
Splatoon Raiders is a spin-off of the Splatoon series and is primarily single-player and story-focused, unlike the multiplayer-centric mainline entries. Raiders is a third-person shooter, borrowing some gameplay elements from the looter shooter subgenre, that revolves around the usage of ink as ammunition. Submerging into the liquid replenishes said ammunition as well as the player's health. Ink also serves as a method of navigation, as players can swim through their own colored ink. They are conversely slowed down when in contact with enemies' ink. Players choose to be either an Inkling or Octoling, a humanoid squid and octopus respectively, as their player character, who takes on the role of a mechanic. Their avatar's physical appearance can be manually tweaked and adorned with various outfits.

An Inkling fighting Salmonids in an open-ended level

Each of the game's over 100 total weapons are divided amongst eleven classes, all of which return from past Splatoon entries. Said weapons are based on paint rollers, paint brushes, water guns, bows and arrows, and others. They are differentiated in level and rarity; a higher level indicates greater attack strength, while rarer weapons can come with "weapon powers" that grant specialized effects. Using these weapons, players fight hostile salmon-like enemies known as Salmonids. Killing them is rewarded with random weapons and experience points needed to level up. Returning from Salmon Run are two categories of Salmonid, known as Lesser Salmonids and Boss Salmonids. Raiders introduces Seasoned Salmonids, stronger variations on existing Salmonids. The player is accompanied by a vehicle called the Exploration Bot that is piloted by one of three Deep Cut members. Within the Exploration Bot, said member shoots enemies, provides a powerful special ability known as a "showstopper", and allows the player to bounce upwards to gain vertical height.

Raiders introduces secondary armaments known as "gadgets", which supplant the "sub weapons" from previous Splatoon games. Gadgets enable specialized maneuvers or powered attacks, and each is linked to one of three player-worn "ink tanks"—the Speed Tank, Power Tank, and Tactical Tank—with unique characteristics. Gadgets for the Speed Tank favor high mobility, those for the Power Tank center on aggressive combat, and those for the Tactical Tank enable more strategic fighting options. For example, the Flywire is a Speed Tank gadget that acts as a grappling hook to travel large distances; the Splatchet is a Power Tank gadget which lets the player kill multiple enemies with one sweeping slash; and the Bombloons are a Tactical Tank gadget that function as ink-filled explosives physically linked to one another. Gadgets' abilities can themselves be augmented using "gadget parts" obtained from enemies or treasure chests at the end of levels.

The game's levels, referred to as "dungeons", fall under five categories. These include linear, goal-oriented levels; open-ended, explorable islands that require the player to collect a specific number of "power eggs" obtained from Salmonids; multi-level dungeons whose floors must be completed within a time limit; contained arenas that constantly spawn Salmonids; and puzzle gauntlets that act as tutorials for the game's gadget system. Completing dungeons or leveling up grants "skill points", which can be spent to enhance the player's health, main weapon strength, gadget power, and others. After completing enough levels, the player is given the option to replay earlier ones in more difficult "Spicy" and "Super Spicy" modes, which alters the variety, placements, and volume of Salmonids.

Alongside its single-player mode, Raiders also features a cooperative mode that allows up to four players, either locally or online, to play at once. After reaching a specific level, a player can "go help" someone else online through randomized matchmaking. In co-op mode, the game's difficulty is adjusted depending on how many players are present. Raiders is playable in three different difficulty settings that only affect Salmonid strength: Tourist, Raider, and Survivalist.

== Synopsis ==
=== Setting ===
The Splatoon series takes place 12,000 years into the far future on a post-apocalyptic Earth following the extinction of humans and most mammals, implied to be the result of rampant climate change. After this event, the planet is repopulated with evolved, terrestrial marine animals who in the present day reside in the regions of Inkadia and the Splatlands. Such creatures include the Inklings and Octolings, humanoid squids and octopuses respectively. Within the Splatlands is the hub world of Splatoon 3, a city known as Splatsville. Shiver, Frye, and Big Man of the idol group Deep Cut host the city's news broadcasts, while the Mechanic is a Splatsville resident. Also within the Splatlands is the remote Spirhalite Islands; they are so distant from the mainland that they have their own climate and travel by helicopter is required to reach them.

The Salmonids previously appeared in Splatoon 2 (2017) and Splatoon 3 as hostile enemies in the Salmon Run game mode. The Salmonids depicted in Raiders are a "local variety" of the species native to the Spirhalite Islands. Having migrated from elsewhere, these Salmonids became so captivated by the deliciousness of Spirhalite, crystals with unusual properties, that they have since forgotten their original homeland. Some time before the events of Raiders, a specific Salmonid, named "Salmon", discovered that a powerful creature could be created by mixing Salmonid roe with Spirhalite. "Salmon" became the first generation of the Salmonarch, with the second generation onwards consisting of Salmonids born from this mixing technique. The current iteration of the Salmonarch is of the seventh generation. The Salmonids of the Spirhalite Islands interpret the Milky Way in the night sky as their mother river, and worship the Salmonarch, who is capable of generating large tornado-like storms, as a benevolent, guiding figure.

=== Plot ===
Splatsville accrues a debt of over 60 billion G, (Note: "G" is used to indicate the games' in-universe currency.) which occurs amid reports of the fabled Spirhalite Islands resurfacing from the ocean due to a shift in the Earth's tectonic plates. Shiver, Frye, and Big Man hire the Mechanic to fly them to the archipelago via helicopter, with the goal of selling its treasure to pay off Splatsville's debt. Nearing the islands, the crew spots a golden glow from within their center, encircled by a spiralling storm. The glow abruptly pulsates and attracts the helicopter and surrounding fog into the center, forcing the Mechanic to make a crash landing.

In the month since the crash, the group constructs a makeshift base called the Hideout Ship. (Note: The events that occurred during this month are depicted in "Deep Cut's Island Misadventures", a prologue comic series published through the Nintendo Today app.) When the Mechanic is dispatched to the islands to acquire extra materials, they encounter hostile Salmonids that drop Power Eggs upon defeat. After ridding the site of the Salmonids, they discover a derelict machine called the Exploration Bot that, once fixed, automatically locates nearby treasure and can be piloted by a member of Deep Cut. After the team reunites with Frye's tamed eels and Shiver's tamed shark, Master Mega, they follow a trail of treasure marked by the Exploration Bot.

In their journey, the group collects relics from an ancient, now-fallen Salmonid civilization and uncovers documents scattered across the islands authored by a past explorer, revealed as the creator of the Exploration Bot. Further documents from the explorer, who never escaped the islands, warn that "gold" in the islands' center would "drive Salmonids mad". Once defeating three Salmonid bosses, Deep Cut and the Mechanic discover three mysterious devices that require the members of Deep Cut to sing traditional tunes to activate them. The devices show constellations of a golden object, the storm that brought them to the islands, and a giant three-headed beast.

At the center of the Spirhalite Islands, the group locates the golden object: a giant levitating Power Egg. Energy from within the Power Egg bursts into light rays that pierce the sky to create seven rings, causing Salmonids across the world to invade cities on land. After the Power Egg descends down a tunnel, the team chase after it. In their attempt to crack it open, the three-headed monster, the Salmonarch, hatches from it. Deep Cut rescues the Mechanic using the Hideout Ship's crane before being flung onto floating islands in the sky. The team uses the crane to destroy the Salmonarch's heads. Nearing defeat, a large crystal drill forms in the heads' place. Using the Exploration Bot, Frye's eels, and Master Mega, the group destroys the Salmonarch, ends the worldwide cataclysm, and returns home.

In a secret ending, the group acquires an immensely valuable "legendary relic" on the one-hundredth floor of the Bottomless Buffet, after defeating a violent Salmonid named Lord Saltimatum. If the Mechanic collected every prior Salmonid relic, a post-credits illustration depicts Deep Cut spreading the spoils of their treasure hunting across Splatsville.

== Development ==
Splatoon Raiders was first conceived during the later period of Splatoon 3's update cycle, in parallel with the production of that game's Grand Festival event held in September 2024. The team wanted to explore the potential of a single-player version of Salmon Run, a cooperative game mode in previous Splatoon entries that involved attacking hordes of Salmonids to deposit their Golden Eggs into a container. They felt that such gameplay adapted for single-player would be "hectic yet exhilarating". When asked why the team created a single-player spin-off following Splatoon 3 as opposed to a fourth mainline installment, producer Seita Inoue stated that Raiders was partly intended to be an entry point to the series for newcomers by leveraging the strengths of Splatoon's non-competitive features. Raiders inherited the experimental design philosophy of both downloadable content (DLC) single-player campaigns of past installments, those being Splatoon 2: Octo Expansion (2018) and Splatoon 3: Side Order (2024).

=== Gameplay ===
In reworking Salmon Run's gameplay into a digestible single-player format, the team needed to make it feasible "for one person to do what was done with four people". Their first approach was to add equippable traps that the player would lay around them to assist in combat, akin to tower defense gameplay. This approach was rejected because developers thought that building fortified defenses and "watching it play out" was too disparate from Splatoon's active gameplay structure. They instead designed secondary armaments that would augment the player's regular capabilities, granting more dynamic movement and combat options. These armaments evolved into the gadgets, which Inoue and director Yoshihiko Ito hoped would give players satisfaction in optimizing their strategies to defeat large hordes of enemies. The three tank classes came about as a way to help players narrow down which of fifteen gadgets they wanted to choose. The team replayed the game numerous times in order to balance the various gadget combinations.

The number of enemies onscreen, which could overwhelm players, proved challenging to work around for sound director Shu Tamura, who felt it was necessary to "[make] it possible for players to understand what's going on through sound". Raiders' gameplay was initially going to also involve depositing Golden Eggs, specifically requiring players to place Golden Eggs into a drill to power its excavation. Additionally, one scrapped gadget acted as a Golden Egg conveyor belt. This framework persisted until the middle stages of development; it was partially vetoed as the team wanted to place more emphasis on the gadget system. Wanting to still give players a reason to be mobile, they retained the Golden Eggs themselves but removed the need to deposit them. Without needing to consider multiplayer balance or unfair level geometry, the team added more options for vertical mobility, by way of the Exploration Bot, as a distinct selling point. To make the game more accessible for Splatoon newcomers, they added difficulty settings and online functionality to allow troubled players to ask for assistance during levels. When playing online, the strength of Salmonids is balanced to each player's level. For example, if a level 10 player and a level 50 player are together, the former will fight Salmonids who, from their perspective, are also at level 10, while the latter fight Salmonids who are at level 50. This was achieved by calculating the damage taken against Salmonids as a proportion of their health rather than a fixed number.

The arcade minigames were not planned initially, but implemented after three passionate staff members created their own prototypes. Meant to be a relaxing distraction, the minigames intentionally do not yield valuable rewards. All of their pixel art illustrations were designed by series producer Hisashi Nogami, who took regular suggestions from other staff.

=== Art direction and characters ===
Concept art depicting tropical resorts occupied by Salmonids. This approach was ultimately rejected because the light-hearted aesthetic inadvertently made playtesters feel guilty over attacking the Salmonids.

Numerous "spiral" and "spinning" motifs are present throughout the game, made in reference to Raiders being a "spin"-off. As Raiders was set to have unique gameplay from previous Splatoon entries, the developers wanted the game's setting to be located far away from those of said entries. Deeming remote islands a logical fit, they wanted to capitalize on the Switch 2's processing power to create natural, organic landscapes, contrasting the artificial environments of multiplayer stages in past games. The team designed the Spirhalite Islands as "full of adventure" with bright, refreshing scenery backed by resort-like music. While they initially thought these environments made for a fun experience, internal playtesters began expressing guilt in attacking the Salmonids, whom art director Koji Sonoyama felt "were simply going about their lives happily on the island, and it became a bit difficult to accept emotionally".

At this point in development, neither the Salmonids nor fundamental level design could be altered much, so they chose to rework the setting from the ground up to resemble an "outlandish environment". To this end, the islands' geology was built to evoke a sense of discomfort, with "the eeriness of landscapes shaped by geological shifts, where elements from the sea and mountains coexist". The Salmonids were also designed to appear unpredictable and unsettling.

Shiver, Frye, and Big Man had previously appeared in the single-player campaign of Splatoon 3 as antagonists, but the developers felt they had not been adequately explored as characters. Wanting to have them take center stage, the team gave them the role of both guides to the player and agents to move the story forward. Feeling that Deep Cut themselves were not fit to use gadgets, they decided to create a "somewhat reserved, craftsman-like character who could create anything, even in harsh conditions", who became the Mechanic. Their design was directly influenced by their deserted island surroundings. The team felt that in this environment, the Mechanic's hair would naturally grow out, but in such a way that would allow them to style it using objects washed ashore. The developers envisioned the Mechanic being an avatar of the player, and thus did not give them a defined personality. Despite this, Sonoyama described them as being distinct from past Splatoon protagonists. As opposed to "the popular kids who are at the center of the excitement in school", he equated the Mechanic to "a hobbyist who quietly pursues their passions in the corner of the classroom".

=== Music ===
In composing the music of the Spirhalite Islands, Tamura had the goal of making tunes that would be appealing to the Salmonids but unnerving to the Inklings or Octolings. The music that plays within the game's dungeons are attributed to in-universe Salmonid bands. Tamura used the cello to compose these groups' songs. In order to create a unique musical atmosphere, Tamura applied a specialized technique for cello playing that involves using two bows to strum simultaneously. He also utilized a specific kind of bow called the Bach bow whose underside is flat, using it to "add pressure to the sound". The music that plays on open-ended beach and volcano levels is not attributed to any one group, written as being "more like field recording of local Salmonids freely jamming together".

Tamura wanted to create a clear musical contrast between the tunes of the Hideout Ship and the Spirhalite Islands' dungeons, as he assumed players would become bored otherwise. To this end, the Hideout Ship's music is light-hearted to convey the fun-loving personalities of Deep Cut and the Mechanic, while the backing tracks of dungeons represent eeriness and danger. Since early in development, the team wanted Deep Cut to have a central role in the game's final battle. In an effort to create an impactful climax and dynamic narrative, the earlier portions of the game are dominated by Salmonid music while a new Deep Cut track is reserved for the ending.

== Release ==
Splatoon Raiders was first announced on the Nintendo Today app on June 10, 2025, alongside a new update for Splatoon 3. On April 21, 2026, Nintendo released a trailer on Nintendo Today and YouTube, revealing the release date of July 23, 2026.

A new gameplay trailer was unveiled in a Nintendo Direct presentation held on June 9, as well as a dedicated Raiders Direct scheduled for June 30. Two promotional tie-ins were also announced: a set of Joy-Con 2 controllers with colors themed after Deep Cut, and a Splatfest event for Splatoon 3 that was held from July 10 to 12. Beginning from June 23 to the game's release on July 23, "Deep Cut's Island Misadventures", a comic series featuring the Mechanic and Deep Cut set before the events of the game, was released exclusively on Nintendo Today. From July 23 to 26 during San Diego Comic-Con, playable demos of Raiders and Nintendo Switch Sports Resort (2026) were available at Nintendo-hosted booths.

=== Post-release ===
On launch day, Raiders received an update that adjusted the in-game music and fixed several bugs, and nine tracks from the game's soundtrack were added to Nintendo Music. The following August, another patch was released, fixing additional bugs and making gameplay adjustments. The following November, a free demo of the game was released on the Nintendo eShop, containing three stages from the main game. An official 336-page art book for Raiders, consisting of over 5,000 pieces of concept art, is set to be published by Kadokawa on February 9, 2027.

Inoue stated in an interview with Famitsu magazine that, because Raiders was developed "with the goal of providing a complete experience as is", there were no plans for DLC or balancing updates, unlike the main entries in the series, which received balancing adjustments and content additions. Despite this, he stated that if any critical bugs were found, they would be addressed.

== Reception ==
Reception

Aggregate scores
Aggregator	Score
Metacritic	82/100 (Note: Score based on 117 reviews)
OpenCritic	87% recommend (Note: Score based on 136 reviews)

Review scores
Publication	Score
Destructoid	8.5/10
Eurogamer	4/5
Game Informer	8.8/10
GameSpot	8/10
GamesRadar+	8/10
IGN	9/10
Nintendo Life	9/10

Splatoon Raiders received "generally favorable" reviews according to review aggregation website Metacritic, and 87% of critics recommended the game on OpenCritic. In comparing Raiders to past installments' single-player campaigns, numerous critics hailed it as among the best Splatoon single-player experiences.

Raiders' gameplay structure was deemed enjoyably frenetic and engaging. Christian Donlan of Eurogamer felt a constant sense of "forward momentum", with hectic combat he likened to both contemporary Doom titles and Donkey Kong Bananza (2025). Logan Plant from IGN hailed it as one of the best Switch 2 games, praising its gameplay, focus on experimentation, difficulty curve, and "roguelike" mission structure. Alex Olney of Nintendo Life lauded the raw power of the new variations of Salmonids, as well as the Spicy mode that he felt significantly heightened the game's replay value. While he found the gameplay itself excellent, he opined that Raiders did little to reinvent the core Splatoon formula. In an early access review, Tashi of Denfaminico Gamer found that the inclusion of new aerial movement mechanics significantly elevated the depth of gameplay. GameSpot's Steve Watts complimented the game as a flexibile addition to the series, hoping that Raiders "marks a new beginning for Splatoon that can live alongside the multiplayer games".

The game's gadget system elicited praise. Donlan believed that gadgets were an engaging way to tinker with various gameplay strategies that sidestepped the need for a "system of torturous intricacy". Olney appreciated the extent of gadget customizability, as did Watts and Plant. Jordan Minor of PCMag wrote of relic powers and miscellaneous ability upgrades as promoting a sense of "creative potential" that sidestepped "the annoying tedium common in many other looter shooters". Ozzie Mejia of Shacknews similarly complimented Raiders' philosophy of mechanical depth in building loadouts, but found it slightly inferior compared to that of other looter shooters. Kenta Hatanaka of Game Watch lauded the trial-and-error nature of the gadget system as "so enjoyable that you'll lose track of time". Tashi complimented the fact that using gadgets does not consume ink as providing a more stress-free gameplay experience compared to past entries, where ink management is a more pertinent aspect.

Raiders' multiplayer functionality was reviewed favorably. Olney called Raiders' implementation of multiplayer simple yet effective. He appreciated that level progress is shared between players, allowing the game to be played solely in multiplayer if desired. Rivera remarked that the bite-sized nature of dungeons lent itself to cooperative play, to the extent that Raiders' single-player mode felt lacking in comparison. Luke Kemp of GamesRadar+ found novelty in the randomized nature of the "go help" feature, but wrote that the game could have benefitted from using skill-based matchmaking to prevent exceedingly low-level players being forced to help higher-level ones. Pramath of GamingBolt admired a lack of significant network connectivity mishaps while in multiplayer; he found this necessary to emphasize due to Nintendo's, and the original Switch's, past failings with implementing smooth online infrastructure.

Reception towards the game's art direction was more divisive. Donlan appreciated the "wonderfully grim" visuals of the Spirhalite Islands as an evolution of the offbeat style of Salmon Run. Rebekah Valentine of Kotaku conversely perceived all of the game's level themes as too disconnected from one another and too often repeated to effectively communicate a "lived-in world". Plant criticized Raiders' levels as aesthetically uninteresting; he believed their muted color palettes were too dissimilar to past Splatoon games. The game's narrative was perceived by critics as a simplistic but serviceable affair. Plant found that the story added "plenty of interesting details to Splatoon's excellent world", while Tashi and Vanilla Kondo of Famitsu praised Deep Cut's characterization. Joshua Rivera of The Guardian conversely took issue with the story's simplicity, finding it particularly uncompelling.

=== Sales ===
Splatoon Raiders debuted at No. 1 in Japanese sales charts maintained by Famitsu, recording 474,684 copies sold in its first week, ahead of Rhythm Heaven Groove and Tomodachi Life: Living the Dream (both 2026). As of September 30, 2026, Raiders has sold 2.42 million copies worldwide.
