= Nintendo Today =

Mobile app

Nintendo Today!
- App icon

- Nintendo Today's home menu in the Mario theme on December 14, 2025
- Type: Digital calendar / news
- Launched: March 27, 2025; 17 months ago
- Platforms: Android; iOS
- Status: Active

Nintendo Today (stylized as Nintendo Today!) is a digital calendar and news mobile app by Nintendo that primarily centers around delivering news relating to their products, as well as informing users of upcoming real life and in-game events through the use of a calendar. The service is available for anyone with a Nintendo Account. Nintendo Today was announced in a Nintendo Direct presentation on March 27, 2025, and released the same day for Android and iOS.

== Features ==
Users can select themes for the app based on Mario, The Legend of Zelda, Splatoon, Animal Crossing, Pikmin, Kirby, Donkey Kong, and Fire Emblem. Users can then choose the Nintendo series that they are interested in from a selection of their franchises. Users can also allow for dates relating to certain events in select Nintendo Switch and mobile titles, Nintendo Switch Online content releases (including classic game and Nintendo Music soundtrack releases), Nintendo Directs, game releases, and in-person events to be displayed on the in-app calendar. The news and content of the app updates daily, with news on the Nintendo Switch 2 released daily after the broadcast of the console's Nintendo Direct presentation. Besides broadcasting the latest Nintendo news and events, Nintendo Today also delivers comics, non-news-related videos, quizzes, and other similar content based on the user's preferences. The app also supports the Widgets feature on iOS, allowing users on the platform to display the calendar and content on the user's Lock and Home Screens.

== Announcement and release ==
Nintendo Today was announced at the end of a Nintendo Direct broadcast on March 27, 2025, and was released shortly after on Android and iOS devices.

Nintendo Today was used on multiple occasions to exclusively to announce news about their franchises. One day after Nintendo Today was released, on March 28, 2025, Nintendo announced the release date for The Legend of Zelda film for 2027. On June 10, 2025, Nintendo announced an update for Splatoon 3 alongside a new game, Splatoon Raiders. On April 9, 2026, Nintendo released a trailer and announced the release date for the game Rhythm Heaven Groove through the app. On April 21, 2026, Nintendo released a trailer and announced the release date for Splatoon Raiders through the app.

Nintendo Today was also used to promote the 2026 film The Super Mario Galaxy Movie. Users can log into the app every day to collect forty digital collectible cards and use the "check-in" feature in the movie theater to unlock photo frames and wallpapers after scanning the movie poster.
