= Ryo Nagamatsu =

Japanese video game composer

- 永松亮
- Born: October 25, 1982 (age 44)
- Occupations: Composer; pianist; sound designer
- Years active: 2006–present
- Employers: Nintendo (2006–2023); RH Music (2023–present)
- Musical career
- Genres: Video game music; Orchestral
- Instrument: Piano
- Website: http://rh-music.co.jp/

Ryo Nagamatsu (Japanese: 永松亮, Hepburn: Nagamatsu Ryō; born 25 October 1982) is a Japanese composer who primarily works on video game music. Formerly employed by Nintendo, he is currently the CEO of RH Music Co., Ltd.

Nagamatsu has worked as a composer on a number of major Nintendo franchises, including Mario Kart Wii, New Super Mario Bros. Wii, and Splatoon 3.

== Biography ==
Nagamatsu began to play the piano from a young age. In 2006, he won the Composition Award for his piece "The Day the World Warms Up" at the "Record-Con" music contest organised by Shimamura Music.

Following his graduation from Sasebo College in 2006, Nagamatsu was hired to Nintendo's Entertainment Analysis & Development division as a part of its sound team. That year, he contributed his first score to a video game with Wii Play, working alongside Shinobu Nagata. The subsequent year, he composed the entirety of the soundtrack for Big Brain Academy: Wii Degree. The title track from this game was later released physically as a part of the Touch! Generations soundtrack CD, which was made available through the Club Nintendo customer loyalty program.

In 2008, he composed the music for Mario Kart Wii alongside Asuka Hayazaki, serving as his first work on the Mario franchise. Nagamatsu created around half of the course themes as well as the battle themes. He also created some of the sound effects for the game, most notably for the kart horns. This was followed by composing for New Super Mario Bros. Wii the subsequent year, working with sound director Kenta Nagata and Shiho Fujii. In 2010, he composed for Super Mario Galaxy 2 with Koji Kondo and Mahito Yokota, who both composed for the previous Super Mario Galaxy. This was his first work on an orchestral score, having desired to compose orchestral music since he joined, particularly after Super Mario Galaxy also included orchestral music. He found the experience particularly stressful to the point he struggled to sleep at night.

In 2012, he scored Nintendo Land. As it includes minigames based on existing Nintendo franchises, the game features several arrangements of music from the respective franchises. It also includes a number of original compositions, particularly for the Octopus Dance minigame based on the Game & Watch game Octopus, as the original game did not include music. He was given a deal of creative freedom, while having original composers such as Kondo review his tracks and provide feedback. He also composed for The Legend of Zelda: A Link Between Worlds, which also includes a number of arrangements of music from The Legend of Zelda: A Link to the Past. While the music features an orchestral style, he stated that using a live orchestra was never considered due to the reverberation and low pitch sounds produced that would be unsuitable for the Nintendo 3DS speakers, although he performed the recorder on tracks that play in the Milk Bar.

In addition to his work as a composer, he has also engaged in film production. In 2017, he won the Next Sphere Award at the Toyama International Film Festival for his short film Yamabikoyama, in which he served as lead actor, screenwriter, director, composer, sound effects designer, and editor.

In 2019, he arranged and composed new music for The Legend of Zelda: Link's Awakening, a remake of the 1993 game of the same name for the Game Boy. He utilized a small orchestra of live performers, stating that a large one would not have fit the visuals.

On 30 April 2023, Nagamatsu resigned from Nintendo and established RH Music Co., Ltd., becoming its representative director.

== Works ==
Year	Title	Notes	Ref.
2006	Wii Play	Music with Shinobu Nagata	
2007	Big Brain Academy: Wii Degree	Music	
2008	Mario Kart Wii	Music with Asuka Hayazaki	
2009	Wii Sports Resort	Music	
2009	New Super Mario Bros. Wii	Music with Kenta Nagata and Shiho Fujii	
2010	Super Mario Galaxy 2	Music with Mahito Yokota and Koji Kondo	
2011	Press Start: Symphony of Games	Concert; orchestral arrangements of tracks from Super Mario Galaxy 2	
2012	Nintendo Land	Music	
2013	The Legend of Zelda: A Link Between Worlds	Music	
2014	Mario Kart 8	Music with Atsuko Asahi, Shiho Fujii, and Yasuaki Iwata	
2014	Super Smash Bros. for Nintendo 3DS / Wii U	Arrangements with various others	
2015	The Legend of Zelda: Tri Force Heroes	Music	
2016	Tank Troopers	Music	
2017	Splatoon 2	Music with Toru Minegishi and Shiho Fujii	
2018	Splatoon 2: Octo Expansion	Music with Toru Minegishi	
2018	Super Smash Bros. Ultimate	Arrangements with various others	
2019	The Legend of Zelda: Link's Awakening	Music	
2020	Mario Kart Live: Home Circuit	Music	
2022	Mario Kart 8 Deluxe	Booster Course Pass DLC; music with various others	
2022	Splatoon 3	Music with various others	
2024	Splatoon 3: Side Order	Music with various others	
2024	The Strongest Tofu	Music	
2025	Tribe Nine	Music with Masafumi Takada	
2025	HYKE:Northern Light(s)	Music with Yasuaki Iwata and Reo Uratani	
2025	Hello Kitty Skyland	Music	
2026	Denshattack!	Music with various others	
2026	Tanuki: Pon's Summer	"Summer Excitement"	
