= Splatoon 3: Side Order =

Single-player expansion pack to Splatoon 3

- Cover art, depicting Pearl as a drone (left) and Agent 8 (right)
- Developer: Nintendo EPD
- Publisher: Nintendo
- Directors: Kenji Matsumoto; Seita Inoue
- Artist: Seita Inoue
- Composers: Toshiyuki Sudo; Toru Minegishi; Yumi Takahashi; Kairi Hamada; Asuka Hayazaki; Masato Ohashi
- Series: Splatoon
- Platform: Nintendo Switch
- Release: 22 February 2024
- Genres: Third-person shooter, roguelite
- Mode: Single-player

Splatoon 3: Side Order (Note: Japanese: スプラトゥーン3 サイド・オーダー, Hepburn: Supuratūn Surī: Saido Ōdā) is a 2024 downloadable content (DLC) expansion pack for the single-player mode of Splatoon 3 (2022), a third-person shooter video game developed and published by Nintendo for the Nintendo Switch.

Side Order follows an Octoling named Agent 8, the protagonist of Splatoon 2: Octo Expansion (2018), who finds themselves trapped in the Memverse, a virtual reality created by Marina of the duo Off the Hook. Accompanied by a drone version of Marina's co-star Pearl, Agent 8 uncovers Order, a rogue artificial intelligence who threatens to abduct souls from the outside world to remove their free will and instigate a world of pure orderliness. With the assistance of Marina, Pearl, and another victim named Acht, Agent 8 journeys up a thirty-floor spire to destroy Order.

Development began shortly after the release of Splatoon 3 in 2022. The DLC's art direction was inspired the concept of "order" to contrast Splatoon 3's emphasis on "chaos", and intended to envoke themes surrounding nostalgia and memories. The team sought to reinvent the traditional structure of Splatoon single-player campaigns by creating a distinctly replayable experience.

Side Order was released as the second wave of the "Splatoon 3 Expansion Pass" on February 22, 2024. It received favorable reviews from critics, with praise given to its art direction and integration of Splatoon's gameplay mechanics into the roguelite genre. Criticism was directed towards a perceived lack of diversity in levels over time.

== Gameplay ==
An in-game screenshot of the Floor Selection menu. The player may choose one of the three scenarios offered which have varying difficulties and color chip rewards.

Side Order is a downloadable content (DLC) single-player campaign for Splatoon 3. As with its parent title, Side Order is a third-person shooter that centers on the usage of ink as both ammunition and a liquid that can be submerged and swum through. Unlike previous single-player campaigns, Side Order is also a roguelite, meaning the player traverses through a randomized gauntlet of levels, during which they can obtain chips that can upgrade abilities. losing all lives prompts a reset to the beginning. The player controls an Octoling, a humanoid octopus, named Agent 8, who previously starred in Splatoon 2: Octo Expansion (2018). They can choose one of twelve weapon loadouts, known as Palettes, to use for each attempt. Chips are put into the palettes which locks in the ability. Agent 8 is accompanied by Pearl and Marina of the pop music duo Off the Hook as well as Acht, another character who appeared in Octo Expansion. Pearl in particular transforms into a drone that aides in combat against foes and allows for airborne gliding by the player.

The player navigates through a vertical structure known as the Spire of Order, which consists of 10 levels—known as floors—during the tutorial and expands to 30 afterwards. The player accumulates the Membux currency as they progress. Upon entry, the player begins their attempt by selecting one of three scenarios, which range in difficulty from "easy" to "rigorous", for their next floor, featuring a specific objective. There are five objectives total, all of which contain enemies known as Jelletons. These objectives include destroying portals from which Jelletons spawn, defeating Jelletons that flee from the player, guiding a mobile tower to a designated goal, pushing a ball to an end checkpoint, and Splat Zones, a king of the hill-style mode from Splatoon 3's multiplayer. Each objective scenario equips the player with one or two "color chips" for its duration. Color chips are perks attached to the player's Palette that strengthen particular gameplay mechanics such as player movement or weapon strength. A vending machine floor that sells abilities for Membux can occasionally be offered as a scenario.

In the selection menu, "bonus" or "danger" modifiers can be randomly attached to floor scenarios. Bonus floors come in two forms: they either assign a secondary and optional objective whose completion awards additional Membux, or enhance the player's Pallete for that floor alone. Danger floors add a debilitating side effect, such as covering the ground with opponent ink and inducing a blackout.

Mandatory boss battles occur every 10 floors. Floor 30 is the final floor where the player battles Order, a rogue virtual entity that acts as the expansion's final boss, while floors 10 and 20 can house one of three possible bosses. These smaller bosses are the Pinging Marciale, a rolling enemy whose armor gradually sheds; the Asynchronous Rondo, a tower-like enemy; and the Parallel Canon, a group of characters similar in appearance to the player. Completing boss floors also awards keys that are later used to open the compartments of a locker. Said compartments contain new Palletes for Agent 8 to equip, as well as in-universe diaries written by Marina that offer narrative background on various elements of Splatoon's world.

If the player loses all of their lives during an attempt, they are sent to the base of the Spire, upon which their then-collected color chips and Membux are converted into a persistent currency called Prlz. (Note: Pronounced "pearls") This currency can be invested outside the Spire into toggleable upgrades, called Hacks, that affect future attempts, such as increasing the damage output of weapons or the number of lives the player can have at once.

== Synopsis ==
=== Setting ===
The logo of the Kamabo Corporation, as seen in Splatoon 2: Octo Expansion

The Splatoon series takes place 12,000 years into the far future on a post-apocalyptic Earth following the extinction of humans and virtually all other mammal life, implied to be the result of rampant climate change. After this cataclysm, the planet is repopulated with evolved marine animals who become terrestrial creatures and in the present day reside in the regions of Inkadia and the Splatlands. Such creatures include the Inklings and Octolings, humanoid squids and octopuses respectively, whom players take control of. The hub worlds of Splatoon and Splatoon 2, Inkopolis Plaza and Inkopolis Square respectively, are located in Inkadia within the greater city of Inkopolis, while the hub world of Splatoon 3, the city of Splatsville, is situated in the Splatlands. By the events of Side Order, railways are established between these locations, permitting back-and-forth travel by train. The cities hold regular news broadcasts hosted by resident idol groups, those being, as of Splatoon 3, Pearl and Marina of Off the Hook for Inkopolis and Shiver, Frye, and Big Man of Deep Cut for Splatsville.

During the events of Splatoon 2: Octo Expansion, Pearl and Marina remotely assisted Agent 8 in escaping the Deepsea Metro, a network of subterranean rapid transit facilities owned by the Kamabo Corporation, ran by Commander Tartar. Kamabo's primary activities consisted of kidnapping Octarians, the overarching group of which Octolings are a part, and subjecting them to rigorous experimental tests. The best-performing test subjects would be killed, with their bodies blended into a fluorescent green paste. This paste, when doused onto other creatures, caused them to lose their memories and free will, ultimately becoming subservient to Kamabo in an act known as "sanitization". Kamabo's ultimate goal was to create an apex species, loyal to the company's ideals, in an attempt to instigate a world of pure harmony and non-conflict. Prior to Octo Expansion, Acht, a friend of Marina when the two served in the Octarian military, willingly partook in sanitization to devote themselves solely to music production under the pseudonym Dedf1sh.

=== Plot ===
A news report from Deep Cut details strange phenomena occurring in Inkopolis Square, with some inhabitants appearing to stand mindlessly. They then announce a train line opening between Splatsville and Inkopolis Square. While on the train, the player's Splatoon 3 avatar falls asleep as a glitch effect takes over the screen, turning the train into an empty and bleak version of Inkopolis Square.

The game shifts control to Agent 8. (Note: Throughout Side Order, Agent 8 is exclusively addressed as "Eight" by other characters.) They awaken in a virtual world called the Memverse, where they are found by a drone version of Pearl. Agent 8 and Pearl enter the Spire of Order to find Marina, who has vanished. Within the Spire's elevator, they meet Acht, a formerly sanitized Octoling and a childhood friend of Marina, who teaches them how to combat Jelletons, x-ray fish-like enemies. Upon reaching floor 10, they find Marina held captive and controlled by Order, an artificial intelligence formed out of wishes for an orderly world by people who have interacted with the Memverse.

After freeing Marina, Order ejects the group and significantly increases the height of the Spire and the difficulty of its challenges. Pearl is reverted to her bodily form, and can now willingly switch into a drone. Marina explains to Agent 8, Pearl, and Acht that she originally created the Memverse to recover the memories of sanitized Octolings taken prisoner by the Kamabo Corporation. Order then hijacked the Memverse to instigate a reality of "perfect order" by exploiting a network vulnerability within people's cellphones in the outside world to lure them within and erase their free will via "grayscaling", which causes them to enter a mindless state in the real world. The group comes across a locker containing twelve Palettes that Agent 8 can equip to ascend the Spire. Each Palette corresponds to the memories of someone from the real world, but contain errors—Marina explains that reaching the top of the Spire will allow the chosen Palette to be reconfigured, and completing boss fights with a new Palette awards keys, allowing Agent 8 to unlock more Palettes.

The group reaches the top of the Spire to challenge Order, who transforms into a gargantuan octopus form. Nearing defeat, Order attempts to grayscale all of the real world's inhabitants, but the group survives the attack and defeats it using Pearl's "Color Wail" weapon. Order is reduced to an infantile form known as Smollusk and stripped of its influence over the outside world; the group leaves the Memverse and returns to the real world. The player's Splatoon 3 avatar then awakens upon arriving at Inkopolis Square. Deep Cut reports that most of the Inklings and Octolings have regained their energy and the Square has largely returned to normal, though a select few still appear to stand idly.

Upon returning to the Memverse, Agent 8 is tasked by Marina with ascending through the Spire and defeating Smollusk, who remains at the top floor, with each of the twelve Palettes, stating that it is necessary to reconfigure all of them to avoid complications with each Palette's real-world counterpart. Upon defeating Smollusk with the final Palette, it admits that it is worried about being left alone forever now that the group's mission is complete. Marina states that it will still be necessary for the sanitized Octolings to reach the top of the Spire as part of their recovery, and that Agent 8 can come visit the Spire whenever they want, promising that Smollusk will never be left alone for long.

== Development and release ==
Concept artwork depicting a Jelleton enemy. The Jelletons were designed as skeletal-fish-like creatures because developers thought bones were an apt motif for Side Order's pale environments.

Side Order's development began sometime after the release of Splatoon 3 on 9 September 2022, with Kenji Matsumodo and Seita Inoue as directors, Toshiyuki Sudo as lead musician, and Inoue as head artist. The team conceptualized a world inspired by the aesthetic of order to diverge from Splatoon 3's emphasis on chaos; Splatoon 3's chaotic art direction was chosen due to Team Chaos' victory in Splatoon 2's final Splatfest, "Chaos vs. Order". Inoue explained in an interview with Famitsu that the team thought it "would be interesting to make a world where [Team] Order triumphed" instead. In-game environments were deliberately inspired by virtual reality simulations to stress that Side Order's gameplay would differ from that of previous Splatoon entries. Developers settled on the theme of ascending a tall structure partly to contrast the subterranean setting of Octo Expansion. The development team also felt the tower locale lent itself to repetitive challenges, a gameplay framework decided early on. Including a distinctly replayable game mode was conceived to offer players a novel way of engaging with Splatoon, as the levels of previous installments' single-player campaigns were mostly linear and derivative of each other.

The overall direction of Side Order's landscapes and sound design was guided by "a mixture of tenderness, sadness, and [...] nostalgic memories". The in-universe music group to whom Side Order's soundtrack is attributed is named "Free Association" ("Mnemonic Clouds" in Japanese) as an allusion to these themes of memory. While the music is usually ambient, the background tracks of levels in the Spire become more distorted as the player nears the top, done to elicit a gradual feeling of "excessive order".

The Jelletons were designed as skeletal fish because the team thought bones were a logical motif for the expansion's off-white environments. The team deliberated on what the player's introductory guide would be, first considering an artificial intelligence like that of Splatoon 3's base single-player. Acht was ultimately chosen because developers thought the alternative would feel uninspired. Developers wished for players to be accompanied by a persistent, drone-like companion that could allow for mid-air gliding. Pearl, whose appearance in the story had already been established, was judged as working well for this role. Each boss fight is visually based on a marine-related concept: the Pinging Marciale is derived from sea urchins, the Asynchronous Rondo is inspired by looping conveyor belt sushi, and the Parallel Canon are commanded by a replica of Agent 4, the Inkling protagonist of Splatoon 2's base single-player campaign.

=== Release ===
In a Nintendo Direct online presentation on 8 February 2023, Nintendo announced the paid "Splatoon 3 Expansion Pass," featuring two waves of content. Wave 1, which includes Inkopolis Plaza, the hub world from the first game in the series, would release later that month on 28 February, while Wave 2, Side Order, was set to debut at a later date. Side Order would ultimately release on 22 February 2024. An art book consisting of concept illustrations from Side Order's development, titled BancalaWalker, and a CD release of the expansion's soundtrack, titled Ordertune, were jointly announced on 10 September 2024. Both were released in Japan by Kadokawa on 11 December.

== Reception ==
Reception

Aggregate scores
Aggregator	Score
Metacritic	78/100
OpenCritic	83% recommend

Review scores
Publication	Score
IGN	8/10
Nintendo Life	8/10
Nintendo World Report	7.5/10
PCMag	4/5
TouchArcade	4.5/5
IGN Japan	7/10

Side Order received "generally favorable" reviews according to the review aggregator website Metacritic. Fellow aggregator OpenCritic gave the expansion a "strong" approval rating, being recommended by approximately 83% of critics.

The expansion's artistic presentation was praised by critics. Reviewing for IGN Japan, Tea Can lauded its usage of glitch-like special effects and monochromatic color palettes as divergent from Splatoon's typical art direction. Jordan Minor of PCMag concurred, describing Side Order as like "an anime set inside an evil Apple Store". Alex Olney of Nintendo Life appreciated the visual contrast between the expansion's white stage backgrounds and the "void-like black ink" exuded by Jelletons, while Logan Plant of IGN praised the Jelletons themselves as aesthetically intimidating. Bree of Checkpoint Gaming appreciated its atmospheric audio design and soundtrack similar to electronic music. Press Start's Harry Kalogirou enjoyed Side Order's plot, finding that the optional diaries written by Marina added "supplemental worldbuilding" to the Splatoon universe. Shaun Musgrave of TouchArcade felt the expansion's story was better than previous entries' campaigns, and thought that longtime Splatoon fans would appreciate its small additions to the series' lore. Tea Can had conversely mixed opinions on the narrative, calling it straightforward and inferior to that of Octo Expansion. She additionally felt its thematic examinations of chaos versus order were underwhelming.

Side Order's core gameplay mechanics were commended. Logan Plant of IGN called Splatoon 3 a "perfect fit" for the roguelite genre, praising how Side Order combined Splatoon's fundamentals with the traditional roguelite formula. Kalogirou found the experience of crafting powerful color chip loadouts rewarding, and thought the Hacks system promoted long-term replayability. Kosuke Takenaka of Automaton found it compelling to constantly experiment with new color chip combinations, a view shared by Jenni Lada of Siliconera. Reviewing for 4Gamer.net, Okudos Kumada wrote positively on the chips themselves, finding that they allow for an engaging fusion of Splatoon's ink-based combat and the element of randomness typical of roguelites. Ozzie Meija of Shacknews concurred, praising Side Order overall as a refreshing take on the Splatoon series' gameplay, hoping that Nintendo would revisit the roguelite formula in a future installment.

Some reviewers criticized Side Order's levels as having too little variation. Tea Can agreed on a lack of diversity in stage design, calling this quality disappointing and uncharacteristic of a roguelite. Olney similarly took issue with the limited number of boss scenarios accessible to the player each run at floors 10 and 20. Nintendo World Report's Justin Berube critiqued the expansion's lack of variety in both levels and bosses as causing it "to go a bit stale before it should". Plant opined that the expansion's pacing felt slow at times, and that it thus lacked "that 'just one more run' feeling the best roguelites nail".
