= Splatoon 2: Octo Expansion =

2018 video game expansion pack

- Nintendo eShop artwork, featuring Cap'n Cuttlefish (left) and Agent 8 (right)
- Developer: Nintendo EPD
- Publisher: Nintendo
- Directors: Yusuke Amano; Seita Inoue; Shintaro Sato
- Producer: Hisashi Nogami
- Composers: Toru Minegishi; Ryo Nagamatsu
- Series: Splatoon
- Platform: Nintendo Switch
- Release: June 13, 2018
- Genre: Third-person shooter
- Mode: Single-player

Splatoon 2: Octo Expansion (Note: Japanese: スプラトゥーン2 オクト・エキスパンション, Hepburn: Supuratūn Tsū: Okuto Ekisupanshon) is a 2018 downloadable content (DLC) expansion pack for the single-player mode of Splatoon 2 (2017), a third-person shooter video game for the Nintendo Switch. Set in an underground rapid transit system named the Deepsea Metro, Octo Expansion follows an amnesiac Octoling, a humanoid octopus, nicknamed Agent 8. After becoming trapped in the Metro alongside former military general Cap'n Cuttlefish, Agent 8 journeys through testing facilities, at the direction of a talking Telephone, with the goal of escaping to the surface.

The development of Octo Expansion began shortly after the release of Splatoon 2 on July 21, 2017. Series producer Hisashi Nogami wanted to give players an opportunity to explore previously undeveloped aspects of Splatoon's world—especially those relating to the Octolings—through a story-driven, single-player adventure. The DLC's levels were designed to be more varied and challenging than those of Splatoon 2's regular story campaign. Octo Expansion's visual aesthetics took influence from the popular culture of eras such as the 1980s to elicit a mysterious atmosphere, while its dark, subterranean setting served to set itself apart from the series' colorful world.

Octo Expansion was released on June 13, 2018. It was met with positive reception for its level design, art direction, and story that reviewers said expanded upon the narrative foundations of earlier Splatoon games. Numerous critics deemed it superior to Splatoon 2's regular single-player mode. Many commentators would directly compare gameplay aspects of future Splatoon single-player experiences to Octo Expansion, particularly the base story campaign of Splatoon 3 (2022) and the spin-off title Splatoon Raiders (2026). Much of Octo Expansion's cast, including Agent 8, reappear in the single-player expansion for Splatoon 3, titled Side Order.

== Gameplay ==
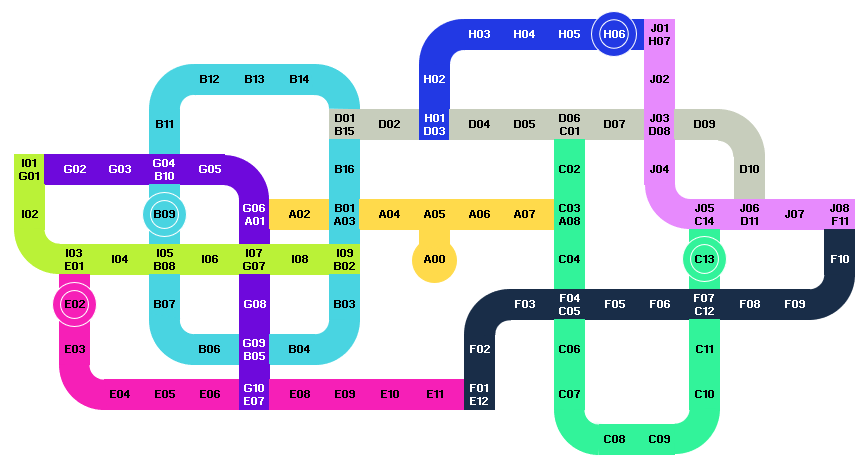
Map of the Deepsea Metro as seen in-game, featuring its 80 available levels across numerous metro lines

Octo Expansion is a downloadable content (DLC) single-player campaign for Splatoon 2 (2017). Octo Expansion retains core gameplay elements from its parent title, including the usage of ink as both ammunition and a liquid that players can submerge and swim through. The player controls an Octoling, a humanoid octopus, nicknamed Agent 8. Their (Note: Agent 8 can be either male or female, depending on the player's choice.) mission is to reach the surface by collecting four objects called "thangs" scattered across various testing chambers with differing objectives. There are a total of 80 challenges offered, which includes occasional bosses, but clearing them all is not required to progress the main story.

Within the interconnecting hub world, the player can instantaneously travel to numerous stations throughout the Deepsea Metro, which are divided between distinct metro lines. Each station houses a particular challenge and has a mandatory entry fee, which must be paid using the limited CQ Points currency. These entry fees vary across the Metro, ranging from 100 to 3,000 points. If the trial's objective is successfully completed, the player is awarded additional CQ Points. Objectives range from shooting boxes to imitate a desired object, guiding a giant 8-ball to a marked goal, shooting a set number of moving targets, and others. Each level features combat encounters with "sanitized" versions of the Octarian enemies from Splatoon 2's single-player.

Before starting a level, players are offered a predetermined selection of weapons normally found in Splatoon 2's multiplayer, including powerful armaments named special weapons that last for an infinite duration. If the player loses all of their lives, they can reattempt the challenge, provided they have sufficient funds. If they fail more than twice, they are given the option to skip the level entirely. If the player's CQ Points balance depletes below zero by repeatedly failing objectives, they are loaned back a small amount of points to allow further play. Each level is accessed in the hub world through a virtual subway map, displayed through the in-game CQ-80 device.

Upon finishing levels, players are given "mem cakes", miniature collectibles that visually resemble a particular aspect from Splatoon's world. Each mem cake is attached to a haiku-structured poem written from the perspective of Agent 8 that centers on the mem cake's subject. The mem cakes can also be exchanged for cosmetic gear items equippable in Splatoon 2's multiplayer. If the player skips a level, its associated mem cake is withheld until said level is cleared legitimately. Collecting every mem cake by clearing each of the 80 available courses unlocks an optional boss fight. Similarly to the mem cakes, players are also gradually given access to in-universe chat logs written by characters Pearl, Marina, and Cuttlefish that divulge background information on elements of Splatoon's overarching narrative. Both the mem cake poems and chat logs are viewable through the CQ-80. Once players complete the expansion's story, they are awarded the option to compete in multiplayer matches as an Octoling alongside Inklings.

== Synopsis ==
=== Setting ===
The logo of the Kamabo Corporation, as seen in Octo Expansion

The Splatoon series takes place 12,000 years into the far future on a post-apocalyptic Earth following the extinction of humans and virtually all other mammal life, implied to be the result of rampant climate change. After this, the planet is repopulated with evolved, terrestrial marine animals who in the present day reside in the regions of Inkadia and the Splatlands. Such creatures include the Inklings and Octolings, humanoid squids and octopuses respectively, whom players take control of. When a flooding event struck the planet, the two groups became embroiled in military conflict in competition for land. This conflict became known as the Great Turf War. The Inklings, led by general Cap'n Cuttlefish, achieved victory and reclaimed all land on the surface, while the Octarians, the overarching group of which Octolings are a part, were forced underground. The single-player campaign of the first Splatoon (2015) sees Cuttlefish enlist an Inkling dubbed Agent 3, the player character, to invade Octarian territory to recover the stolen Great Zapfish, the power source of the city of Inkopolis located in Inkadia. Within Inkopolis is the hub world of Splatoon 2 (2017), Inkopolis Square. Inkopolis holds regular news broadcasts hosted by a resident idol group; as of Splatoon 2, said group is Pearl and Marina of Off the Hook. The plot of Octo Expansion occurs roughly around the same time as the events of Splatoon 2's base single-player mode.

The Deepsea Metro is a network of subterranean rapid transit facilities owned by the Kamabo Corporation, ran by Commander Tartar. Kamabo's primary activities consist of kidnapping Octarians and subjecting them to rigorous experimental tests. The best-performing test subjects would be killed, with their bodies blended into a fluorescent green paste. This paste, when doused onto other creatures, causes them to lose their memories and free will, ultimately becoming subservient to Kamabo in an act known as "sanitization". Kamabo's ultimate goal is to create an apex species, loyal to the company's ideals, in an attempt to instigate a world of pure harmony and non-conflict.

=== Plot ===
Under mysterious circumstances, an Octoling becomes confined in an underground subway facility named the Deepsea Metro. They are awoken by former military general Cap'n Cuttlefish, who found himself trapped while on patrol with Agent 3. With the Octoling having no recollection of their identity, Cuttlefish decides to assist them in reaching the surface. While exploring the Metro, the duo meet a talking Telephone, who identifies the Octoling as "Applicant 10,008". The title's verbosity prompts Cuttlefish to give them the moniker "Agent 8" instead.

The Telephone relays that to reach "the promised land", Agent 8 must traverse through the subway to collect four objects known as "thangs" scattered across various testing chambers. Agent 8 is given remote assistance via radio by Pearl and Marina of the pop band Off the Hook. Agent 8 clears the challenges and collects all four thangs, which the Telephone combines into a large blender. The Telephone attempts to kill Agent 8 and Cuttlefish by tricking them into entering it. Heeding a distress signal sent by Marina, Agent 3 breaches the facility, rescues the duo, and incapacitates the Telephone. Agent 8 climbs through the depths of the facility towards the surface, while Cuttlefish stays behind to keep watch over Agent 3, who was knocked unconscious during their attack. Just as Agent 8 is about to reach the exit, they are confronted by Agent 3, who was brainwashed by the Telephone with the use of a turquoise-colored, gelatinous ooze; Agent 3 also kidnapped Cuttlefish. Agent 8 defeats them in battle, freeing them from their mind control and rescuing Cuttlefish.

After reaching the surface, the trio is retrieved by Pearl and Marina. Upon their rescue, the facility itself begins to rise from the ocean, revealed to be a gargantuan statue of a human. From within the statue, the mangled—but still functional—Telephone formally introduces itself as Commander Tartar, an artificial intelligence constructed by a human scientist before mankind's extinction millennia prior. Initially programmed to encode and pass the knowledge of humanity onto the next sentient race, Tartar became personally disgusted with the cultures of the Inklings and Octolings. Deeming them unworthy of its wisdom, it reveals its new objective: to eradicate all present life and create a new apex species using a genetic ooze made from its past test subjects. As it prepares to discharge a solar-powered cannon from the mouth of the statue to destroy Inkopolis, Marina devises a plan to stop it from charging by having Agent 8 cover the statue in ink. The plan is successful, but the statue fires anyway with its reserve energy. As a last resort, Pearl uses her voice-powered Princess Cannon weapon to counter the laser, destroying both the statue and Tartar. With the threat averted, the group returns to Inkopolis Square.

== Development and release ==
Concept art of Agent 8 in a vaporwave-style location. The environments of Octo Expansion were designed to appear dated to contrast with the established art styles of previous Splatoon installments.

Octo Expansion's conceptualization began shortly after the release of Splatoon 2 on July 21, 2017. Octolings, which had previously assumed the role of non-player enemies in the series' story campaigns, were considered to be made playable avatars since the original Splatoon and the beginning of Splatoon 2's development. Despite fan interest in the concept of playable Octolings, some players having modded Splatoon to include them, their addition to Splatoon 2 was tentatively rejected as developers felt it would be jarring for Octolings to feature in a non-antagonistic role without explanation. Producer Hisashi Nogami wanted to produce the expansion in part to allow players to explore deeper into the series' world, deciding that a dedicated single-player experience was the best manner of accomplishing this.

While the Octolings were originally depicted as foils to the Inklings, Nogami wanted to stress that neither group is meant to be wholly good nor bad, and that their conflicts are merely the result of two distinct societies clashing with one another. The playable Octolings themselves were designed to visually contrast the Inklings by having a rounder appearance and a more serious disposition. The environment of a subway station was chosen to create a darker setting divergent from the series' otherwise colorful art style. As with previous Splatoon games, Nogami also wanted Octo Expansion's setting to feel genuine and dynamic. He explained that occasionally eliciting darker themes to offset the cheerfulness was done to make Splatoon's world better reflect reality in that "... you don't live every single day with the same attitude. You're not smiling and laughing every day of your life." The designers wanted players to feel out of place in the Deepsea Metro by taking regular inspiration from the cultures of "forgotten generation[s]", like those of the 1980s, that some players would be unfamiliar with, serving as an analogy for Agent 8's memory loss.

The level design was intended to vary wildly, and featured cut content from the base Splatoon 2 release. There were concepts for around 150 levels, but only 80 made it into the full game. The expansion's final boss, which stemmed from ideas that director Yusuke Amano had wanted to implement since the first Splatoon, was outlined in a 30-page manga illustrated by art director Seita Inoue. The developers added the CQ Point system as a way to create tension and give players more agency in how they complete levels. It also served as a check-and-balance system for the expansion's repetitive gameplay. Some of the game's levels were designed by members of the development team for The Legend of Zelda: Breath of the Wild (2017), particularly those that helped create the latter title's shrine puzzles.

Toru Minegishi headed development of the expansion's soundtrack. Octo Expansion's songs were originally intended to be nebulous background music with a heightened focus on ambient sound. Minegishi later changed his perspective, finding that including more rhythmic pieces were essential to convince players to "want to move forward". The soundtrack was written towards a wide range of tempos and styles to reflect the playstyles required of the diverse mission types in the Deepsea Metro. The songs were enjoyed by Inoue to such a degree that he created a DJ character named Dedf1sh to act as their in-universe creator; he hoped Dedf1sh's inclusion would increase fan interest in the songs. Only the music that plays during missions is credited to Dedf1sh; Minegishi believed that giving the tracks unrelated to the missions a different atmosphere would allow Dedf1sh's music to stand out even more. In composing Off the Hook's new music, the team sought to bring out a new side of the group. One such Off the Hook song, "Nasty Majesty", was based on the electronic dance music (EDM) genre with the intent of creating "a new image" for Off the Hook while still retaining their trademark "Western music feel".

=== Release ===
Octo Expansion was announced in a Nintendo Direct broadcast on March 8, 2018. The expansion was made available to pre-order shortly after its announcement, with exclusive in-game clothing items available for doing so. At the end of the Splatoon 2 World Championships held during E3 2018 on June 12, Nogami revealed that Octo Expansion was set to release the day after, on June 13. An CD release featuring music from Octo Expanson's soundtrack among other Splatoon 2 tracks, titled Octotune, was released on July 18. An Amiibo set featuring the Octoling Girl, Boy, and Octopus was released on December 7. An art book consisting mostly of concept illustrations from Octo Expansion's development, titled Inkopolis Walker, was published exclusively in Japan on December 28. A physical version of Splatoon 2 with the DLC included was made available on October 8, 2021, also solely in Japan. On April 22, 2022, Octo Expansion was added as a complimentary benefit for the "Nintendo Switch Online + Expansion Pack".

== Reception and legacy ==
Reception

Aggregate scores
Aggregator	Score
Metacritic	82/100 (Note: Based on 34 critic reviews)
OpenCritic	82% recommend (Note: Based on 30 critic reviews)

Review scores
Publication	Score
Destructoid	7/10
Game Informer	8.5/10
IGN	8.8/10
Nintendo Life	9/10
Nintendo World Report	9/10
Pocket Gamer	4/5

Octo Expansion received "generally favorable" reviews according to the review aggregator website Metacritic. Fellow aggregator OpenCritic gave the DLC a "strong" rating, being recommended by 82% of critics. Many critics found Octo Expansion to be of higher quality than Splatoon 2's base single-player campaign. (Note: Attributed to multiple sources:)

The expansion's levels were mostly praised for their mechanical creativity, as well as their high difficulty. IGN reviewer Brendan Graeber praised the diversity of Octo Expansion's trials, lauding their inventive use of the Splatoon series' ink-based mechanics. Similarly, Kallie Plagge of GameSpot complimented the expansion's experimentation with restricting the player to choosing a select few weapons per level. While she called the levels suitable practice for Splatoon 2's online modes, she acknowledged they could become exceedingly difficult for those unaccustomed to said weapons. The CQ Points system, which critics described as allowing less-skilled players to skip especially challenging levels, was generally praised, though Tomas Barry of Cubed3 felt it became needlessly complex at times. Writing for IGN Japan, Takuya Watanabe critiqued the expansion as having little replay value, but wrote positively of the levels' short length and their adjustable difficuly. Destructoid 's Chris Carter stated that while some levels felt rewarding to clear, others were tedious, personally deeming the difficulty distribution across the Metro inconsistent.

Reviewers commended the expansion's art direction. Alex Olney of Nintendo Life applauded Octo Expansion's visuals as unique and full of intricate details, additionally lauding the soundtrack. He responded positively to the in-game cutscenes, which he believed heightened the characters' complex personalities. Conversely, Chris Carter critiqued the expansion's level environments little more than a re-skin of those from Splatoon 2's base single-player. Caty McCarthy of VG427 described the Deepsea Metro itself as creepy, while Brian Shea of Game Informer and Natalie Clayton of GamesRadar+ compared its test chambers to those of the puzzle-platform video game Portal (2007). Game Watch wrote highly of the game's emphasis on nostalgia, feeling that Octo Expansion's recurring allusions to bygone fads contrasted well with Splatoon's artistic fixation on trendiness. In an analysis written for Denfamincogamer, Shiba Triangle commented on Octo Expansion's references to vaporwave and early Internet culture, praising the game for exploring themes of reverence for the past and embracing of modernity.

Octo Expansion's narrative was warmly received. Game Watch and McCarthy appreciated the expansion's story crumbs, such as the optional chat logs, that added to the overarching story of Splatoon's world, principally in relation to the Octolings. Alana Hagues of Nintendo Life opined that Octo Expansion "furthers the story of the Inklings' and Octolings' world effortlessly and beautifully", lauding it overall as "a masterclass in how to do DLC right". The game's escape climax, including the final boss, was especially acclaimed. Takuya Watanabe lauded the background music of the finale as establishing an emotional atmosphere, and its gameplay sequences as exhilerating. Kotaku's Ben Bertoli commented on what he felt were the DLC's more overtly disturbing plot elements compared to earlier Splatoon titles; he characterized Commander Tartar as "genocidal" and deserving of "a spot near the top of gaming's most hardcore villains."

=== Legacy ===
Splatoon 2's sequel, Splatoon 3 (2022), marks the first instance in the series where players are given the choice to be an Octoling immediately upon starting the game. The level design and overall aesthetics of Splatoon 3's single-player campaign, Return of the Mammalians, were noted by reviewers as being reminiscent of Octo Expansion. Certain levels and game design choices in the spin-off title Splatoon Raiders (2026) also elicited comparisons to those of Octo Expansion from critics. Splatoon 3's own paid DLC, titled Side Order, follows a cast of returning characters who originally starred in Octo Expansion, including Pearl, Marina, Dedf1sh, and Agent 8, the lattermost of whom the player once again assumes control.
