= Pearl and Marina =

Fictional pop duo in the Splatoon series

- Splatoon characters
- Artwork of Pearl (left) and Marina (right)
- First appearance: Splatoon 2 (2017)
- Created by: Rina Honda
- Voiced by: Rina Itou (Pearl); Alice Peralta (Marina)

In-universe information
- Species: Inkling (Pearl); Octoling (Marina)

Pearl (Japanese: ヒメ, Hepburn: Hime) and Marina (Japanese: イイダ, Hepburn: Īda) are a duo of characters from the Splatoon video game series. They were first introduced in Splatoon 2 (2017) as members of a pop music act known as Off the Hook (Japanese: テンタクルズ, Hepburn: Tentakuruzu; lit. "Tentacles"), who perform a variety of songs in the game's hub world. The characters also regularly communicate information regarding stage availability to players of Splatoon 2 through an in-universe news broadcast. Pearl and Marina make appearances in the downloadable content (DLC) expansion packs Splatoon 2: Octo Expansion (2018) and Splatoon 3: Side Order (2024).

Marina, a prodigious weapons designer, attended elite military training for the underground Octarian society from an early age into adulthood. She deserted the army upon hearing the Squid Sisters' song "Calamari Inkantation" and met Pearl atop a secluded mountain on the surface. Pearl, upon hearing a work-in-progress demo of a song by Marina, immediately agreed to establish the band Off the Hook, relocating to Inkopolis to serve as resident idols.

Off the Hook was conceived by developers as having a stronger interpersonal bond than the Squid Sisters of Splatoon (2015). Voice actresses Rina Itou and Alice portrayed Pearl and Marina respectively; Itou and Alice both felt adequately conveying the game's fictional "squid language" was the most challenging aspect of their performance. The duo would go on to appear in other media; they performed in several real-world virtual concerts and served as a collectible item in Super Smash Bros. Ultimate (2018).

Pearl and Marina have together received a generally positive reception for their chemistry and divergent personalities. Pearl's arrogant attitude garnered mixed reception initially from fans and critics but saw reappraisal over time. Marina was well-perceived for her cheery disposition; commentators deemed her a fan-favorite, especially during the game's virtual Splatfests.

== Conception ==
Pearl and Marina were created for the video game Splatoon 2 by Nintendo artist Rina Honda. The duo comprise the pop music group Off the Hook, serving as resident idols of Inkopolis, Splatoon 2's hub world, who perform live songs and host the city's news broadcasts. Pearl is an Inkling, a squid-like species, while Marina is an Octoling, an octopus-like species. In an interview with Famitsu, series producer Hisashi Nogami described the duo as having a "stronger sense of unity" than the previous game's Squid Sisters, being musicians whose talents only shine when working together.

Pearl and Marina are portrayed by voice actresses Rina Itou and Alice Peralta, respectively. When auditioning for the roles, neither actress was told what game they were recording for, and their only reference was a provided illustration of the duo. Itou recalled being aware of the first Splatoon at the time, and assumed the characters were from a sequel; Peralta was not as familiar with the game. During recording sessions for Octo Expansion, the two actresses thought many of the songs assigned to them were more difficult to sing compared to earlier tracks featured in Splatoon 2. Itou in particular was given abstract direction for Pearl's rap-inspired vocal delivery, one example being to "act like a spoiled child." Both Itou and Peralta felt that adequately portraying the fictional "squid language" used in Splatoon was the most challenging aspect of their performances.

== Appearances ==
=== Splatoon series ===
Marina, characterized by developers as reserved and technologically proficient, was born into the subterranean Octarian civilization. An honor student, she attended elite military training from an early age and designed weapons for use by the Octarian army, attaining celebrity status among her peers by adulthood. During this time she became close friends with fellow student Acht. Upon hearing the Squid Sisters' song "Calamari Inkantation", Marina deserted the army and escaped to the surface. She would meet musician Pearl, the daughter of a wealthy family, while the latter was practicing her deafening vocals on a secluded mountain. Upon listening to Marina's demo of a song titled "Ebb & Flow", Pearl immediately agreed to join her in a musical act, leading to the formation of Off the Hook and the duo relocating to Inkopolis.

==== Splatoon 2 (2017) ====
Pearl and Marina appear in Splatoon 2, serving as the idols of the Inkopolis News broadcast that introduces competitive stage rotations, replacing Callie and Marie from the first game. During in-game Splatfests, competitive events centering on a questionnaire-like prompt, Pearl and Marina each back one of the two opposing teams and perform together in the hub world. For Splatoon 2's final Splatfest "Chaos vs. Order", Pearl represented Team Chaos and Marina represented Team Order, with Team Chaos ultimately claiming victory.

Pearl and Marina appear in the paid downloadable content (DLC) expansion Octo Expansion, where they communicate with the player-character Agent 8, who is trapped within a deep sea metro system littered with challenges. If Agent 8 fails a challenge at least twice, Marina will offer to rewire the metro's security system into believing Agent 8 has completed the challenge's objective, effectively skipping it. Agent 8 is gradually given access to digital chat logs between Pearl, Marina, and returning character Cap'n Cuttlefish that divulge background information regarding Splatoon's greater narrative. Pearl and Marina later aid Agent 8 in combating the final boss Commander Tartar, who seeks to destroy their world.

==== Splatoon 3 (2022) ====
The duo initially appears in Splatoon 3 as members of a new musical unit known as Damp Socks feat. Off the Hook, with Pearl and Marina providing vocals for the band's music. During this time, the duo undertook a round-the-world concert tour. Off the Hook would return to co-create a song titled "Suffer No Fools" with Shiver and Frye of rival group Deep Cut.

Splatoon 3's DLC expansion, titled Side Order, features Pearl and Marina as protagonists. The expansion follows Agent 8, whom the player once more assumes control, as they are forcefully dragged into a virtual world called the Memverse alongside Pearl, who takes the form of a drone that assists Agent 8 in combat; Marina, the creator of this virtual world, has gone missing. After rescuing Marina, the trio allies with Acht, also taken prisoner in the Memverse, and set out to defeat Order, a rogue artificial intelligence who hijacked this world from Marina and is responsible for the group's predicament. Marina can assist Agent 8 on their journey by offering toggleable upgrades called "Hacks" that augment various gameplay mechanics in exchange for currency.

The "Grand Festival" Splatfest, "Past vs. Present vs. Future", saw each game's respective idol groups support one of the three teams, Off the Hook endorsing Team Present. Team Past, backed by the Squid Sisters, won the overall festival, with Team Present placing second.

=== In other media ===
Pearl and Marina have performed in virtual concerts, their songs played live and accompanied by choreographed dance sequences. Their first took place as part of the Splatoon European Championship. Additional virtual concerts were held at NicoNico Chokaigi 2018, where the duo debuted the theme song of Octo Expansion, "Nasty Majesty", and at Niconico Tokaigi 2019.

Outside of the Splatoon series, Off the Hook jointly appeared in Super Smash Bros. Ultimate as a collectible Spirit.

==== Merchandise ====
A two-pack Amiibo set was released on July 13, 2018, featuring Pearl and Marina. Another set of Amiibo, depicting them in their Splatoon 3 outfits, was released on September 5, 2024. Scanning either Amiibo figure allows the player to obtain exclusive cosmetics on theme with their respective character. Pearl and Marina received Sanrio-based plush toys of themselves. Posable action figures of the two were released by Good Smile Company in 2021.

== Reception ==
Pearl and Marina quickly became popular among players upon their reveal, receiving a sizeable number of fan works based on them. Polygon writer Allegra Frank and Destructoid writer Chris Moyse characterized Pearl gremlin-like, which caused her to be more polarizing online than Marina, the latter of whom Frank said was "categorically beloved". Frank suggested that this divisiveness was a consequence of Marina's fans' inclination to "pump [her] up" as well as Pearl's undesirable attitude. She observed that, over time, Pearl had nevertheless grown in popularity, due in part to a rise in fan art of her. Kotaku writer Heather Alexandra felt that Marina was "ruining" Splatfests for them due to Alexandra's propensity to pick a team not based on what they preferred, but rather on what team Marina represented. Electronic Gaming Monthly staff called Marina "EGM's official queen," proclaiming they would win every Splatfest for her.

Digital Trends' Gabe Gurwin attributed the duo's positive reception to Marina's "cheery personality" and Pearl's "gangsta-rap chops." Paste Magazine's Holly Green felt that Marina was an overall superior character to Pearl due to the latter's eagerness and arrogance, but opined that an "effective frontwoman" required those traits. Chris Moyse disagreed with earlier, negative assessments of Pearl, calling her "Queen of the World." Despite her love for Callie and Marie, Mollie L. Patterson of Electronic Gaming Monthly grew to prefer Pearl and Marina, later coming to appreciate Pearl as much as Marina. She also praised the duo's songs and chemistry. The precise relationship between Pearl and Marina, whether romantic or platonic, has been subject to debate. Patricia Hernandez felt that the dialogue in the final Splatfest of Splatoon 2 was leaning towards a romantic relationship but that it was vague enough to allow for either interpretation.

Destructoid writer Jonathan Holmes praised Marina as being a good character for people of color to see themselves in, as well as the first leading female Nintendo character of color. He also commended her design for straying from traditional stereotypes associated with characters of color such as white hair. The outfits worn by Pearl and Marina in Octo Expansion were speculated to be in reference to rappers The Notorious B.I.G. and Tupac Shakur. When asked for clarification, Nogami chose to be mum on the issue, feeling that answering the question would take away from the mystery.
