= Toru Minegishi =

Japanese composer (born 1975)

- 峰岸透
- Born: 1975 (age 50–51); Shibukawa, Gunma, Japan
- Education: Sophia University
- Occupations: Composer; sound designer
- Employer: Nintendo (1998–present)
- Musical career
- Genres: Video game music; rock; symphonic; jazz; electronic; folk; ambient
- Instruments: Keyboard; guitar; drums; melodica

Toru Minegishi (峰岸透, Minegishi Tōru; born 1975) is a Japanese video game composer known for his work on Nintendo games, most notably in The Legend of Zelda and Splatoon series. He was raised in a musical family and developed an interest in video games and their music from an early age. Minegishi did not receive any special education, but he gained experience as a musician during his school and college years.

== Biography ==
=== Early life ===
Minegishi grew up in a musical family; his parents were especially fond of Latin and tango music. He became interested in video games at the age of ten after he saw a commercial for The Legend of Zelda. As he kept his promise of improving his performance in swimming school, his parents gave him a Family Computer Disk System with The Legend of Zelda as a gift. One year later, he listened to Modest Mussorgsky's Pictures at an Exhibition for the first time, which is a suite of ten movements based on paintings by Viktor Hartmann. The suite's composition technique, which focused on matching music to visuals, had a big influence on Minegishi, and furthered his interest in video game music. Unlike other composers and professional musicians, he received no special musical education, and took no piano lessons when he was young; instead, Minegishi became interested in music by himself. He was percussionist of a school band in junior high, and later played drums in a band he had formed with his friends at college.

=== Career ===
Minegishi kept pursuing his dream of becoming a video game sound designer and applied at Nintendo. After he had passed a composition examination and a written music test, he obtained a job at the sound group of the Entertainment Analysis and Development (EAD) division. Minegishi often listens to music at home to make himself familiar with a variety of musical styles. He prefers to create melodies in his head, but composes on the keyboard and the guitar as well. The startup sound for the GameCube game console is one of the musical pieces he had conceived without instruments. Minegishi cites the development of sound effects for Super Mario Sunshine and the creation of over 50 compositions from different musical genres for Animal Crossing (K.K. Slider's songs) as some of his greatest learning experiences. He considers video game composer Koji Kondo, the manager of the EAD sound group, as big inspiration and a master of video game sound. Minegishi's first involvement in the Legend of Zelda series was with the composition of three battle themes for Majora's Mask. Later, he was assigned as the main composer for Twilight Princess. Several of his compositions for Twilight Princess were arranged for orchestra by Jonne Valtonen, and performed at the concert Symphonic Legends in September 2010.

== Works ==
Year	Title	Role	Ref.
1998	Pocket Monsters' Stadium	Music with Mitsuhiro Hikino and Kenta Nagata	
1999	Pokémon Stadium	Music with Hajime Wakai and Kenta Nagata	
2000	Mario Artist: Talent Studio	Music with Kazumi Totaka and Kenta Nagata	
2000	The Legend of Zelda: Majora's Mask	Music with Koji Kondo	
2001	Animal Crossing	Music with Kazumi Totaka, Kenta Negata, and Shinobu Tanaka (Indoor BGM)	
2002	Super Mario Sunshine	Sound effects	
2002	The Legend of Zelda: The Wind Waker	Music with Kenta Nagata, Hajime Wakai, and Koji Kondo	
2003	Mario Golf: Toadstool Tour	Sound effects	
2005	Yoshi Touch & Go	Music with Kazumi Totaka and Asuka Hayazaki	
2006	The Legend of Zelda: Twilight Princess	Music with Asuka Hayazaki and Koji Kondo	
2007	The Legend of Zelda: Phantom Hourglass	Music with Kenta Nagata	
2007	Wii Fit	Music with Manaka Kataoka and Shiho Fujii	
2008	Super Smash Bros. Brawl	"Title (Big Brain Academy)"	
2008	Wii Music	Music with Kenta Nagata and Mahito Yokota	
2009	The Legend of Zelda: Spirit Tracks	Music with Manaka Kataoka, Asuka Hayazaki, and Koji Kondo	
2011	Steel Diver	Music with Atsuko Asahi	
2011	Mario Kart 7	Sound support	
2012	WaraWara Plaza	Music	
2013	Super Mario 3D World	Music with Mahito Yokota, Yasuaki Iwata, and Koji Kondo	
2014	Steel Diver: Sub Wars	Music with Kenta Nagata and Atsuko Asahi	
2014	Super Smash Bros. for Nintendo 3DS and Wii U	"Smiles and Tears"	
2015	Splatoon	Music with Shiho Fujii	
2016	The Legend of Zelda: Twilight Princess HD	Sound supervisor	
2017	Mario Kart 8 Deluxe	Music with several others	
2017	Splatoon 2	Music with Ryo Nagamatsu and Shiho Fujii	
2018	Splatoon 2: Octo Expansion	Music with Ryo Nagamatsu	
2019	Super Mario Maker 2	Music with Koji Kondo, Atsuko Asahi and Sayako Doi	
2022	Nintendo Switch Sports	Sound support	
2022	Splatoon 3	Music with several others	
2024	Splatoon 3: Side Order	Music with several others	
2026	Tomodachi Life: Living the Dream	Music with Shinobu Nagata, Reika Nakai, and Kairi Hamada	
