= Shiver, Frye and Big Man =

Fictional pop idol group in the Splatoon series

- Splatoon characters
- Artwork of Shiver (left), Frye (right) and Big Man (centre)
- First appearance: Splatoon 3 (2022)
- Created by: Seita Inoue
- Voiced by: Anna Sato (Shiver); Laura Yokozawa (Frye)

In-universe information
- Aliases: Fire & Ice (Shiver and Frye); Ian BGM (Big Man)
- Species: Octoling (Shiver); Inkling (Frye); Manta ray (Big Man)
- Occupation: Hosts of Anarchy Splatcast; Treasure Hunters

Shiver Hohojiro (Japanese: ホホジロ フウカ, Hepburn: Hohojiro Fūka), Frye Onaga (Japanese: オナガ ウツホ, Hepburn: Onaga Utsuho) and Big Man (Japanese: マンタロー, Hepburn: Mantarō) are a trio of characters in the Splatoon video game series. They first appeared in Splatoon 3 (2022) as an idol pop music group known as Deep Cut (Japanese: すりみ連合, Hepburn: Surimi rengō; lit. "Fish-Paste Union"), in which they provide content/news updates to the player as well as being responsible for some of the music that appears during matches and Splatfests. They also serve as antagonists in the game's single-player campaign, Return of the Mammalians. Deep Cut returned in the Splatoon spin-off Splatoon Raiders.

Created by Splatoon 3 co-creator Seita Inoue, the group was designed as antitheses to the series' previous musical duos, with a lean more into the bad boy archetype as well as using animal motifs to represent being predators of squid and octopuses. Additionally, they were designed to centre around the game's themes of chaos and the number 3; each member's physical design and music were also inspired by a different international culture. Shiver and Frye are voiced by Anna Sato and Laura Yokozawa respectively.

Shiver, Frye and Big Man have received praise from both critics and fans, with Big Man being considered a fan favourite online, but the characters would cause intense conflict within the Splatoon community during Splatfests. Upon her reveal, Shiver was subjected to speculation from outlets about being non-binary. Nintendo would later deny these claims, but fans would continue to headcanon the concept.

== Design and conception ==
Shiver, Frye and Big Man were created for the 2022 Nintendo Switch game Splatoon 3, being revealed in a Nintendo Direct in August that year. They form the idol group Deep Cut and are hosts of the Anarchy Splatcast news program airing in the game's hub, Splatsville, and the group's home turf is located in a region called the Splatlands. Outside of their music and hosting careers, the group are also bandits who steal valuables to support the poor of Splatsville, with their news program actually being a pirate radio broadcast that hijacks Splatsville's actual programming. The trio, who are popular among the locals of Splatsville, are descendants of families that have handled the festivals and religious ceremonies in the city for generations. The members were first acquainted in school; Shiver and Frye would later bond over their love of music, eventually meeting Big Man to accompany their music making by playing piano, eventually forming Deep Cut.

=== Design ===
Shiver Hohojiro is a blue-haired Octoling with red eyes and accents. She is described as having thin, narrow eyes, with her hair covering one of them. Her outfit consists of shark tooth earrings, a blue top over a white sarashi and a shimenawa tied around her head. She also wears thick clogs, making her stand slightly taller than Frye. Her design is mainly inspired by Japanese culture. Shiver is a member of the Hohojiro family, a family of shark tamers, with Shiver a successor to the title of shark tamer. Shiver speaks with a Kyoto dialect, with 3's director Seita Inoue stating in an interview that this was due to wanting to mix up influences that were opposite to the western influences used in Splatoon 1 and 2. A popular bug involving Shiver was discovered and replicated among players in early versions of the game. The bug involved items of clothing on Shiver becoming invisible when the player views her in the Anarchy Splatcast studio through a translucent jellyfish NPC, leaving only the sarashi.

Frye Onaga is a yellow-haired Inkling with purple accents and yellow eyes. She has brown skin, a wide forehead, long ears, purple fingertips and downward-turned facial features such as drooping eyes. Her outfit consists of a yellow cropped top over a cropped turtleneck, baggy trousers with holes and toeless socks, and an accessory in her hair resembling fried food. Her top lights up in-rhythm with her group's music. Frye's design is mainly inspired by Indian culture. She is a successor to the Onaga Clan, a group of eel charmers.

Big Man is large bipedal manta ray who uses his pelvic fins to walk. His body is covered in white and grey markings and he dons a red and white traditional Japanese headdress. Unlike Shiver and Frye, Big Man communicates through unconventional noises, with translations of his dialogue appearing in his text boxes. Big Man's design is also rooted in Brazilian culture. His real name is Manta Tarou Kizaemon Munekiyo, which he changed due to it being too long. He also created some music under the alias Ian BGM, which was first seen when he collaborated with the Squid Sisters for the song "Liquid Sunshine". Shiver and Frye perceived the collaboration as a betrayal and in-turn created the song "Big Betrayal" to call him out. However, Big Man amended his relation with the two by explaining the collaboration was meant to help bridge the two groups, with "Liquid Sunshine" being a charity song meant to help Splatsville. Big Man is the head of the Manta Clan, a well-known family of the Splatlands and owners of Manda Ryuu, a traditional dance school.

During certain Splatfests, the group will change their outfit to fit with the theme. During the Splatoween festival, the group wore Halloween costumes. During the Frosty Fest, the group wore masks, top hats and gowns to match with the masquerade themed outfits released around the time. During 3's final Splatfest, they wore punk era outfits; Shiver wears a Deep Cut logo tattoo and a different hair piece, Frye stylised her hair into a bun resembling tiny spikes and wear metallic wire on her ears and Big Man is fitted with spiky overalls and eye shadow.

Structurally, Deep Cut is divided between a hybrid vocalist, an MC and a DJ, with Big Man creating "EDM-based" music tracks whilst Shiver and Frye provide the vocals. According to Japanese website Real Sound, Deep Cut song titles such as "Anarchy Rainbow" and "Till Depth Do Us Part" use a kanji and katakana naming scheme in Japanese similar to the earlier work of musician Ringo Sheena. In addition, the group's style has been described as a mix of "Shōwa era delinquency and traditional Japanese culture dating back to the Edo period". On their own, Shiver and Frye form the duo Fire & Ice, which was formed when facing Off the Hook in a rap battle on the song "Suffer No Fools". During the final Splatfest, called the Grand Festival, Deep Cut formed a group with both the Squid Sisters and Off the Hook called Now or Never Seven to perform the song "Three Wishes".

In Splatoon Raiders, Deep Cut's designs were slightly changed; Shiver and Frye are equipped with fishing gear as opposed to their masks and Big Man has a slightly browner skin tone and bandages on his fins.

=== Concept ===
Concept art of the group during early stages of Splatoon 3's development. In this design, Big Man resembles a large octoling rather his final manta ray design.

Many of the themes used to design Splatoon 3 were incorporated into the creation of Deep Cut. During an interview with Famitsu, director Seita Inoue and producer Hisashi Nogami stated that the number 3 was a core concept that was applied to many aspects of the game, with Inoue adding that he believed third instalments were seen as a culmination or evolution, leaning into the idea of festivals. Inoue continued that festivals also fit into another theme of the number 3, the concept of chaos. During Splatoon 2's final Splatfest, players were given the choice between two sides to fight for: Chaos vs Order. Unlike previously hosted Splatfests, the developers of the game revealed the next game would be built up on the concept that won. Following the end of the Splatfest, Chaos became the basis on how developers approached the next entry. Much of the world design in Splatoon 3 was influenced by the concept of chaos, such as the culture of the world of Splatoon, including the hub of the game, Splatsville. The mixing of the concepts of chaos and the number 3 led to the creation of Deep Cut's name. The group's Japanese name, Surimi rengō, translates to "fish-paste union" in English, incorporating surimi as well as Japanese character for "three" (三). Inoue mentioned that the name popped into his head after struggling to try and combine three into the name. He mentioned that their catchphrase, "hona kaisan!" (Well then, dismiss! (Note: In the English localisations, their catchphrase is "Catch ya later!")), came about when trying to create a greeting that rivalled previous idols' catchphrases.

When initially designing Deep Cut, Inoue stated they started out as festival representatives but felt that by increasing the number of idols would mean challenging both the Squid Sisters and Off the Hook. To differentiate them from their predecessors, he played around with the concept of the group being "loveable villains" and leaned into the bad boy archetype; using motifs such as moray eels, sharks and rays in the members' designs due to those animals being predators of squids and octopuses. Inoue added that despite being "bad boys", he designed them to play a role in both the hub of Splatsville and in the story campaign as popular representatives of the people of Splatsville; he elaborated that to support their home town through financial difficulty, they became thieves to make money.

During a boss battle with Big Man during Splatoon 3's story campaign, Big Man dives into the ground and transforms into a large silhouette of a manta ray, which would split into smaller versions when attacked. Outlets such as Polygon commented on its resemblance to a boss battle during the level "The Manta Storm" from 2002's Super Mario Sunshine, in which Mario fights a similar giant shadow manta ray, with journalists highlighting both bosses use a yellow and greenish-blue ink colour scheme. When asked about the parallels in an interview, Inoue acknowledged the reference, joking that "when it [came] to ink, manta rays and bosses, we had no choice but to do it."

The trio's music were inspired by different cultures; Shiver's singing utilising riffs reminiscent of traditional Japanese singing and Frye's vocal melody was described as "[feeling] as if a desert is in sight". Their music is also influenced by Brazilian music, primarily in their beats. This is most evident in the song "Anarchy Rainbow", with the song being described as having Japanese tones and vocals mixed with Brazilian and Indian influences. The inspirations can also be seen when the trio host Splatfests, with these events resembling Carnival, although the developers have also compared them to Japanese festivals such as the Danjiri Festival and the Gion Festival. According to Nogami, the festivals took influence and elements from many different regions from both inside and outside of Japan. Their song, "Anarchy Rainbow", is seen as a reference to both the news program as well as their colourful attire. Their news program, Anarchy Splatcast, has a set resembling Kamigata rakugo. In-universe, Frye was responsible for the creation of the song whilst she was eating okonomiyaki.

Shiver is voiced by traditional Japanese folk singer Anna Sato, whereas Frye is voiced by singer-songwriter Laura Yokozawa. Big Man's voice actor remains unknown. When asked if Shiver and Frye's designs resembling their voice actors was intentional, Inoue stated it was a coincidence, adding that the similarities were based on impressions of the voices and songs after first deciding on the designs.

== Appearances ==
=== Splatoon games ===
Shiver, Frye and Big Man first appeared in 2022's Splatoon 3, serving as hosts of the game through their TV and radio news program "Anarchy Splatcast", providing the player with information regarding stage rotations, future updates and Splatfests. The studio in which they broadcast the Splatcast is located next to the game's lobby; the group will wave at the player if look into the studio. They also act as mascots for Splatfests, each representing one of the three teams players can pick between. During Splatfests, the trio would host festivals in Splatsville, donning masks and performing their songs such as "Anarchy Rainbow" as their band Deep Cut. Each member perform on individual mobile stages that move around the town, which at one point players were able to access due to a glitch. In September 2023, a Splatfest was held to celebrate Splatoon 3's one year anniversary, in which the theme was to determine which Deep Cut member would be best suited as leader. At the end of the Splatfest, it was announced that Shiver was the winner. A similar Splatfest was held for 3's final Splatfest, Past vs Present vs Future, with Deep Cut representing Team Future. The result of the Splatfest determined the Squid Sister's team, Team Past, as the winners; Team Future won zero points following the unveiling of the results.

In Splatoon 3's single-player campaign, Return of the Mammalians, the trio appear as antagonists throughout the story. After the player (Agent 3) reaches Alterna and meets the New Squidbeak Splatoon, Agent 3 is approached by Deep Cut. They reveal that they are actually bandits who steal valuable items and use the profit from the valuables to support the poor of Splatsville; stating that they have arrived in Alterna to hunt for treasure. Believing that Agent 3 and the New Squidbeak Splatoon are also after the treasure, the trio fight Agent 3 across the Alterna islands. In Frye's boss battle, under the title "The Eel Deal", she sits atop a large cube and launches a swarm of moray eels at the player, eventually also using her cube to attack the player as well. In Shiver's battle, under the title "The Cold-Blooded Bandit", she attacks the player whilst riding her megalodon shark called Master Mega. In Big Man's fight, under the title "The Hype Manta Storm", he dives into the floor and transforms into a giant manta ray silhouette, dividing into smaller silhouettes when hit by the player. By the end of the game, the trio team up with the New Squidbeak Splatoon to take on the campaign's main antagonist, Mr. Grizz.

In Splatoon Raiders, Shiver, Frye and Big Man travel with a mechanic to the Spirhalite Islands to hunt for treasure after finding a map in a basement. The helicopter they are travelling in crashes, leaving the group to try and survive on the island.

=== Other media ===
Outside of the Splatoon series of games, Deep Cut appeared in Super Smash Bros. Ultimate; they were added as a collectable spirit during a 2024 update. As part of Animal Crossing: New Horizons's 3.0 update in January 2026, a set of Splatoon-themed furniture and clothing can be unlocked by scanning Splatoon series amiibo figurines, including a sofa designed to look like Big Man, and the tops of Shiver and Frye. Additionally, two villagers returning villagers from Animal Crossing: New Leaf - Welcome amiibo, Cece and Viché, were added and redesigned to cosplay Shiver and Frye respectively instead of Callie and Marie.

During Nintendo Live 2022, a two-day in-person video game competition and live music event hosted at Tokyo Big Sight, Nintendo hosted Splatoon 3 and Animal Crossing concerts, with Deep Cut and DJ KK performing. During the Splatoon 3 concert, called BankaLive in Japan, (Note: The name stems from the Japanese term, Bankara, which was used by developers when designing Splatoon 3 and represented as a counterculture to Haikara, with developers describing the term to mean "something rough and a bit wild.") Deep Cut perform and dance through the use of holograms. During the concert, Deep Cut performed a live rendition of "Anarchy Rainbow", as well as the songs "Fins in the Air" and "Hide and Sleek". At the end of the concert, Deep Cut were joined by the Squid Sisters to perform "Calamari Inkantation 3MIX". A follow-up concert was headlined for Nintendo Live 2024 Tokyo at Tokyo Big Sight. However, following threats made towards staff of the event, Nintendo Live 2024 Tokyo was cancelled. Nintendo subsequently announced that the Splatoon concert, alongside a The Legend of Zelda orchestra concert, were postponed and instead would be streaming pre-recorded versions of the concerts on YouTube in February 2024. The concert, known as BankaLive Thunder in Japan, featured 10 songs as well as an appearance of Pearl and Marina from Off the Hook. Weekly Famitsu ran a four-panel manga series illustrated by Kino Takahashi based on Splatoon 3, in which Deep Cut have made appearances.

=== Merchandise ===
In October 2023, Japanese manufacturing company San-Ei Boeki announced and released plush toys of Deep Cut available for purchase at Nintendo stores in Japan as well as the My Nintendo Store.

On 17 November 2023, Nintendo released a wave of amiibo figurines based on Shiver, Frye and Big Man, available for purchase separately as well as a 3-in-1 bundle. The amiibo can unlock exclusive gear in Splatoon 3 inspired by the character that was scanned in, as well as can save an outfit the player is currently wearing. Additionally, the amiibo allows the player to take photos with them. A second set of amiibo figurines based on their appearances in Splatoon Raiders are planned to be released alongside the game on the 23 July 2026 and will similarly be available for purchase separately as well as a 3-in-1 bundle. Unlike the previous set, the base of the Raiders figurines were designed to fit together to be a part of a unified display.

== Critical reception ==
Since their reveal, the trio received positive reception from both fans and critics, with some creating fan art and memes about the group, such as about Frye's forehead or expressing their love for Big Man. To celebrate Splatoon 3's release, the Splatoon France Twitter account held a poll on who was the most popular member of Deep Cut. A day after the poll was launched, Big Man received the most votes at around 8,200 votes, Shiver at around 3,000 votes and Frye received the least at 500 votes. However, the poll was scrutinised by Inside Games as not being the best way to measure the group's popularity as users would need to reply to the poll to vote for Frye. In an article for Xtra Magazine, V.S. Wells described Deep Cut's song Anarchy Rainbow as "a celebration of diverse perspectives" due to its Japanese odori, Brazilian Samba and Bollywood inspirations. Real Sound's Noi Mura described Deep Cut's discography as "creating a unique chaotic pop sound" and crediting it as "something that could only be achieved with Splatoon". Mura elaborated by writing that their music is so unique they could not truly compare it to anything else, using BTS's "Idol" as the closest example to Deep Cut's approach to mixing cultural influences in their songs. Polygon's Ana Diaz described the group as having "an edgier vibe than the pop princesses of previous titles".

Out of the trio, Big Man was picked as a fan favourite, with GamesRadar+'s Hope Bellingham owing this to his name and "lovably dorky appearance". In a comparison of the series' idol groups, Tim Rattray of Nintendo Life described Big Man as the highlight of Deep Cut, comparing his expression to that of a smiling emoji and noting how "everyone wants to hug him". Upon his reveal, Big Man was trending on Twitter under the hashtag "#BIGMANSWEEP", with many using the hashtag to create Big Man fan art. Conversely, Shiver and Frye received a lukewarm reception, although critics still praised their designs. Writing for TheGamer, Jade King wrote about how Shiver's traditionalist design complemented Frye's more exuberant personality, describing how it was joyful to watch them perform. King added that the pair continued a trend in the series of the idols being relatable and having distinct and playful relationships. In an article for Inside Games, Tea Pudding discussed how Shiver was more popular than Frye in Japan because of her "slanted eyes, fair skin, and bewitching charm", which made her seem more mature. However, Tea Pudding later opined that although they initially believed Frye's design and mannerisms embodied childishness, Frye actually possessed a "hidden charm" and was the more mature and reliable member of the group that drives the overall dynamic, while Shiver served more as a frontman. Additionally, Tea Pudding suggested that Frye had a "quite unique design", commenting that "her belly-baring outfit accentuates her beautiful brown skin" and describing her overall charm as cool. Following their reveal, Pop Team Epic manga artist Bkub Okawa designed fan art for both Shiver and Frye.

Deep Cut have had an impact on how the Splatoon community performed during Splatfests, with fans opting to play for the team represented by its respective member, rather than the theme the team is representing. In an article written by associate professor at Brock University Derek Foster, he wrote how the Splatoon community equate Deep Cut to that of real-world celebrities, describing it as an example of parasocial relationships. He added that this was a continuation of Japan's 2.5D idol culture similar to Hatsune Miku and would lead to fan engagement through competition. He notes that this would lead to fans become more attached to members of Deep Cut, but it can also create discourse and division between the community. Foster observed that Shiver had won 8 out of the 11 Splatfests that had been held at the time of writing, compared to Frye's 1 win. Additionally, Inside Games's Tea Pudding reported on how during the first Splatfest, Shiver's team had double the voter turnout of Frye's team, speculating that it likely reflected that Frye was less popular than Shiver. According to Foster, this has led to a sizeable hate campaign against Shiver with some people threatening fans of the character, as well as making accusations of favouritism towards Nintendo as result of Frye's losing streak. Additional accusations of homophobia and racism were levied towards Japanese players, with Foster observing that "fans argue that Shiver's Japanese-inspired design is winning more favour than Frye's Indian-inspired one because of racism towards darker-skinned characters" and that a majority Japanese playerbase would lead Shiver's team to victory. Other fans took a more positive approach; following the results of Splatoon 3's first Splatfest, fans in the community rallied support online for Big Man after his team, "Team Scissors", placed third. Likewise, players were rooting for Frye to get her first Splatfest win, feeling sorry she had not won unlike her group. This culminated in the "Spicy vs. Sweet vs. Sour" Splatfest, in which Frye's team, Team Sweet, were announced as the winners; players responded positively following the publishing of the results, with Destructoid's Chris Moyse writing that "it's nice to see this particular Deep Cut band member finally have their moment of glory."

After the reveal of the group in August 2022, speculation arose online around Shiver's gender. Both Splatoon fans and journalists pondered whether Shiver identified as non-binary, with Nintendo Life's Ollie Reynolds being supportive of the idea and declaring her as potentially being Nintendo's first non-binary character. (Note: TheGamer have argued that Shiver would be second following Juniper from Xenoblade Chronicles 3, who is also non-binary.) Supporters of the idea pointed to a lack of gender-specific language or pronouns unlike the other members. This was observed to be the case in multiple different localisations of trailers for the game, most notably Japanese. Additional factors pointed to her androgynous appearance as well as the colour scheme used by both the game and Deep Cut, which were heavily associated with purple, yellow, black, and white; the colour scheme of the non-binary flag. In response to the speculation, Nintendo's SVP of development and publishing Nate Bihldorff, spoke with The Verge and denied the theory, stating that Shiver was female; this was later re-confirmed by Nintendo of America and was verified by YouTube channel GameXplain. Reportedly both fans and critics were disappointed by the announcement, with Nintendo Life's Gavin Lane stating that whilst Splatoon 3 already had a non-binary design to its character creator, he exclaimed that due to Splatoon being a new intellectual property, "it felt like the perfect game to introduce a little more diversity into the world of Nintendo." Despite the disconfirmation, she remained popular with the queer gaming community, with some fans still choosing to headcanon Shiver as non-binary. Diaz observed fans on social media creating posts of Shiver and Frye with pride flags based on the former's speculated sexuality.
