= Splatoon 3 =

2022 video game

- Developer: Nintendo EPD (Note: Additional work by Monolith Soft, SRD, and Bandai Namco Studios Singapore & Malaysia)
- Publisher: Nintendo
- Directors: Seita Inoue; Shintaro Sato
- Producer: Hisashi Nogami
- Designers: Yoshiteru Fukuda; Kenji Matsumoto; Yoshihiko Ito
- Programmers: Soichi Nakajima; Seiichi Yamaguchi; Toshikazu Kiuchi
- Artist: Seita Inoue
- Composers: Toshiyuki Sudo; Ryō Nagamatsu; Toru Minegishi; Shiho Fujii; Sayako Doi; Yumi Takahashi
- Series: Splatoon
- Platform: Nintendo Switch
- Release: 9 September 2022
- Genre: Third-person shooter
- Modes: Single-player, multiplayer

Splatoon 3 (Note: Japanese: スプラトゥーン3, Hepburn: Supuratūn Surī) is a 2022 third-person shooter game developed and published by Nintendo for the Nintendo Switch. It is the third game in the Splatoon series and the sequel to Splatoon 2. Like its predecessors in the Splatoon series, the game consists of online multiplayer (player versus player and player versus environment) alongside a single-player story campaign, both featuring combat based around ink-firing weapons. A single-player downloadable content (DLC) expansion titled Side Order was released on 22 February 2024 as the second half of the paid Splatoon 3 Expansion Pass.

The game was first revealed in a teaser trailer on 17 February 2021 and was subsequently released on 9 September 2022. The game received generally favorable reviews, with praise for its expanded single player campaign, customization options, and gameplay mechanics, but criticism for its matchmaking and disconnection issues and lack of new content. As of 31 March 2024, Splatoon 3 has sold 11.96 million copies worldwide, making it the fastest-selling game in the franchise and one of the best-selling Switch games.

== Gameplay ==
Like its predecessors in the Splatoon series, Splatoon 3 is a third-person shooter. Players choose to be either an Inkling or Octoling as their player character. Both wield weaponry that uses colored ink as ammunition. Weapons are diverse in ability and imagery, with most resembling household objects. For example, Rollers are large paint rollers that can cover large amounts of area in ink but are generally limited to close-range combat, while Chargers are weapons which resemble a sniper rifle, and have long range for sniping opponents but are less effective at painting the ground. Splatoon 3 expands upon this by adding new main, sub, and special weapons to the game. Main weapons are chosen by the player, and include a sub weapon and a special weapon. Sub weapons act as secondary weapons, often for tactical purposes, that use up more ink. For example, the Splat Bomb which resembles a grenade, or the Splash Wall which blocks incoming enemy ink and damages players. Special weapons require the player to cover the ground with a varying amount of ink in order to charge up their special gauge, to deploy a powerful effect. Inklings and Octolings have the ability to morph into a squid or octopus form, respectively. This form is referred to as the "swim form", (Note: Prior to the introduction of Octolings as playable characters in Splatoon 2, this was referred to as the "squid form".) and can be used to climb ink-covered walls and swim through ink faster than the humanoid forms can walk. Weapons have a limited amount of ink ammunition that replenishes over time, but submerging in ink via the swim form replenishes it quicker than in humanoid form. Some weapons consume more ink then others, such as the Dynamo roller. All main and sub weapon types and the majority of weapon kits from Splatoon 2 returned in Splatoon 3, with the addition of 15 new ones.

=== Modes ===
==== Competitive ====
An Inkling engaging in the online Turf War mode

Returning from its predecessors as a playable online multiplayer game mode is Regular Battle, known as Turf War. In Turf War, two teams of four players compete to cover the most the map's area in their respective ink color for three minutes. Each team can cover over an area covered by the opponents ink with their own color. When walked on, the opposing team's ink slows movement, gradually deals damage and prevents the use of the player's swim form. Each player is equipped with a weapon set, chosen before each match, and each set comes with secondary and special weapons in addition to its main weapon. Secondary weapons provide alternative methods of attacking the other team and inking the ground; for example, Splat Bombs that explode a second after contact with the surface and Burst Bombs that explode upon impact. When enough ground is covered in a player's ink, they may use a special weapon, which are primarily used to attack the opposing team. Weapons and other forms of attack can deal damage to opposing players; when enough damage is given, they will "splat" their opponent, forcing them to restart from their starting location. Whichever team covers the largest portion of the field at the end of the match is declared the winner.

Once a player gains enough experience points to reach level 10, (Note: Alternatively by transferring data from Splatoon 2) they gain access to a ranked mode called Anarchy Battles, (Note: Named "Ranked Battles" in its predecessors) featuring several different battle types. A game lasts for a maximum of five minutes plus overtime if certain conditions depending on the game mode are met. Clam Blitz is an invasion game with elements inspired by basketball and American football. The game mode sees players collect golden clams and deposit them in the opponent's goals. A Power Clam is needed to break open the opposing basket to score, which is created by collecting eight regular clams. The team who deposited the most clams by the end of the match or has depleted their remaining score to 0 is declared the winner. Splat Zones plays similarly to king of the hill; two teams aim to control one or two "splat zones" for a set amount of time. A zone is controlled when it is 70% covered in a teams ink, and if the map has two zones both must be controlled for the timer to count down. Tower Control requires a team to escort a moving tower to a goal at the enemy's base. When the tower is controlled by one team, it moves toward that team's goal line, stopping to clear checkpoints along the way, with a team winning when the tower reaches their goal line or making it the furthest when time runs out. The Rainmaker game mode functions similarly to capture the flag, in which players attempt to carry a weapon called the Rainmaker from the center of the stage to various checkpoints until they reach the opponent's side of the map.

This game also sees the return of "Splatfests", where players choose to join one of three teams (compared to the two teams in the previous games) over a particular theme, and over three days they engage in matches to gain the most points for victory. In Splatoon 3, a new "Tricolor Turf War" mode can be played during the second half of a Splatfest, where one team of four players defends an "Ultra Signal" at the center of the map from two teams of two attacking players. When an attacking team takes control of the Ultra Signal, it will summon a "Sprinkler of Doom", which will automatically ink a portion of the map's area for that team.

==== Salmon Run Next Wave ====
Players team up to defeat the King Salmonid Cohozuna boss in the co-op Salmon Run mode.

The co-op player versus environment (PvE) mode Salmon Run returns, titled Salmon Run Next Wave. The main goal is to collect Golden Eggs, obtained by splatting special enemies known as "Boss Salmonids", and depositing them into the egg basket. Salmon Run Next Wave uses the same basic gameplay as it does in Splatoon 2, where the player, employed by Grizzco Industries, teams up with three other players to fight waves of enemies known as "Salmonids". Each match, known as a "shift", typically lasts three waves, though, in Next Wave, a fourth "Xtrawave" sometimes occurs, where players team up to defeat a King Salmonid. By successfully meeting the quota of golden eggs for all waves in a shift, the player can increase their rank within Grizzco. Next Wave adds the ability to throw Golden Eggs along with new enemies and unique, event-specific boss types. Salmon Run is also no longer limited to certain times of day; players are able to access Salmon Run at any time, even during Splatfests. A new addition to Splatoon 3 is "Big Run", an event where Salmonids invade the city of Splatsville. Players defend Splatsville by fighting invading Salmonids on an online competitive map, instead of the unique stages typically used for Salmon Run. After a few days, the event ends and participating players receive a prize. This event occurs every few months. There is also another Salmon Run event called "Eggstra Work", where teams compete to get the most golden eggs in a predetermined shift consisting of 5 waves.

==== Tableturf Battle ====
A digital collectible card game based on Turf War in which players build a deck of collected cards. In Tableturf Battle, each card can be used to apply a pattern on a grid, and after a "special attack" is charged, it can be used to place a pattern overwriting the opponent's patterns.

== Setting ==
The Splatoon games take place on a version of Earth set far in the future after the extinction of humanity and almost all mammal life, suggested to be due to climate change, where much of oceanic life has evolved to live on land. Splatoon 3 takes place five years after the events of Splatoon 2 in the Splatlands, a sun-scorched desert inhabited by battle-hardened Inklings and Octolings, and Splatsville, a city of chaos that developed rapidly since the last Splatfest in Splatoon 2, "Chaos vs. Order". The game's overall "chaotic" design was chosen in accordance with Team Chaos claiming victory in said Splatfest.

The story mode of Splatoon 3, titled Return of the Mammalians, is set in a new location called Alterna, a large, snowy area littered with incomplete structures and hazardous Fuzzy Ooze, an ink-like substance mostly covered in brown fur, with a rocket at its center. It focuses on the reappearance of mammals, which have been long-extinct.

The plot of Splatoon 3's single-player expansion, Side Order, sees Agent 8, the protagonist of Splatoon 2: Octo Expansion, awake in a virtual reality called the Memverse, created by Marina of Off the Hook, that has been hijacked by rogue artificial intelligence who seeks to remove the free will of the people in the real world.

=== Plot ===
The player character follows Craig Cuttlefish, the elderly former captain of the New Squidbeak Splatoon, into Splatsville's neighboring crater, which is covered with hazardous Fuzzy Ooze. The player is recruited by Cuttlefish into the Squidbeak Splatoon as Agent 3 along with their Salmonid companion, Smallfry. Smallfry is able to eat and clear away most Fuzzy Ooze, allowing passage further into the crater. They fight Octarian enemies mutated by the ooze; Cuttlefish assumes their leader, DJ Octavio, is responsible for thieving the Great Zapfish that powers Splatsville. At the crater's base, Octavio appears in his mech, accusing the New Squidbeak Splatoon of kidnapping his Octarian warriors. Following his defeat in battle, Octavio denies having taken the Zapfish. The ground breaks apart, Cuttlefish being taken away by Fuzzy Ooze. Agent 3 and Smallfry fall into the remains of a former underground human settlement named Alterna.

Agent 3 meets Callie and Marie, formally Agents 1 and 2, of the New Squidbeak Splatoon, as well as the Captain, the player protagonist of the first game, and realizes that Cuttlefish has gone missing. The group is approached by the Splatsville-based idol trio Deep Cut, who are ransacking Alterna for "treasure". The trio antagonize the Squidbeak Splatoon, believing they are in the settlement for the same reason. Aided by an artificial intelligence named O.R.C.A., (Note: An acronym for "Omniscient Recording Computer of Alterna") the Squidbeak Splatoon explore the city in search of Cuttlefish, but are repeatedly intercepted by Deep Cut and forced to fight them over the treasure. It is revealed that Mr. Grizz, a giant grizzly bear and one of the remaining mammals on Earth, as well as the CEO of Grizzco Industries and organizer of Salmon Run, has kidnapped Cuttlefish and is responsible for taking the Great Zapfish and Octarian army, proving Octavio's innocence. Atop a rocket in Alterna's center, Mr. Grizz divulges that he aims to restore mammal life to Earth by converting the living sea animals to fuzzy creatures by way of the Ooze.

After using the treasure to assemble a cutting device and reaching the rocket, Deep Cut allies with the Squidbeak Splatoon to defeat Mr. Grizz after they are given the treasure for free (as the Squidbeak Splatoon no longer needs it) and also become Marie's employees, to the latter's dismay. Deep Cut also reveals that they wish to sell the treasure for charity. They reach the top of the rocket where Cuttlefish is being held and find Mr. Grizz having "dehydrated" the former for his "essence", seemingly killing him. The Captain rehydrates Cuttlefish with their tears as Mr. Grizz launches the rocket into space, and Deep Cut provides Agent 3 a lift onto it using their tamed eels and shark. Agent 3, with help from Octavio and Smallfry, defeats Mr. Grizz and destroys the rocket. Agent 3, Smallfry, and Octavio return to Earth with the Great Zapfish, and Mr. Grizz is seen floating in space during the credits.

== Development ==
Splatoon 3 was developed by Nintendo EPD, with additional work done by Monolith Soft, who also assisted in the development of previous Splatoon games, as well as SRD and Bandai Namco Studios Singapore & Malaysia. The game makes use of NLPN, Nintendo's in-house server system, which supports expanded lobby features and better matchmaking.

At E3 2019, after the announcement of Splatoon 2's final Splatfest, "Chaos vs. Order", Splatoon producer Hisashi Nogami stated that a third entry in the series was not in development. In an "Ask the Developer" interview on Nintendo's website, it was revealed that the direction of Splatoon 3's world was decided after Team Chaos won Splatoon 2's final Splatfest, with the developers planning for both outcomes before the Splatfest winner was decided. In a Splatoon 3 Direct on 10 August 2022, Nintendo confirmed that the game would receive two years worth of updates releasing every three months using a seasonal approach, which would feature the addition of more stages and weapons, as well as large-scale paid downloadable content (DLC).

== Marketing and release ==
Splatoon 3 was announced with a teaser trailer in a Nintendo Direct on 17 February 2021. The trailer revealed items, weapons, abilities, and an apocalyptic design. More details were revealed later that year in September, including the name of Splatoon 3's single-player mode, Return of the Mammalians.

A trailer for Splatoon 3's co-op mode "Salmon Run" premiered in a Nintendo Direct on 9 February 2022. On 22 April, Nintendo uploaded a video to its YouTube channel showing gameplay of the "Turf War" game mode, as well as announcing the release date of 9 September 2022. Additionally, Splatoon 2: Octo Expansion was announced to be included with the Expansion Pack tier of Nintendo Switch Online. In July, Nintendo announced a special edition Nintendo Switch OLED model themed on the game, with a release date of 26 August 2022. In addition, the company announced a Splatoon 3-themed Pro Controller and carrying case, which released alongside the game.

On 10 August 2022, Nintendo broadcast a Splatoon 3-focused Nintendo Direct, revealing the date for the game's Splatfest World Premiere, a limited time demo Splatfest. Nintendo announced that the game would have amiibo support, with several new figurines that can be used to take photos with the characters in-game and receive special gear items, similar to past Splatoon titles. It introduced three new "idol" characters known as Shiver, Frye and Big Man, collectively referred to as "Deep Cut". Also announced in the Nintendo Direct, the game is set to receive both large-scale paid DLC and two years of support via free updates. On 25 August 2022, a Nintendo Treehouse Presentation was broadcast which showcased the single-player story mode and the multiplayer lobby, alongside weapons and multiplayer maps.

The pre-launch Splatfest World Premiere event was held on 27 and 28 August 2022 with a rock-paper-scissors theme, which Team Rock won in all regions. The game was released worldwide on 9 September 2022. In a trailer on 11 October 2022, it was announced that the Splatoon 3 amiibo would launch on 11 November. During Nintendo Live 2022 on 9 October, a Splatoon 3 concert was held starring Deep Cut.

In a Nintendo Direct released on 8 February 2023, two waves of DLC, collectively the Splatoon 3 Expansion Pass, were announced, with the first wave including Inkopolis (the main hub from the first game) and the second wave including a new single player campaign called Side Order. This mode was later revealed to be a roguelite, and featured a new story with Agent 8, the protagonist of Splatoon 2: Octo Expansion. Side Order was released on 22 February 2024.

On 16 September 2024, Nintendo announced that the game would no longer receive regular content updates, although patches and seasonal events would continue.

Nintendo released an update for the game on 12 June 2025, which includes enhanced visuals and performance on the Nintendo Switch 2 console. Alongside the enhanced visuals and performance for the next generation of the Nintendo Switch, thirty new weapons were added to the game, along with a teaser trailer for the first spin-off game of the Splatoon franchise, Splatoon Raiders, which would include Deep Cut as part of the new game's main story.

== Reception ==
Reception

Aggregate scores
Aggregator	Score
Metacritic	83/100
OpenCritic	93% recommend

Review scores
Publication	Score
Destructoid	9/10
Eurogamer	Recommended
Famitsu	39/40
Game Informer	8.5/10
GameSpot	7/10
GamesRadar+	4/5
IGN	9/10 (MP); 8/10 (SP)
Nintendo Life	9/10
Shacknews	9/10
The Guardian	4/5
Video Games Chronicle	3/5
VG247	4/5

Splatoon 3 received "generally favorable" reviews according to review aggregator website Metacritic.

The game's overall presentation was commended. Wired's Reid McCarter praised the game's original, cartoony characters, as opposed to contemporary shooters' focus on realistic graphics. Alex Olney of Nintendo Life called the world of Splatoon 3 "immersi[ve]", hailing Splatsville as the series' most expansive and atmospheric hub world to date. Its soundtrack was acclaimed by Ben Johnson of Pocket Tactics, who characterized its songs as experimental, bold, and distinct. Echoing this sentiment, IGN staff wrote positively of the soundtrack's fusion of distinct cultural styles, saying that it "could easily be considered its own genre."

Splatoon 3's fine-tuning of returning gameplay elements from its predecessor was a subject of praise. Alex Donaldson of VG247 said that Splatoon 3's focus on minute refinements established it as the most polished game in the series. The revamped matchmaking lobby, which adds a physical practice range, was commended by reviewers as an improvement over previous entries' static loading screens. Salmon Run's new incarnation was received positively, with some critics applauding its indefinite availability as opposed to Splatoon 2's locking of the mode behind a timed rotation. The ability for players to manually hurl Golden Eggs a distance was seen as an adequate enhancement. Writing for Shacknews, Ozzie Mejia praised the title's new customization features, though he commented that they did not feel especially innovative compared to other shooters.

The game's movement controls were seen by critics as mechanically enjoyable. The newly-included Squid Surge and Squid Roll maneuvers were praised by some as fun additions that emphasize the frenetic pace of competetive matches. Hirun Cryer of GamesRadar+ particularly lauded the Squid Roll, which grants players brief invincibility if they perform the move as they are struck with enemy ink. He stated that the mechanic helps to reinforce a more in-depth gameplay experience that rewards players for taking time to hone their skills. Brian Shea of Game Informer similarly praised the game's overall movement as intuitive.

Numerous reviewers took issue with a perceived lack of significant new content. Alex Olney opined that Splatoon 3's lack of a "big addition" akin to Splatoon 2's Salmon Run prevented the title from truly standing out from its predecessors. Sam Machkovech of Ars Technica felt Splatoon 3 was "disappointing" in its absence of innovation compared to Splatoon 2. He derided the fact that only five of the twelve maps available at launch were unique to Splatoon 3; he also thought the new maps' terrain was uninteresting and overly flat. Martin Robinson of Eurogamer thought that even the most significant additions, like the overhauled lobby, seldom felt like "basic [ones] you'd expect of a contemporary online multiplayer game." Brendan Graeber of IGN criticized the new Tableturf Battle mode as "lackluster" and unexciting. Hirun Cryer thought winning a Tableturf Battle relied too heavily on chance, and that the mode thus failed in living up to its more strategic namesake.

A prevalence of network connectivity issues during online battles and matchmaking was heavily criticized. Steve Watts of GameSpot called in-match disconnections "frequent and unforgiving", while Kotaku's Patricia Hernandez lamented the internet irregularities as "inexcusable." Pramath of GamingBolt thought matchmaking wait times were excessively long, additionally criticizing how certain connection errors during gameplay can send players back to matchmaking. Some critics disliked the amount of non-multiplayer content that was locked behind an internet connection, including in-game shops.

The single-player campaign was reviewed favorably. Ozzie Mejia thought the expanded overworld of Return of the Mammalians was refreshing compared to the more linear hubs of prior titles. Its story was met with amiable responses, some critics calling it simple yet endearing. Several likened many of the levels to those of Splatoon 2: Octo Expansion, with some reporting an overall higher difficulty compared to previous entries' story modes. Many commended the extent to which the campaign's challenges could prepare players for the online modes. Conversely, Destructoid's Chris Carter perceived it as leaning too heavily on being a straightforward tutorial, though appreciated the levels' apparent tailoring for speedrunning. Some reviewers compared the level design to that of the greater Mario franchise, particularly the 2002 entry Super Mario Sunshine. However, others criticized certain levels for being overtly geometric and situated above nebulous environments detached from the hub world.

=== Sales ===
On 12 September 2022, Nintendo reported that Splatoon 3 had sold 3.45 million copies domestically within the first three days of launch, becoming the fastest-selling video game of all time in Japan (surpassing the previous record holder Pokémon Black and White) at the time, (Note: Splatoon 3 was surpassed as the fastest-selling game in Japan by Pokémon Scarlet and Violet in November 2022.) as well as one of the best-selling games on the Nintendo Switch. Shares of Nintendo were noted to have increased by 5.5 percent on the Tuesday following the announcement, the largest increase since December 2020. Splatoon 3 debuted at the top spot on the UK boxed charts, where it remained for three weeks until being pushed to second place by FIFA 23. As of 18 October 2022, Splatoon 3 was reported to be the highest-selling video game of 2022 in Japan, just over one month after its release.

=== Accolades ===
Year	Award	Category	Result	Ref.
2022	Golden Joystick Awards	Best Multiplayer Game	Nominated	
2022	Golden Joystick Awards	Nintendo Game of the Year	Nominated	
2022	The Game Awards 2022	Best Family Game	Nominated	
2022	The Game Awards 2022	Best Multiplayer Game	Won	
2023	New York Game Awards	Central Park Children's Zoo Award for Best Kids Game	Nominated	
2023	19th British Academy Games Awards	Multiplayer	Nominated	
2023	Japan Game Awards	Award for Excellence	Won	
