= In-house software =

Computer software for use within an organization

In-house software is computer software for business use within an organization. In-house software can be developed by the organization itself or by someone else, or it could be acquired. In-house software however may later become available for commercial use upon sole discretion of the developing organization. The need to develop such software may arise depending on many circumstances which may be non-availability of the software in the market, potentiality or ability of the corporation to develop such software or to customize a software based on the corporate organization's need.
