= Chat log =

Archive of transcripts from online chat

A chat log is an archive of transcripts from online chat and instant messaging conversations. Many chat or IM applications allow for the client-side archiving of online chat conversations, while a subset of chat or IM clients (i.e., Google Talk and Yahoo! Messenger 11 Beta) allow for the saving of chat archives on a server for future retrieval. Most IRC clients and many IRC bots include chat logging to a local file as a standard feature.

Websites exist that publish chat logs, usually dedicated to a single channel and including a search engine. This can conflict with users' expectations of privacy. Some IRC networks have published guidelines on making chat logs public. Due to their real time nature, chat logs may be used to identify anonymous users by correlating information posted on different mediums.

== Examples ==
- Google has integrated its own chat archiving feature into Gmail, which lists Google Talk conversations alongside email conversations.
- Yahoo first experimented with online archiving of Yahoo Messenger chat logs through its Yahoo! Messenger for the Web application, which separately saves its own chat archive when users communicate through that client. In 2010, the beta of the 11th version of the standalone Messenger client featured online archiving of chat logs, although the archive is only available and viewable from within the logged-in client.
- bash.org is a website hosting user-posted chat logs from IRC.
