= Skill-based matchmaking =

Form of matchmaking dependent on skill

Skill-based matchmaking (SBMM), also referred to as matchmaking ranking (MMR), is a form of matchmaking dependent on the relative skill level of the players involved.

== History ==
A common rating system in chess is the Elo rating system, developed by Arpad Elo. Former International Chess Federation president Florencio Campomanes described it as an "inseparable partner to high-level chess". In 2006, Microsoft researchers proposed a skill-based rating system using Bayesian inference and deployed it on the Xbox Live network, then one of the largest deployments of a Bayesian inference algorithm. The researchers were displeased with the ranking system in the beta of Halo 2 (2004). By the time Halo 2 launched, it was using TrueSkill.

The term skill-based matchmaking first appeared in a 2008 interview with game designer John Carmack in which he emphasized its importance in Quake Live (2010). Upon setting up an account with id Software, the game will ask the player for their skill level and judge accordingly depending on their performance from that point forward. The presence—or lack thereof—of skill-based matchmaking became a point of contention. During the development of Dota 2 (2013), Valve Software believed that the barrier to entry could be solved with, among other things, skill-based matchmaking through its Steamworks service; when Call of Duty: Black Ops (2010) developer Treyarch was asked why the game wouldn't include skill-based matchmaking unlike Halo 3 (2007), multiplayer design director David Vonderhaar said that speed was "more important than anything else".

== Description ==
Team-based, competitive games such as League of Legends (2009), Counter-Strike: Global Offensive (2012) and Counter-Strike 2 (2023), Dota 2 (2013), and Overwatch (2016) benefit from skill-based matchmaking. In contrast, Call of Duty: Black Ops II (2012)—a game that primarily focuses on single-player accomplishments—does not benefit from skill-based matchmaking. Treyarch, who developed Call of Duty: Black Ops II, consciously queued players exclusively using ping and latency, in a subversion of industry standards at the time.

=== Queues ===
In skill-based matchmaking, queue design focuses on how to divide parties into appropriate skill groups. In contrast to StarCraft II (2010), which focuses on player-on-player action, Blizzard Entertainment's Heroes of the Storm (2015) is a team-based game. The Heroes of the Storm matchmaker aims to have players win at least half of the games that they play. The game's matchmaker also aims to pair coordinated teams with other coordinated teams in order to avoid an unfair communication advantage. According to game director Ben Brode, Hearthstone (2014) maintains a separate pool of new players. Players remain in the pool until they win ten games or obtain two legendary minions.

=== Player rating model ===
The skill rating of a player is their ability to win a match based on aggregate data. Various models have emerged to achieve this. Mark Glickman implemented skill volatility into the Glicko rating system. In 2008, researchers at Microsoft extended TrueSkill for two-player games by describing a number for a player's ability to force draws. Variability in map, character, and server effects have been considered in at least two research papers. In 2016, two Cornell University graduates modeled skill rating as a vector of numbers, showing "substantial intransitivity".

== Reception ==
Skill-based matchmaking is a controversial practice. In Call of Duty: Warzone (2020), streamers of the game often seek out "bot lobbies"—lobbies with less-skilled players. The Washington Post compared the practice to "LeBron James looking to join pickup games at the local YMCA". Call of Duty: Warzone players who have spoken out against the game's use of skill-based matchmaking include 100 Thieves CEO Nadeshot, former professional Counter-Strike: Global Offensive player Shroud, and 100 Thieves co-owner CouRage. Competitive Call of Duty: Warzone player HusKerrs wrote that high-skilled players must "sweat or try hard" in order to create engaging content. Streamer TimTheTatman refused to stream Call of Duty: Modern Warfare II (2022) upon discovering that it would implement skill-based matchmaking.

In February 2023, Destiny 2 (2017) introduced skill-based matchmaking. Higher-skilled players subsequently discovered a way to enter lobbies with lower-skilled players, resulting in an outcry from the community.
