= Splatoon 2 =

2017 video game

- Cover art
- Developer: Nintendo EPD (Note: Additional work by Monolith Soft and Tose)
- Publisher: Nintendo
- Directors: Yusuke Amano; Seita Inoue; Shintaro Sato
- Producer: Hisashi Nogami
- Designer: Terumasa Kato
- Programmers: Shintaro Sato; Yosuke Morimoto; Takuya Kobayashi; Kazuhide Ueda
- Artists: Seita Inoue; Kotomi Jin; Mariko Tachibana; Yuki Hamada
- Composers: Toru Minegishi; Ryō Nagamatsu; Shiho Fujii
- Series: Splatoon
- Platform: Nintendo Switch
- Release: July 21, 2017
- Genre: Third-person shooter
- Modes: Single-player, multiplayer

Splatoon 2 (Note: Japanese: スプラトゥーン2, Hepburn: Supuratūn Tsū) is a 2017 third-person shooter game developed and published by Nintendo for the Nintendo Switch. It is the second entry in the Splatoon series as the direct sequel to Splatoon (2015). As with the previous installment, Splatoon 2 consists of online multiplayer game modes alongside a single-player campaign, all involving combat based around ink-firing weapons. An expansion pack for the single-player mode titled Octo Expansion was subsequently released as downloadable content (DLC) on June 16, 2018.

The game's development began shortly following the culmination of Splatoon's free content updates in October 2015. Its team sought to develop a "legitimate sequel" to Splatoon by including new weapons and gameplay alterations to set itself apart from its predecessor. Splatoon 2 is set approximately two years after Splatoon, a decision made to enhance the fictional world's realism.

Splatoon 2 was released on July 21, 2017. It received generally positive reviews, with critics commending its improved graphics and refinement of returning gameplay elements from its predecessor, though its online matchmaking and Nintendo Switch Online-restricted voice chat garnered criticism. As of December 31, 2022, Splatoon 2 has sold over 13.6 million copies worldwide, making it one of the best-selling Switch games. A sequel, Splatoon 3, was released on the Nintendo Switch on September 9, 2022.

== Gameplay ==
Like its predecessor, Splatoon 2 is a third-person shooter with a focus on online multiplayer in which players control humanoid cephalopods, known as Inklings and Octolings, (Note: Octolings were made playable after launch as a reward for completing Splatoon 2: Octo Expansion.) and use colored ink as ammunition to paint the surrounding area. Inklings and Octolings can morph between a distinctly humanoid form, during which they can walk and shoot ink using an assortment of weapons, and a cepholopodic form where they can quickly swim through, and hide within, ink of their own color and replenish their ink supply.

In online matches, players are equipped with a "main weapon", their primary armament that allows them to spread ink. Each main weapon is assigned a loadout of one "sub weapon" and one "special weapon". Sub weapons are secondary munitions that require ink to dispense; they usually come in the form of defensive structures or offensive projectiles. Special weapons are powerful armaments that must be individually charged by inking the surroundings. Cosmetic gear can be augmented with abilities such as being able to swim faster within their ink and increasing ink ammunition capacity.

There are a total of nine classes of main weapons, seven of which return from Splatoon. Such returnees are Shooters, which are akin to automatic rifles; Blasters, a subclass of Shooters which fire in large bursts of ink; Rollers, which specialize in painting turf; Brushes, a subclass of Rollers that specialize in high surface mobility; Chargers, which are akin to sniper rifles; Sloshers, buckets of ink that specialize in close-range combat; and Splatlings, which are akin to Gatling guns. Splatoon 2 introduces two additional classes in the form of Dualies, dual-wielded weapons that allow the player to perform "dodge rolls"; and Brellas, shotgun-like umbrellas that enable defensive maneuvers with folding shields.

=== Modes ===
==== Competitive ====
An Inkling, wielding the Splat Dualies, engaging in combat in the game's Turf War mode

Splatoon 2 sees the return of Turf War and Ranked Battles from its predecessor. The game adds League Battles as a tournament-structured version of Ranked Battles. In Turf War, players are divided into two teams of four as they compete to spread more of their colored ink across a battle arena after three minutes.

Once players achieve level 10, they are granted access to Ranked Battles, alternative modes focusing on objective-based gameplay whose availability rotates throughout the day. Ranked modes regularly last five minutes, plus overtime if specific conditions are met. Splatoon 2 features four distinct Ranked modes, being Tower Control, Rainmaker, Splat Zones, and Clam Blitz, the latter being wholly new to Splatoon 2. Tower Control tasks players with guiding a mobile tower to a designated goal in the opposing team's base, clearing mandated checkpoints along the way. Rainmaker has teams carry a large weapon to the opposing team's base. Splat Zones plays similarly to king of the hill in that teams must exert control over a designated region of the map by covering it in ink for a specific duration. Clam Blitz tasks teams with collecting clams to hurl them into designated goals in the opposition's base to deplete a points counter. Collecting ten clams generates a Power Clam, which is used to puncture the opposing goal and allow for the depositing of clams. Whichever team brings the opposition's points counter to zero, or depletes it the furthest, wins. Competitive stages and modes are routinely announced via a news broadcast by in-game idol characters Pearl and Marina of the band Off the Hook.

Splatoon 2 sees the return of Splatfests, generally monthly events where players join one of two teams in accordance with a prompt and compete against each other in Turf War matches. The prompts are typically formatted as questionnaires concerning two opposing concepts, such as "pancakes vs. waffles", "time travel vs. teleportation", or "vampire vs. werewolf". Nintendo would occasionally host promotional Splatfests in collaboration with their own intellectual properties or third-party companies, examples including "heroes vs. villains" with Super Smash Bros. Ultimate (2018) and "fries vs. McNuggets" with McDonald's respectively. Splatfests are structured as a series of Turf War matches where players accumulate points, referred to as "clout", for their chosen team by contributing in matches; the team that gains the most clout is declared the victor. Contributing to matches also increases players' Splatfest Power, a metric that determines skill-based matchmaking. Each Splatfest introduces an exclusive "Shifty Station" stage that is otherwise unavailable in regular multiplayer matches. The game's "final Splatfest", Chaos vs. Order, was held from July 18 to July 21, 2019 with Team Chaos as the winner.

==== Salmon Run ====
Salmon Run is a co-op player versus environment mode first introduced in Splatoon 2. Salmon Run is available only on certain days at Grizzco. Players are placed into a team of four and tasked to defeat hordes of hostile salmon enemies, named Salmonids, and deposit Golden Eggs to meet a designated quota for a particular "wave", of which there are three total. Golden Eggs are acquired by splatting large Boss Salmonid enemies that each have distinct attack patterns and weaknesses. Successfully completing matches advances the player's rank in Grizzco, with the mode's difficulty increasing in tandem. Being splatted by a Salmonid results in the player being incapacitated until a teammate manually revives them. The match ends prematurely if all four team members are splatted at once.

== Setting ==
The Splatoon series occurs on a post-apocalyptic version of Earth set some millennia following the extinction of humanity and subsequent rapid evolution of marine life. Splatoon 2 takes place two years after the events of Splatoon in and around Inkopolis Square. Like its predecessor, Splatoon 2 includes a single-player story campaign that follows the theft of Inkopolis' primary power source, the Great Zapfish, at the hands of the Octarian army. Another event is the contemporaneous disappearance of Callie, one half of the celebrity musical duo the Squid Sisters, which the player character is also tasked with investigating.

Splatoon 2's DLC expansion pack Octo Expansion occurs roughly around the same time as Octo Canyon. It is set in a subterranean train station named the Deepsea Metro, where an amnesiac Octoling falls into. At the direction of a talking telephone and with the assistance of Cap'n Cuttlefish, the player's guide from Splatoon who has also become trapped, Agent 8 seeks to ascend to the surface by clearing various testing facilities across the Metro to collect four objects known as "thangs". Completing the expansion's story awards players the ability to become an Octoling during multiplayer matches.

=== Plot ===
Octo Canyon takes place approximately two years after the final Splatfest of Splatoon, in which the pop idol Marie defeated her cousin and fellow Squid Sister, Callie. Having drifted apart in the months following the event, Marie worries that Callie was negatively affected by the result. After leaving Inkopolis to see her parents, Marie returns home to discover that the Great Zapfish that powers the city has gone missing, as has Callie. Cap'n Cuttlefish, the captain of the New Squidbeak Splatoon, and his understudy Agent 3 have traveled elsewhere. Fearing that the Octarians are once more involved, Marie assumes her role as Agent 2 of the Squidbeak Splatoon and recruits an Inkling, in lieu of Cuttlefish, from Inkopolis Square, the player character, to become Agent 4 and investigate.

With assistance from Marie and weapons expert Sheldon, Agent 4 makes their way through Octo Canyon fighting the Octarians and recovering several stolen Zapfish, including ones powering the Octarians' machines. They discover that Callie herself has sided with the Octarians after being brainwashed by their leader, DJ Octavio, who is once again using the Great Zapfish to power his DJ stage, the Octobot King. Marie arrives with Sheldon and frees Callie from her mind control, allowing them to help Agent 4 defeat Octavio. With the Great Zapfish safely returned to Inkopolis and DJ Octavio defeated, the Squid Sisters happily reunite and resume their music career together.

== Development ==
The initial conceptualization of Splatoon 2 began during Splatoon's series of free content updates. Production began in full around October 2015 when these updates concluded. During this period, Splatoon's development team, including producer Hisashi Nogami, considered creating an upgraded version of Splatoon as opposed to a direct follow-up. They went against this in favor of creating a "legitimate sequel" that would reinvent Splatoon's mechanics in response to the game's positive reception among fans. To this end, the team included new main and special weapons, alongside additional gameplay configurations, mechanically different from those of Splatoon. For instance, the Dualie class and its dodge-roll ability was formulated to give players wholly unique gameplay experiences. Other gameplay alterations include giving Rollers a vertical attack to improve its viability in long-range combat and the reworking of the previous game's Super Jump to accommodate the Switch's lack of a secondary GamePad.

On the game's worldbuilding, the team sought to convey a sense of realism by having time in the Splatoon series pass parallel to that of the real world. Splatoon 2 is set two years after the events of Splatoon, illustrated by the physical aging of characters and shifting of in-universe music trends. Lead sound designer Toru Minegishi intentionally developed music divergent in sound from Splatoon to symbolize progression of time, "creat[ing] it with the image of people now preferring different music than before". Nogami believed that this sense of change would inspire players to see the fictional world of Splatoon as "more real and present."

== Release ==
A limited-time global multiplayer demo for the game, known as the Splatoon 2 Global Testfire, was released in March 2017. A special edition of Nintendo Treehouse Live was streamed during the first session, in which members of the Nintendo Treehouse participated in the demo. Similarly to the demo of the original game, it was only available to play for a specific time period, across six one-hour play sessions in one weekend. Another demo session demonstrating the game's Splatfest events was held on July 15, 2017.

The game was released worldwide on July 21, 2017. In Japan and Europe, neon-green and neon-pink Joy-Con controllers and Splatoon-themed Pro Controllers were released alongside the game. A game card-free version, which features a download code inside a game case instead of a game card, was also released in Japan, as well as a Switch hardware bundle including a download code for the game. A similar bundle was released in the United States as a Walmart exclusive.

New Amiibo figures of new Inkling Girl, Boy and Squid designs from Splatoon 2 were released alongside the game. These figures, alongside previous Splatoon figures, unlock exclusive in-game clothing and music tracks and allow the player to save a loadout of weapons and clothing to the figure so they can be readily accessed at any time. Characters with these saved load-outs can be posed alongside the player for taking screenshots. Amiibo figures of Pearl and Marina from Off the Hook were released on July 13, 2018, and feature similar functionality to those already released, while a final trio of figures of Octoling Girl, Boy and Octopus designs were released in Japan and Europe on November 9, 2018, and in North America on December 7, 2018.

Like the previous game, Splatoon 2 was continually updated post-release with free content. From launch, at least one new weapon was added to the game almost every week, while new stages and game modes were added at irregular intervals. In late April 2018, this changed to having a large group of weapons added every month instead, with new stages continuing to be added until October 2018. While these regular updates were originally due to continue for around a year after the game's launch, with monthly regional Splatfest events being held for around two years, the regular updates were later extended to last until the end of 2018. An expansion pack for the game's single-player mode, titled Octo Expansion, was released on June 13, 2018.

The game's content update in December 2018 was announced as the final one, albeit with balancing patches and Splatfest events due to continue into 2019; it was later revealed that additional smaller updates would release until July 2019.

=== Promotion ===
Prior to Splatoon 2's reveal, clips of the game were featured in the announcement trailer for the Nintendo Switch. Its unanticipated appearance led to speculation by the media and public over whether or not the footage shown was that from a port of Splatoon or a direct sequel. Some commentators believed it was presented akin to an esport.

Splatoon 2 was officially unveiled to the public during the Nintendo Switch reveal presentation held in Tokyo on January 13, 2017, where it was announced for release in second or third quarter of 2017. The reveal was accompanied by a trailer featuring the game's new maps and weapons, and an on-stage appearance of producer Hisashi Nogami in-character as a scientist from the Squid Research Lab, a fictional scientific group from the game, which appeared in various promotional material for the original Splatoon.

Similarly to the first game, Splatoon 2 features Splatfest events that include crossovers with other brands, both from other Nintendo properties such as Super Smash Bros. Ultimate and third-party franchises including Teenage Mutant Ninja Turtles, McDonald's, Uniqlo, Nike, Sanrio, Meiji, and Pocky.

=== Other media ===
A manga series based on the game and illustrated by Sankichi Hinodeya began serialization in Shogakukan's CoroCoro Comic magazine on May 15, 2017. It was published in North America by Viz Media in late 2017. A motion comic adaptation of the manga was announced in July 2017 and released on YouTube the following month.

Splatune 2, a two-disc official soundtrack featuring music from the game by Toru Minegishi, Ryo Nagamatsu, and Shiho Fujii, was published by Enterbrain in Japan on November 29, 2017, debuting at number eight on Billboard Japan's Hot Albums chart. A second soundtrack album, Octotune, was released in Japan on July 18, 2018. This album features tracks added in the game's Octo Expansion DLC and other post-release updates, as well as a recording of the game's first live concert. It peaked at number five on the Hot Albums chart.

Similarly to the first game, a series of real-life virtual concerts featuring the game's signature band Off the Hook have been performed in various locations. Their first concert was held at Tokaigi 2018 in Japan on February 10, 2018. A second was performed at Polymanga in Switzerland on March 31, 2018. A third concert which featured a new song, "Nasty Majesty" from Octo Expansion, was performed at NicoNico Chokaigi in Japan on April 28, 2018. A fourth concert was performed at Tokaigi Game Party 2019 in Japan on January 26, 2019, which featured more songs from Octo Expansion. A two-day concert featuring both the Squid Sisters and Off The Hook was performed at Nintendo Live 2019 on October 13–14, 2019, which featured performances based on previous concerts.

== Reception ==
Reception

Aggregate scores
Aggregator	Score
Metacritic	83/100 (Note: Based on 107 critic reviews)
OpenCritic	90% recommend (Note: Based on 118 critic reviews)

Review scores
Publication	Score
Destructoid	8.5/10
Electronic Gaming Monthly	9/10
Famitsu	37/40
Game Informer	8.25/10
GameRevolution	4/5
GameSpot	8/10
GamesRadar+	4/5
IGN	8.3/10
Nintendo Life	10/10
Nintendo World Report	8.5/10

Splatoon 2 received "generally favorable" reviews, according to review aggregator website Metacritic, and according to fellow aggregator OpenCritic was recommended by 90% of critics.

Critics were pleased with Splatoon 2's refinement of gameplay mechanics from its predecessor. Turf War and Ranked Battles were seen as equally enjoyable to their previous incarnations, though some reviewers critiqued the return of timed stage rotations. Gabe Gurwin of Digital Trends praised the game's balance changes, including its reworked battle arenas he said compensate for the playstyles of multiple weapon classes. Brian Shea of Game Informer saw the alterations made to existing weapons as positive enhancements that improved their versatility. Rokurou Eyama of Automaton had mixed opinions on the balance adjustments, writing that while certain weapons in Splatoon were overtly powerful and thus needed to be weakened, he was concerned that these changes would result in a more "stale" and less exciting gameplay experience. Splatoon 2's visual presentation was commended as an improvement over that of Splatoon, generally attributed to the Switch's higher technical fidelity than the Wii U. Samuel Horti of GamesRadar+ felt that Splatoon 2 was generally lacking in innovation, feeling that its predecessor's core formula remained unchanged. This sentiment was shared by Neal Ronaghan of Nintendo World Report and Mollie L. Patterson of Electronic Gaming Monthly, both of whom thought the game felt "more like Splatoon 1.5" as opposed to a definitive sequel.

Most of Splatoon 2's wholly new additions were enjoyed. Patterson responded positively to Off the Hook, praising the duo's chemistry and songs. The game's single-player campaign was reviewed well; critics deemed its levels mechanically engaging and suitably enhanced from those of its predecessor. (Note: Attributed to multiple references:) While the new Salmon Run mode, considered Splatoon 2's standout addition, was praised for its difficulty and emphasis on team cooperation, (Note: Attributed to multiple references:) its time-sensitive availability was lamented, many critics finding the restriction illogical and at the mode's detriment. Brian Shea opined that "limiting such a substantial addition in this way is a baffling and frustrating decision," while Neal Ronaghan felt that "only being able to play [Salmon Run] at specific times is downright awful."

Many were displeased with the locking of voice chat behind the Nintendo Switch Online mobile app. Writing for The Verge, Andrew Webster felt the game's lack of built-in voice chat functionality needlessly complicated the multiplayer experience, a sentiment shared by Kallie Plagge of GameSpot. Brittany Vincent of Game Revolution and Will Greenwald of PCMag critiqued the process of creating lobbies through the app as cumbersome. IGN's Brendan Graeber disliked the app's user interface, criticizing that one's smartphone is required to be powered on to continue conversing. He found the app largely inferior to existing voice messaging services such as Discord and Skype. Additionally, The game's matchmaking system elicited criticism. Multiple reviewers derided the inability of players to switch weapon loadouts between matches at launch, which Alex Olney of Nintendo Life called "an oversight that is genuinely frustrating." Sam Machkovech of Ars Technica and Horti both disliked that the matchmaking menu could not be manually aborted.

=== Sales ===
Splatoon 2 debuted second on the UK software sales chart in its launch week, behind Crash Bandicoot N. Sane Trilogy (2017). It had 59% better first week sales than Splatoon and became the third biggest launch of a Switch game in that country. In Japan, Splatoon 2 sold roughly 670,955 copies at retail within the first few days of its launch. Including download copies, the game had sold over two million in Japan by early 2018, making it the first home console game to do so in the country since Wii Party (2010). The game shipped 1.56 million copies in Japan and 3.61 million copies worldwide in its first fiscal quarter on sale. By June 30, 2020, the game had sold 10.71 million copies worldwide, making it the ninth best-selling Switch game worldwide. As of December 31, 2022, Splatoon 2 had sold over 13.60 million copies worldwide, selling twice as much as its predecessor, and making it one of the best-selling Switch games.

=== Accolades ===
Eurogamer ranked the game 17th on their list of the "Top 50 Games of 2017", while Polygon ranked it 43rd on their list of the 50 best games of 2017. The Verge named Splatoon 2 as one of their 15 Best Games of 2017. The game was nominated for "Best Switch Game" in both Destructoid's Game of the Year Awards 2017 and IGN's Best of 2017 Awards, the latter of which also nominated it for "Best Shooter" and "Best Multiplayer".

List of awards and nominations
Year	Awards	Category	Result	Ref.
2017	Golden Joystick Awards	Best Multiplayer Game	Nominated	
2017	Golden Joystick Awards	Nintendo Game of the Year	Nominated	
2017	The Game Awards 2017	Best Family Game	Nominated	
2017	The Game Awards 2017	Best Multiplayer	Nominated	
2018	NAVGTR Awards	Animation, Technical	Nominated	
2018	NAVGTR Awards	Game, Franchise Family	Nominated	
2018	SXSW Gaming Awards	Excellence in Multiplayer	Nominated	
2018	14th British Academy Games Awards	Multiplayer	Nominated	
2018	Famitsu Awards	Excellence Prize	Won	
2018	CEDEC Awards	Game Design	Won	

== Sequel ==
On February 17, 2021, during a Nintendo Direct, Nintendo announced a teaser trailer for Splatoon 3, which was released for the Nintendo Switch on September 9, 2022. The teaser trailer revealed gameplay similar to that of Splatoon 2, and revealed new items, weapons, and a new apocalyptic setting.
