= Delgado =

Delgado is a Spanish and Portuguese surname originating from Latin delicatus, meaning 'delicate' or 'soft'. Notable people with the surname include:

- Adrián Delgado, Venezuelan actor
- Agustín Delgado (born 1974), Ecuadorian footballer
- Aidan Delgado, American conscientious objector and anti-war activist
- Alberto Delgado Pérez, Cuban footballer
- Alberto Delgado (jockey), American jockey
- Alex Delgado, Venezuelan baseball player
- Álvaro Delgado (footballer) (born 1995), Chilean footballer
- Álvaro Delgado (journalist) (born 1966), Mexican investigative journalist and author
- Álvaro Delgado (politician) (born 1969), Uruguayan politician and veterinarian
- Ángel Delgado (born 1994), Dominican Republic basketball player
- Anita Delgado, Spanish flamenco dancer
- Antonio Delgado, New York politician
- Antonio M. Delgado (before 1900–1936/1937), Puerto Rican mayor of Ponce
- Antonio C. Delgado (1917–1992), Philippine Ambassador to the Vatican
- Antonio Delgado (footballer) (1939–2022), Cape Verde-born Norwegian player
- Antonio Delgado Palomo (1957–2021), Spanish track and field Paralympian in 1976
- Ayax Delgado, Nicaraguan student activist
- Camilo Delgado, Puerto Rican television host
- Campo Elías Delgado Morales (1934–1986), Colombian spree killer
- Carlos Delgado (born 1972), Puerto Rican baseball player
- Carmenza Delgado, Colombian weightlifter
- César Delgado (born 1981), Argentine footballer
- Chiquinquirá Delgado (born 1972), Venezuelan actress
- Clarence Delgado (born 2004), Filipino teen actor
- Darío Delgado (disambiguation), multiple people
- Delgado (footballer), Portuguese footballer, full name José Manuel Mota Delgado
- Dimas Delgado, Spanish footballer
- Emilio Delgado (1940–2022), Mexican-American actor
- Fernando Eduardo Delgado, Venezuelan composer
- Fran Delgado (born 2001), Spanish footballer
- Francisco Afan Delgado, Philippine lawyer and politician
- Franco Delgado (born 2005), Uruguayan footballer
- Frank Delgado (born 1970), American keyboardist
- Frankie Delgado (born 1981), Mexican-American actor and producer
- Gabi Delgado-López, Spanish/German industrial musician
- Griselda Delgado del Carpio (born 1955), Bolivian bishop
- Humberto Delgado, Portuguese general
- Isaac Delgado, New Orleans philanthropist
- Issac Delgado (born 1962), Cuban musician
- James P. Delgado, Canadian maritime archaeologist
- Jamie Delgado, British tennis player
- José Raúl Delgado, Cuban baseball player
- Junior Delgado, Jamaican reggae star
- Lauro Delgado, Filipino actor
- Lorena Delgado Varas (born 1974), Swedish politician
- Lota Delgado, Filipina actress
- Luis Delgado (disambiguation), multiple people
- Luís Delgado, Angolan footballer
- Marcel Delgado, Mexican sculptor
- Marcelo Delgado, Argentine footballer
- Marijose Delgado (born 2011), Mexican rhythmic gymnast
- Martin Teofilo Delgado, Philippine revolutionary
- Matías Emilio Delgado (born 1982), Argentine footballer
- Nieves Delgado (born 1968), Spanish writer
- Noémia Delgado, Portuguese television and film screenwriter, film editor and director
- Paco Delgado, Spanish costume designer
- Patricia Delgado, American ballet dancer
- Pedro Delgado (born 1960), Spanish cyclist
- Ramón Delgado (born 1976), Paraguayan tennis player
- Raynel Delgado (born 2000), Cuban baseball player
- Rebeca Delgado (born 1966), Bolivian politician
- Rebekah Delgado, British singer-songwriter
- Richard Delgado (born 1939), American lawyer, legal educator and writer
- Ricardo Delgado (comics), Costa Rican comic book and animation artist
- Roger Delgado, British actor
- Silviano Delgado, Mexican footballer
- Trixi Delgado, German singer
- William Delgado (born 1956), American politician
- Yorgelis Delgado (1982–2026), Venezuelan actress

== Maternal family name ==
- José Miguel Arroyo Delgado, Spanish bullfighter
- Estuardo Díaz Delgado, Peruvian mayor
- Campo Elías Delgado, Colombian murderer
- José Ramos Delgado (1935–2010), Argentine footballer and manager
- José Manuel Rodriguez Delgado (1915–2011), Spanish scientist

== Fictional characters ==
- Manny Delgado, One of the main characters in Modern Family
- Gloria Delgado, One of the main characters in Modern Family
- Boman Delgado, fictional character from Rival Schools
- Dan Delgado, fictional character from The Others and The Infinite Timeline books by Jeremy Robinson
- Danny Delgado, fictional character from Power Rangers Wild Force
- Elena Delgado, fictional character from Without a Trace
- Elizabeth "Z" Delgado, fictional character from Power Rangers S.P.D.
- Hoss Delgado, fictional character from The Grim Adventures of Billy & Mandy
- Leo Delgado, fictional character from Inversion
- Marco Delgado (comics), a character from Marvel Comics
- Rico Delgado, fictional character from Hitman
- Susan Delgado (fictional character), character from The Dark Tower
- Yamato Delgado, character in Battle B-Daman anime
