= Super B-Daman: Battle Phoenix 64 =

1998 video game

- Developer: Hudson
- Publisher: Hudson
- Platform: Nintendo 64
- Release: JP: July 24, 1998
- Genre: Action
- Modes: Single player, multiplayer

Super B-Daman: Battle Phoenix 64 (Note: Japanese: スーパービーダマン バトルフェニックス64, Hepburn: Sūpā Bī Daman Batoru Fenikkusu Rokujūyon) is an action game for the Nintendo 64developed and published by Hudson Soft. It is based on the B-Daman toyline and franchise, and features characters from the Burst Ball Barrage!! Super B-Daman manga and anime. The game was released only in Japan in 1998.

== Gameplay ==
In Battle Phoenix 64, players compete in a variety of different minigames using their B-Daman. The game's main mode is B-DaMode, where players participate inn battle royale tournaments to unlock new characters and B-Daman, tag team tournaments featuring teams of players, or free matches where any minigame can be played casually. A battle mode allows up to four players to compete in traditional B-Daman battles.

An Item mode allows players to view new B-Daman they have earned through gameplay. Players can connect with the Game Boy game Super B-Daman: Fighting Phoenix (1997) via the Transfer Pak, allowing them to transfer B-Daman earned in that game.
