= Antonio Delgado (disambiguation) =

Antonio Delgado (born 1977) is the lieutenant governor of New York since 2022.

Antonio Delgado may also refer to:

- Antonio M. Delgado (before 1900–1936/1937), Puerto Rican mayor-elect of Ponce
- Antonio C. Delgado (1917–1992), Philippine Ambassador to the Vatican
- Antonio Delgado (footballer) (1939–2022), Cape Verdean-born Norwegian player
- Antonio Delgado (athlete) (1957–2021), Spanish track and field Paralympian in 1976
