= B-Daman Fireblast =

Japanese anime television series

クロスファイト ビーダマンeS (Kurosufaito Bīdaman eS)
- Genre: Action, adventure
- Manga
- Written by: Yoshinori Odaka
- Published by: Shogakukan
- Magazine: CoroCoro Comic
- Original run: 2012 – 2013
- Volumes: 1
- Anime television series
- Directed by: Yoshinori Odaka
- Studio: SynergySP
- Licensed by: NA: ADK Emotions NY, Inc.
- Original network: TXN (TV Tokyo)
- Original run: October 7, 2012 – September 29, 2013
- Episodes: 52
- Other series
- List of all B-Daman manga; List of all B-Daman TV series

B-Daman Fireblast, known in Japan as Cross Fight B-Daman eS (クロスファイト ビーダマンeS), is the second B-Daman anime series in the Crossfire saga, succeeding B-Daman Crossfire, and is based on the Emblem Charge System introduced in the toyline in September 2012. It premiered on October 7, 2012, after an airing of Beyblade: Shogun Steel at 8:45 JST on the TV Tokyo network. It was later moved to 8:30 JST following the conclusion of the Beyblade: Shogun Steel anime, and the introduction of the Beast Saga anime.

B-Daman Fireblast first launched internationally outside Japan in June 2014, in the country of Spain, followed by India, Germany and others. On March 27, 2015, B-Daman Fireblast was released in North America through a new app for iPhone and iPad, with an Android device release on April 13, 2015. The app upon release featured access to the first 9 episodes in English. Originally, the English dub was to be run by The CW's Saturday morning block Vortexx following the run of B-Daman Crossfire, but those plans never came into fruition as the block later ceased operations in September 2014.

== Plot ==
The new anime takes place in "Crest Land", set after the mysterious "B-Crystal" went berserk at the WBMA Headquarters. The main protagonist, Kamon Day, lives in the south area of Crest Land, and is an energetic boy who loves B-Daman. However, he lost his all past memories of B-Daman and his family, except for his big sister Aona who lives with him. One day, Kamon meets Garuburn, a B-Daman, at his local B-Daman shop, "B-Junk", and he finds Garuburn strangely familiar. Garuburn becomes his partner, and he returns to the B-Daman battles once again.

== Characters ==
=== Main characters ===
Kamon Godai (御代 カモン, Godai Kamon) / Kamon Day
Voiced by: Yasuaki Takumi (Japanese); Johnny Yong Bosch (CFE26); Reece Thompson (Fireblast) (English)
The Southern B-Master of Crest Land and younger brother of Aona and Roma. His B-Daman is Drive Garuburn.
Kagero Ogami (拝カゲロウ / 拝陽炎, Ogami Kagero) / Ken Ogami
Voiced by: Wataru Hatano (Japanese); David Kaye (English)
A Blacklist B-Shot, having had his qualification to compete in the Road Fight was revoked by Bakuga, and continued participating without authorization. His B-Daman is Detonate Wolg.
Misuru Hachuka (蜂須賀ミツル, Hachisuka Mitsuru)
Voiced by: Fumie Mizusawa (Japanese); Alex Bergen (English)
His B-Daman is Slot Stinger.
Subaru Shirogane (白銀 スバル, Shirogane Subaru) / Samuru Shigami
Voiced by: Sachi Kokuryu (Japanese); Jennifer Cameron (English)
His current B-Daman is Sonic Dravise, an upgrade from his previous Lightning Dravise.
Yukihide Washimura (鷲村ユキヒデ / 鷲村幸秀, Washimura Yukihide) / Yuki Washimura
Voiced by: Hiroshi Okamoto (Japanese); Aidan Drummond (English)
His current B-Daman is Across=Eagle, an upgrade from his previous Strike Avian.

=== Supporting characters ===
Aona Godai (御代アオナ, Godai Aona) / Aona Day
Voiced by: Natsumi Takamori (Japanese); Breanna O'Brien (English)
Kamon and Roma's older sister.
Gogyo Godai (御代ゴギョウ / 御代五行, Godai Gogyou) / Greg Day
Voiced by: Ken Narita (Japanese); Alex Zahara (English)
The father of Kamon, Aona, and Roma, and has reinvoled himself in Kamon's life to help him fulfill his destiny with the legendary B-Daman, Drive Garuburn.
Himiko Godai (御代ヒミコ, Godai Himiko) / Himiko Day
Voiced by: Ryōka Yuzuki
The matriarch of the Day family, being the wife of Greg, and the mother of Kamon, Aona, and Roma.

=== B-Masters ===
Byakuga Shiranui / Bakuga Shira
Voiced by: Akeno Watanabe (Japanese); Melissa Dorsey (English)
The B-Master of the Western Area of Crestland, and the hated arch-rival of Ken Ogami. His B-Daman is Kreis Raydra.
Genta Ankokuji (闇黒寺ゲンタ (あんこくじ ゲンタ), Ankokuji Genta) / Jenta Kokuji
Voiced by: Takuma Terashima (Japanese); Stewart Cummings (English)
The B-Master of the Northern Area of Crestland who was previously brainwashed by Ryoma until he lost to Kamon. His B-Daman is Dashing Tankshell.
Kakeru Ryugasaki (龍々崎カケル（りゅうがさき-）, Ryugasaki Kakeru) / Riki Ryugasaki
Voiced by: Momoko Ohara (Japanese); Cathy Weseluck (English)
The Crossfire Champion, having foiled Rudy and Smash=Dragold's planned world conquest with the help of Samuru, Novu, and Basara. He is also the B-Master of the Eastern Area of Crestland. His current B-Daman is Rising=Dracyan, an upgrade from his previous Thunder Dracyan.
Ryoma Godai (ごだいリョーマ, Godai Ryoma) / Ryoma Day
Voiced by: Tomoaki Maeno (Japanese); Jesse Inocalla (English)
The Grand B-Master of Crestland, and the middle child of the Day family, being Kamon and Aona's older and younger brother respectively. His B-Daman is Triple Gillusion.

=== Antagonists ===
Genya Ankokuji (闇黒寺ゲンヤ, Ankokuji Genya) / Genya Kokuji
Voiced by: Hideyuki Umezu (Japanese); Paul Cowling (English)
Known as Agent Dark, he is the one behind Triple=Gillusion's manipulation of Roma Day, the creation of the Road Fight, the hostile takeover of the Shira Corporation, and the development of the deadly Core System weapons. He is also the father of Jenta.
Hagataki (端敵, Hagataki)
Voiced by: TBA
The leader of the Master Guardians, and works under the Western B-Master, Bakuga Shira.
Akari Komyouji (光明寺アカリ, Komyouji Akari)
Voiced by:
Known as Agent Chaos while she was being controlled by Triple Gillusion, she is Ryoma's assistant.

=== Recurring Characters ===
Basara Kurofuchi (黒渕バサラ (くろふち), Kurofuchi Basara) / Basara Kurochi
Voiced by: Shinnosuke Tachibana (Japanese); Brad Swaile (English)
A Dragon B-Shot. His current B-Daman is Stream Drazeros, an upgrade from his previous Double Drazeros.
Saneatsu Tenpouin (天宝院実篤（てんぽういん さねあつ）, Tenpouin Saneatsu) / Grandpa Takakura
Voiced by: Yuzuru Fujimoto (Japanese); Alec Willows (English)
The head of the WBMA and Rory's grandfather.
Ouga Raidou (来堂オウガ, Raidou Ouga) / Hugo Raidoh
Voiced by: Kazuyuki Okitsu (Japanese); Michael Adamthwaite (English)
His current B-Daman is Jet=Leohjya, an upgrade from his previous Thunder Leo.
Naoya Homura (焔ナオヤ / 焔直哉(ほむら-), Homura Naoya) / Novu Moru
Voiced by: Chihiro Suzuki (Japanese); Cole Hanson (English)
His current B-Daman is Force Dragren, an upgrade from his previous Strike Dragren.
Ruri Tenpouin (天宝院ルリ / 天宝院瑠璃（てんぽういん-）, Tenpouin Ruri) / Rory Takakura
Voiced by: Yuki Kaida (Japanese); Nicole Oliver (English)
The granddaughter of Takakura. Her B-Daman is Steer=Swallow.
Katsumiya Shumon (蠍宮シュモン, Shumon Katsumiya) / Simon Sumiya
Voiced by: Mai Aizawa (Japanese); Patricia Bacchus (English)
His current B-Daman is Mach=Sasword, an upgrade from his previous Lightning Scorpio.
Natsumi Inaba (稲葉ナツミ, Inaba Natsumi) / Sumi Inaba
Voiced by: Megumi Takamoto
Her current B-Daman is Lightning Rabbit.
