= Bomberman B-Daman Bakugaiden =

Manga

ボンバーマン・ビーダマン爆外伝 (Bombāman Bī-daman Bakugaiden)
- Manga
- Written by: Koichi Mikata
- Published by: Shogakukan
- Magazine: CoroCoro Comic
- Original run: April 1, 1997 – February 24, 1999
- Volumes: 4
- Anime television series
- Directed by: Nobuaki Nakanishi
- Produced by: Toshinori Yokoyama; Satoshi Yoshimoto; Fumiko Manabe; Mami Ohara
- Written by: Tatsuhiko Urahata
- Studio: Madhouse d-rights
- Original network: ANN (Nagoya TV, TV Asahi)
- Original run: February 7, 1998 – January 31, 1999
- Episodes: 48
- Video game

Bomberman B-Daman Bakugaiden: The Road to Victory
- Developer: Hudson Soft
- Publisher: Media Factory
- Genre: Role-Playing Game
- Platform: Game Boy Color
- Released: January 29, 1999
- Other series
- List of all B-Daman manga; List of all B-Daman TV series

Bomberman B-Daman Bakugaiden (ボンバーマン・ビーダマン爆外伝, Bombāman Bī-daman Bakugaiden), commonly abbreviated as BB-Daman Bakugaiden (Bビーダマン爆外伝) or BBB, is a CoroCoro Comic series created by Koichi Mikata, based on Bomberman and B-Daman. An animated television series was created and originally broadcast on Nagoya TV and TV Asahi at 17:00. It was also broadcast internationally on Taiwan Television (Taiwan), TVB Jade (Hong Kong) and Spacetoon (Arab world)

The series was superseded by Bomberman B-Daman Bakugaiden V.

== Plot ==
One thousand years ago, the B-da City was attacked by the Dark B-da in their quest to control the entire Blue Solar System. The B-Daman, drawing on their power and technology, restored peace.

The setting is similar to Bakugaiden III toys, but with slight changes.

The episode generally revolves around the five main characters: White, Blue, Red, Yellow, and Black "Bombers". Each get better, newer, and stronger machines or battle suits as the series progress. Each battle is either with a henchman or one of the four great bosses. Each one of them has a unique quirk. This is generally part of how the team beats them. With each Battle Suit, a new villain arrives and defeats them, forcing them to adjust their personality, or get a stronger weapon.

== Characters ==
=== Battle suits ===
Note: This refers to the Beda City story starting from episode 3 of this series.

==== First generation ====
White Gale
White Bomber was the first one to get his Battle Suit. It was capable of Flight, thus making it the most mobile and useful. He first got it accidentally when he met Professor. This suit is the only one of the first set that has flight capabilities. The toy version of this suit has two modes: Speed mode which focuses on firing and attack and Wing mode which has the capability to fly in the air. Main attack is "Beda Cannon" which has rapid-firing capabilities to a certain extent. Was heavily damaged by Hogane Dragon Suit (piloted by Draken, one of the Four Dark Lords) during battle in which was upgraded to a better suit to fight him.
Blue Sniper
Blue Bomber's suit is one of the three which can only operate on land. The special feature if this suit is its retractable targeter which can help target enemies for shooting and it has an incredibly long range of fire. Its attack and defence is average and is considered a base for the other two machines built later on. He was the second one to get a suit after the White Bomber. Made specifically for precision shooting, its main attack is "Pointing Shot".
Red Buster
Red Bomber got hers, shortly after Blue's. Her suit's strength lies in the ability to fire two Beda shots at once, which made it the Beda suit with the most power (before Yellow Bomber got his though). Main attack is "Double Beda Cannon".
Yellow Shooter
Yellow Bomber's suit was based on similar designs to Red's. So basically they're twins. Because it was a later model, it took more time to develop, making it the last one to surface. But this led to Yellow getting upset, and falling under a spell of a minion. He then operated an enemy suit, and was cured eventually. But in the end, he got his own. It has the strongest attack power, but has the weakest defense and armor. Main attack is "Drive Shot" which shoots a powerful Beda roller (stronger than what White Dale has) ball right at the opponents. Heavily damaged while in its maiden battle with the Four Dark Lords.
Black Gattlinger
Black Bomber's initial suit is one of the older designs and does not have much capabilities except that it can fire a gatling of Beda shots (called the "Gatling Shot") that hit opponents' armours. While this is effective against the minion suits, it is proven useless against the suits of the Four Dark Lords themselves. It was destroyed by Draken's Hogane Dragon when it fired at the gattling part of the suit. Note that this suit does not have a capsule cockpit system unlike the rest of them in the first set.
White Gale II
After White Gale is defeated by the Hogane Dragon, the other bombers helped it retreat to the lab for repair and upgrades. The whole system goes through a re-upgrade while White Bomber is unconscious inside the cockpit. While Draken is out in the sky above the lab blasting it to pieces they slowly completed this upgrade for White Bomber to wake up and head for battle in his new upgraded suit. White Gale II has improvements in flight speed and shooting ability. Its new attack is called "Metal Beda Cannon" which fires a powerful sniper-based shot right at Draken's Hogane Dragon, causing it to explode and Draken retreats back into space in defeat.

==== Second generation ====
The first set is destroyed in a train accident caused deliberately by Tiger's apprentice. This accident caused the carriage which contains three of the suits to fall off a steep cliff. The Bombers were inside at that time and survived by escaping the falling carriage, but the four suits - White Gale II, Blue Sniper, Yellow Shooter, and Red Buster go down into the sea together with it.

Black Cluster
Black Bomber's second suit. This time it features a capsule cockpit like the other suits. Has high re-loading capabilities coupled with powerful rapid-fire shots. Was destroyed by the Dark Prince's Blizzard Dragon suit after the Four Dark Lords were all defeated by the other bombers. Black Cluster is stronger than the other bombers. Its main attack is the "Cluster Cannon". It first appeared in episode 19.
White Blows (White Gale 3)
White Bomber's newest suit is a complete redesign of the Beda Armour system. The specs far surpasses its two predecessors and its main attack "Blows Cannon" allows it to rapid-fire Beda Blasts that exceeds those of White Gale II thanks to its Beda Multiplier loading system giving it superiority in both firing power and speed. This can combine with the other two suits built later to form a powerful Beda suit. The toy version has a marking on its forehead above the sensor that reads "WHITE GALE III".
Blue Braiver
Blue Bomber's newest suit now has the ability to fly just like what White Bomber's suits has always been capable of. Features an improved navigation and targeting system previously developed from the design of Blue Sniper for extreme-precision and long-ranged shots with the addition of an X-Ray sensor for detecting cloaked enemy units. Its Main Attack is "Brave Cannon". Made its debut at episode 23.
Yellow Crusher

Yellow Bomber's new suit has the same power as its predecessor and is equipped with an additional sonar speaker and has the ability to fly thanks to the rear boosters that come inbuilt. Yellow Bomber was able to use it to tremble Shuringe's suit, Tsubasa Phoenix, using the sound waves created which can also deflect the Beda shots that is fired towards it, and this new suit subsequently plays a part in defeating it. Its Main Shot is the "Crusher Cannon" that contains both offensive and defensive in nature. It makes its debut on episode 22.

Black Devaster
Black Bomber's newest suit is the largest in size among all the Bomber's suits and can transform to a dragon for flight. This is the only Bomber suit which has dual Beda barrels for double the power. Has the capability to combine with the Saint Blaster to form the ultimate Beda suit to defend Beda City. It makes its debut on episode 37.
Flyer Dragon
Red Bomber's dragon-type suit is mainly used as a carrier suit for two Beda suits to park on when its storage hatch opens in Ride mode. It fires B-Da shots catapult-style. It makes its debut on episode 45.
Blizzard Dragon
Dark Prince's suit. It can change its shape from a normal suit to a dragon-like suit within a matter of seconds. The suit's main attack is Blizzard Cannon.

==== Combined forms ====
Saint Blaster
This suit is combined using White Blows, Blue Braiver and Yellow Crasher. White Blows forms the head, body and arms of the combined suit while the other two suits forms the legs. Its battle power can be evenly matched with the Dark Prince's "Blizzard Abel", and fires with its Combined Main Shot "Blaster Cannon".
Saint Dragon
This ultimate suit is the combination of the four second set suits above. White Blows form the Dragon Head and upper body, Black Devaster forms the main body and wings, Blue Braiver and Yellow Crasher forms the legs of the ultimate suit. This is featured in the 2nd opening and the final episode of the series in which they defeated the dark dragon using the finisher attack "Saint Fire Volley".

=== Villains ===
Koutei
An evil being in the form of a giant eye monster. Plans to take over the world.
Dark Prince (ダークプリンス, Dāku Purinsu)
Black Bomber's twin brother, Jack. A long time ago, Professor Brown sneaked into Professor Sage's lab in the desert in search for secret plans and designs. Jack saw him while he was searching for a baseball that seemingly crashed through his window, but was kidnapped and turned into evil. Black Bomber and his friends eventually saved him and turned him good again. As the Dark Prince, he makes his debut in episode 35 and appears in almost every other episode up until episode 48. He was voiced in the anime by Nobutoshi Canna.
Professor Brown/Dr. Shadow
Dr. Gray Bomber's peer, and Professor Sage's student. He was jealous of Dr. Gray Bomber's superiority (or so he says) and joined the darkness. He creates Battle Suits, using knowledge from Professor Sage's lessons, and eventually becomes a key role in the darkness.
Momite Bomber (モミテボン, Momitebon)

A useless minion of darkness who provides the comic relief throughout the series. He is given the name "Momite" for the fact that he often rubs his hands together nervously. He claims to be a good guy, but actually is not. Similarly to how Blue Bomber says "desu" at the end of every sentence, Momite Bomber says "dayo". His main purpose is to spy on the Good Bombers. He was voiced in the anime by Koyasu Takehito.

Minions
Each dark lord has their minions. Whether they be expert spies, assassins, recons, they all try to defeat the Bomber Heroes. Usually, they get beaten half to death before they get their battle suits, and they get gagged unintentionally by the heroes.
Draken (ドラーケン, Dorāken)
He has EGO problems, and enjoys having minions make him long and honoring titles. Usually, Lacky Bomber makes one with numerous "supers", "ultras", and "oh greats". Defeated at the hands of one of White Bomber's new suits, upgraded with Yellow Bomber's help. His suit, "Hogane Dragon", has the ability to fire two metal Beda shots at once when the mouth opens. He was voiced in the anime by Kunihiko Yasui.
Tiger (ティーゲル, Tīgeru)
A strong villain, but he has 1 flaw-His Suits use up enormous amounts of energy. A battle usually ends with him running out of energy, but he seems to always have the upper hand. His end was when the overlord had enough of his incompetence, and jailed him. His suit, "Kurogane Byakko", has a normal metal Beda shooter and a small one on the head which can be fired separately. He was voiced in the anime by Hideyuki Hori.
Shuringe (シュリンゲ)
A female villain, who goes incognito as a pretty woman. Dr. Gray Bomber falls head over heels for her. She has an issue with people mispronouncing her name. She poses as a teacher with amnesia. In the end, she loses to an upgraded team of White, Blue, Yellow, and Black Bomber. She often comes out of her armor as a full-grown Bomber called Ms. Purple (パープルさん, Pāpuru-san), but Dr. Gray Bomber never learns who she really is. Her suit "Tsubasa Phoenix" has immense firepower, having a total of six Beda shooters altogether. Can transform into flying bird mode. She was voiced in the anime by Rica Matsumoto.
Sildork (シルドーク, Shirudōku)
He is jailed for rebelling against the lord himself. Craving battles, he does not spare any heroes unless they give him a good fight. His quote is "You're not strong enough to be worthy of me killing you". In the end, the characters never beat him, but injure him enough so that he retreats. However, he ends up coming back stronger than ever. He nearly kills them, admitting them as strong, but leaves to fight the Evil Lord. His suit "Yorui Turtle" has insanely high defense and normal shots cannot penetrate its powerful armour. The most devastating attack is when it opens its head and fires a large and powerful ball of Beda energy from it. But this is also where its weak spot is as this firing spot is just above the cockpit of the suit itself. The suit can transform into an armoured turtle capable of swimming in the water. Voiced in the anime by Yosuke Akimoto.
Dr. Crusher (Dr.クラッシャー, Dr. Kurasshā)
A villain appearing in the first 3 episodes. He looks very similar to that of Professor Brown. Voiced in the anime by Nishimura Tomohiro.

=== Major characters ===
White Bomber/Bomberman (しろボン, Shirobon)
Leader of the Good Bombers. He is determined, but can be a bit childish sometimes and has a strong sense of courage. He was voiced in the anime by Houko Kuwashima.
Blue Bomber (あおボン, Aobon)
A mechanical genius, but very anxious, shy and docile, especially around girls. He has a secret crush on Red Bomber, and has a habit of saying "desu" at the end of every sentence. He was voiced in the anime by Etsuko Kozakura.
Red Bomber (あかボン, Akabon)
The only female of the Good Bombers. She wears a yellow bow on her antenna, and has been in love with Black Bomber ever since he saved her life. She has a rivalry with Yellow Bomber and Pink Bomber. She was voiced in the anime by Rei Sakuma.
Yellow Bomber (きいろボン, Kiirobon)
A greedy Bomber who dreams of wealth and meeting many pretty girls. Yellow Bomber is jealous of Black Bomber and has a rivalry with Red Bomber and White Bomber. He was voiced in the anime by Mitsuaki Madono.
Black Bomber (くろボン, Kurobon)
A mysterious fighter who shows up to help the heroes and disappears when his help is no longer needed. He wears a cape and has a long-lost twin brother called Jack, who was kidnapped by Koutei. He was voiced in the anime by Toshihiko Seki.
Dr. Gray Bomber (Dr.グレイボン, Dr. Gureibon)
Blue Bomber's grandfather, and inventor of the robots that the good Bombers pilot. He was voiced in the anime by Tsukui Kyosei.
Green Bomber (みどりボン, Midoribon)
Voiced in the anime by Kappei Yamaguchi.
Light Blue Bomber (みずいろボン, Mizuirobon)
Voiced in the anime by Issei Miyazaki.

=== Minor characters ===
Pink Bomber (ピンクボン, Pinkubon)
Another female outside of the Bomber Team. She is a very rich and beautiful girl who lives with her father, Rich Bomber (リッチボン, Ricchibon), and appears to have a crush on White Bomber, but later falls in love with Black Bomber instead. She has a rivalry with Red Bomber, who is also in love with him. She was voiced in the anime by Hiroko Konishi.
Jack (ジャック, Jakku)
Black Bomber's twin brother. He was kidnapped and possessed by Koutei after going into the lab to get a baseball. Black bomber and his friends eventually safely restored him to being good again. Unlike his brother Black Bomber, he is very happy and playful. He was voiced in the anime by Nobutoshi Canna.
Golden Bomber/Dark Bomber (ゴールデンボン/ダークボン, Gōrudenbon/Dākubon)
White Bomber's father, possessed by evil. After a battle with the evil Koutei, he was turned good once more. He was the king, but his son White Bomber exceeded him and took the crown. Appears in the first three episodes of the series. He was voiced in the anime by Tesshō Genda.

=== One-time characters ===
Ceres (セレス, Seresu)
Voiced in the anime by Keiichi Sonobe.
Pallas (パラス, Parasu)
Voiced in the anime by Takehiro Murozono.
Navy Blue Bomber (こんボン, Konbon)
Appears in the second episode. He looks very similar to that of Blue Bomber. Voiced in the anime by Jūrōta Kosugi.
Orange Bomber (オレンジボン, Orenjibon)
Appears in the first episode, training White Bomber. Voiced in the anime by Nagashima Yuichi.

=== B-Daron (animals) ===
Wind Bird (カゼ丸, Kazemaru)
White Bomber's B-Daron; a turquoise bird. He has a sweet tooth for cake, and comes to White Bomber's aid whenever he needs to go somewhere. His ability is Hurricane Shot. He is voiced in the anime by Yuuichi Nagashima.
Rui-rui (ルイルイ)
Blue Bomber's B-Daron; a pink rabbit. Rui-rui is a genius, just like Blue Bomber and his grandfather are, and often works on computers to assist them. His ability is Lock-On. He was voiced in the anime by Tomoko Kawakami.
Pi-po (ピポ)
Red Bomber's B-Daron; an orange squirrel. She likes to hang with Red Bomber and help her with the things she does, such as baking delicious cakes for the gang. Her ability is Cheering.
Ponycorn (ポニコーン, Ponikōn)
Yellow Bomber's B-Daron. He is a horse that has a corn cob on his head, making him look like a Unicorn. He is almost always seen with Yellow Bomber and is usually involved in whatever he does. His ability is Corn Flash. He was voiced in the anime by Keiichi Sonobe.
Fire Dragon (ヒリュー, Hiryū)
Black Bomber's B-Daron; a purple dragon. He often goes into town, wearing a trench coat and a hat to disguise himself, so he can do certain tasks for Black Bomber. He looks very powerful, but is actually friendly, innocent and harmless, and would not even hurt a fly. His ability is Dragon Breath. He was voiced in the anime by Kunihiko Yasui.

== Episodes ==
1. The Legend of the B-Da Heroes (part 1): written by Shōji Yonemura
2. The Legend of the B-Da Heroes (part 2): written by Shōji Yonemura
3. Fly! White Gale: written by Seishi Minakami
4. The Arrogant Warrior, Black Bomber: written by Seishi Minakami
5. A Dark Messenger Arrives: written by Seishi Minakami
6. Fire Away! Blue Sniper: written by Seishi Minakami
7. Protecting the Forest's B-Daron: written by Takao Nitta
8. Dr. Gray Bomber's Super Inventions: written by Takao Nitta
9. Don't Die! Rui Rui: written by Seishi Minakami
10. Black Bomber's Secret: written by Seishi Minakami
11. Draken of the Four Dark Lords Arrives: written by Takao Nitta
12. Rise Up! White Gale II: written by Takao Nitta
13. Tempestuous Princess, Pink Bomber!: written by Seishi Minakami
14. The Second of the Four Dark Lords, Tiger: written by Seishi Minakami
15. Mystery of the Stormy Night: written by Tomoyasu Okubo
16. The Lone Hero: written by Seishi Minakami
17. Don't Cry, Wind Bird: written by Hideo Takayashiki
18. Discovery! Secret of the Labyrinth!?: written by Seishi Minakami
19. Go! Black Cluster: written by Seishi Minakami
20. Tiger's Doomsday: written by Tomoyasu Okubo
21. Mysterious Beauty, Miss Purple Appears: written by Seishi Minakami
22. Roar! Yellow Crasher: written by Seishi Minakami
23. Move Out! Blue Braver: written by Tomoyasu Okubo
24. Red Bomber's Dream, the Prima Donna: written by Seishi Minakami
25. Shuringe's Evil Trap: written by Tomoyasu Okubo
26. Dr. Gray Bomber's Spectacular Marriage Proposal: written by Seishi Minakami
27. Goodbye, Miss Purple: written by Tomoyasu Okubo
28. S.S. Pink Princess's Big Disaster: written by Tsutomu Kaneko
29. Sildork - The Great Dark Being's Rebellion: written by Toshiki Inoue
30. Red Bomber's Heart Gets Stolen!?: written by Toshiki Inoue
31. Momite Bomber's Day of Dignity: written by Seishi Minakami
32. Sildork Returns!?: written by Toshiki Inoue
33. Abused Control of White Blose: written by Toshiki Inoue
34. The Legend of the B-Stone: written by Toshiki Inoue
35. The Prince of Darkness Appears: written by Toshiki Inoue
36. The Strongest Enemy, Dark Prince: written by Seishi Minakami
37. Tiger and Shuringe's Counterattack: written by Tomoyasu Okubo
38. Duel! Draken VS. Sildork: written by Seishi Minakami
39. A Cursed Yellow Bomber: written by Daisuke Aranishi
40. Frozen Monstrosity, Icekenstein: written by Tomoyasu Okubo
41. Wind Bird, Come Back!: written by Seishi Minakami
42. Black Bomber's Present: written by Seishi Minakami
43. Combine! Saint Blaster: written by Tomoyasu Okubo
44. The Scroll of Destiny: written by Seishi Minakami
45. The True Tale of Black Bomber's Past: written by Seishi Minakami
46. Dark Prince's True Self: written by Tomoyasu Okubo
47. Darkness Dragon Attacks!: written by Tomoyasu Okubo
48. The Final Battle! Light Saint Dragon Emerges: written by Seishi Minakami

== Video game ==
A Game Boy Color RPG titled Bomberman B-Daman Bakugaiden: The Road to Victory (ボンバーマンビーダマン爆外伝 ビクトリーへのみち, Bombāman Bī-Daman Bakugaiden: Bikutorī he no Michi; lit. 'Bomberman Marbleman Explosive Side Story: The Road to Victory') was created by Media Factory on January 29, 1999.
