= Berkhart =

Berkhart may refer to:

- Benjamin Berkhart, a fictional character in the television series The Time Tunnel
- Berkhart (Battle B-Daman), a fictional character in the anime and manga series Battle B-Daman
- Daniel Berkhart, a Marvel Comics supervillain
