= Crash B-Daman =

Television series

爆球Hit! クラッシュビーダマン (Bakukyū Hitto! Kurasshu Bīdaman)
- Manga
- Written by: Tomoya Kuratani
- Published by: Shogakukan
- Magazine: CoroCoro Comic
- Original run: January 2006 – March 2007
- Volumes: 3
- Anime television series
- Directed by: Yoshiaki Okumura
- Written by: Sukehiro Tomita; Jeong Eun Ho
- Music by: Kazuhiro Yamahara
- Studio: Synergy SP
- Original network: TXN (TV Tokyo)
- Original run: 9 January 2006 – 25 December 2006
- Episodes: 50
- Other series
- List of all B-Daman manga; List of all B-Daman TV series

Bakukyuu Hit! Crash B-Daman (Japanese: 爆球Hit! クラッシュビーダマン, Hepburn: Bakukyū Hitto! Kurasshu Bīdaman) is a manga series written and illustrated by Tomoya Kuratani, first serialized in the January 2006 issue of Coro Coro Comic. It is the fifth installment in Takara Tomy's B-Daman toy franchise. The television series started on 9 January 2006, replacing Battle B-Daman on TV Tokyo. It was the last television series of B-Daman until B-Daman Crossfire was announced on 3 June 2011.

== Story ==
Hitto Tamaga living on his own after his father had gone missing. He receives his first Crash B-Daman, Magnum Ifit, a B-Daman that was made by his own father as his birthday present. Holding this message from his father in his heart, Hitto grew up as he meet many friends, rivals, and enemies along his journey. He also began to uncover the truth about his missing father.

The anime and manga follows a different storyline.

== Characters ==
Hitto Tamaga (玉賀必人, Tamaga Hitto)
Voiced by: Kahoru Sasajima
In the anime, he is a strong person that never gives up and willing to face any obstacles in life. His favorite phrase is "overcome the difficulties", a message which was left by his missing father. Though unskilled and can be a bit reckless at times, he owns a burning, passionate spirit when it comes to B-Daman battles. His favorite food is chilli dog. He receives a B-Daman on his birthday, which was made and sent by father himself. He is also wearing a hair-clip which belongs to his father. He loses the B-1 Crash Cup tournament in the final round, but won the World Crash Grandprix and the East VS West B-Battle Festival in Hell Island, as a part of the East village team. He also joins the national B-1 Crash Cup, but the tournament was cancelled due to Saionji Konzern's interruption. Around the end of the anime series, he became one of the Seven Legendary B-Ders and faces Saionji Konzern's War Weapon along with the Seven Legendary B-Ders, fought with Kyousuke Arasaki in a 1-vs-1 battle, and gains victory. He reunites with his father in the end of the anime series.
In the manga, he owns a strong eyesight. He always tries to help the villagers to find anything missing with his eyesight, but requires money as a reward. His favorite food is grilled onigiri. On his birthday, his father made and gift him a B-Daman and got kidnapped when Hitto was not at home. To save his father, he entered the tournament held by Evil Gods organization, and discovers that he is the true successor of Evil Gods organization and possess the Evil Gods crest around his arms, legs and forehead. He defeated Shō in the end and reunites with his father the others after the Evil Gods castle was collapsed.
Kodoh Kuraki (蔵木コドウ, Kuraki Kodō)
Voiced by: Urara Takano
In the anime, he is one of the Four Kings in Saionji Konzern's Dark Lizards. He loves beautiful things and have a deep hatred for things that are "not beautiful". A very strong B-Der himself, but he is the type that rather be alone instead of making friends. His personality is also very cold, but he can be a bit nice at times when he's helping Hitto, but he never admits his generosity. He won the B-1 Crash Cup tournament, but surprises the audiences by shooting the trophy after receiving it. In the Crash World Grandprix, he enters the semi-finals and fought Hitto, but he surrender himself in the end, without entering the finals. Later in the story, he started to rebel against Saionji Konzern, and helped Hitto to save his father. It is revealed that he is one of the Seven Legendary B-Ders, which surprised the others.
In the manga, he is an assassin and one of the eight successors of the Evil Gods organization. Unlike the anime, he is 13 years old. Have an Evil Gods crest on his upper left arm. He often interrupts Kyousuke when Teruma gets bullied, and this shows that Kodoh actually have a soft side despite being an assassin. He was an orphan ever since he was younger, and often felt lonely, but in the end, he was adopted by Tycoon Shō and was trained to become an assassin. He has the same past in the anime, but he was adopted by two agents from Saionji Konzern instead and became a part of Dark Lizards. After the castle of Evil Gods organization was collapsed to the sea, Kodoh lives with Hitto along with Teruma and Hitto's father.
Nana Sendo (仙堂ナナ, Sendō Nana)
Voiced by: Akemi Kanda
An original anime character that only appears in the anime adaptations, replacing her manga counterpart Mamoru Matoba. A daughter of Hitto's landlord, and also Hitto's cousin. Often seen with Hitto and owns a pretty bossy personality. She does not have much interest in B-Dabattles even though she does own a custom B-Daman, so she never participated in any tournaments except for the East VS West B-Battle Festival in Hell Island, as a part of the East village team. She is also bad at shooting and aiming in B-Daman. She have a strange style of twintails, with a long hair at the right side and short hair at the left side. Ever since she was younger, she loves listening to her grandfather reading a storybook titled "The Seven Legendary B-Ders", and after knowing from Hitto's father that the Seven Legendary B-Ders exists, she always tries to find or guess who is the next Seven Legendary B-Ders, which turns to be Hitto and his friends. Though she was a bit disappointed that she was not one of them.
Konta Tsukino (月野コン太, Tsukino Konta)
Voiced by: Misato Fukuen
In the anime, he claims himself as a "B-Daman Hunter", a B-Der that hunts for strong B-Ders to fought with. He is a calm person that never rushes at all when B-dabattling. Calls Hitto as a "gacha-gacha" (「ガチャガチャ」, roughly means "clatter"), though not many people understand the meaning of what he's trying to imply. He often gets tired of Hitto's reckless personality. He is afraid of dogs, high places and his 3 older sisters. He was in the semi-finals of B-1 Crash Cup and World Crash Grandprix, but was defeated by Kodoh in the B-1 Crash Cup, and Daizo in the World Crash Grandprix and thus, he was unable to enter the finals. He also entered the East VS West B-Battle Festival in Hell Island, as a part of the East village team and the national B-1 Crash Cup which was cancelled due to Saionji Konzern's interruptions. He has always been with Hitto together to defeat the War Weapon created by Saionji Konzern. He is also one of the Seven Legendary B-Ders.
In the manga, he is the leader of a gang named "Bloodies" and challenges Hitto while Hitto and Mamoru was trapped by the other member of Bloodies. He owns a mischievous and unpredictable personality which differs from the anime adaptions'. Sometimes wear a cap on his head. His hobby is strolling around the moonlit night.
Jubee Sanada (真田銃兵衛, Sanada Jūbee)
Voiced by: Rikiya Koyama, Sachi Matsumoto (young)
In the anime, he fought B-Dabattles in an honorable manner and a fair way. Fights in his own pace and is very good at aiming. His biggest weakness was he can easily panic and ca not swim. Was in the semi-finals of B-1 Crash Cup, but loses to Hitto. He participated in the World Crash Grandprix along with the others but he had to drop himself out of the tournament due to injuries. He also entered the East VS West B-Battle Festival in Hell Island, as a part of the East village team and the national B-1 Crash Cup which was cancelled due to Saionji Konzern's interruptions. One of the Seven Legendary B-Ders. Also fought alongside Hitto until the end to defeat Saionji Konzern's War Weapon.
In the manga, he was a good friend of Konta, and was amazed by Hitto's Magnum Ifrit. He became friends with Hitto after they fought in a B-Dabattle and sometimes become Hitto's training coach. His hairstyle in the manga differs from the anime. According to a post from the manga-ka's blog, Kuratani Tomoya, his name is a reference to Yagyu Jubei Mitsuyoshi and Yukimura Sanada.
Karashu (カラッシュ, Karashū)
Voiced by: Yoshiro Matsumoto
Jubee's pet crow. Like a dog, he can detect a person's location by their smell. His name seems to be a play on the Japanese pronunciation of the word "Crash" and the Japanese word for crow, "Karasu".
Teruma Kamioka (神岡テルマ, Kamioka Teruma)
Voiced by: Hiroshi Kamiya (eps 4-34, 50), Kenji Nojima (eps 38-47)
In the anime, he may seem like a kind-hearted and gentle teenager who takes cares of the children in the orphanage, but since he has a split personality, he can change his personality into an evil person who is trying to steal B-Damans, along with an evil laughter, known as "Devil B-Der". His split personality is often called the "angel" side and the "devil" side. He is often change personality when he is B-Dabattling or when his "angel" side got nauseous when riding boats. It was revealed that his real personality is his "angel" side. He was disqualified in the first round in B-1 Crash Cup because of his "devil" side cheating when battling with Jubee. In the World Crash Grandprix, he was defeated by Joe in the first round. Also participated in the East VS West B-Battle Festival in Hell Island, but as a part of the West village team instead. He did not participate in the national B-1 Crash Cup, but appeared for a while around the tournament battling with Kodoh. After gained his true heart, he was the last to join Hitto as the Seven Legendary B-Ders to destroy the War Weapon by Saionji Konzern, and this surprises Nana a lot.
In the manga, he does not have any split personality unlike the anime. He is a very gentle and nice person, and he was Hitto's house helper and "student". Calls Hitto as his "master", but Hitto dislikes it. He is one of the members Evil Gods organization with an Evil Gods crest behind his neck and often got bullied by Kyousuke, which results to countless wounds on his body. He betrayed and left the Evil Gods organization after he did not want to steal Hitto's Magnum Ifrit, even though Kodoh ordered him to. He lives with Hitto, Hitto's father and Kodoh after the Evil Gods organization's castle was collapsed to the sea.
Daizō Oka (岡大蔵, Oka Daizō)
Voiced by: Eiji Takemoto
Anime-only character. One of the Four Kings in Saionji Konzern's Dark Lizards. A hot-blooded B-Der who prefers destroying things with his B-Daman rather than uses it in battles, yet he still fought battles in an honor. It is implied that he died falling from the Crash Tower after his final battle with Hitto during the final round of World Crash Grandprix.
Hanpei Takeichi (竹市伴平, Takeichi Hanpei)
Voiced by: Sayaka Aida
Anime-only character. One of the Four Kings in Saionji Konzern's Dark Lizards. In order to persuade Hitto to join Dark Lizard, he pretended to be a big fan of him. Despite his physical body and innocent looks, he is actually quite strong and haughty, and succeeded in his plans of kidnapping Prof. Tamaga and Prof. Trigger. At the quarter-final of World Crash Grand Prix, he won against his match with Darami but was fell off the cliff along with Darami, and later saved by Darami's maids.
Princess Darami (プリンセス・ダラミ)
Voiced by: Saori Yumiba
Anime-only character. The fourth Four King in Saionji Konzern's Dark Lizards. A rich woman who's always accompanied by her two maids. She is the only custom B-Daman user (which was made by Prof. Trigger, as ordered by Darami herself) among the Four Kings. Most of her battles consists her battling against Teruma. At the quarter-final of World Crash Grand Prix, she lost against her match with Hanpei but she later clings onto Hanpei on the battle arena, making both of them fell off the cliff, but later saved by Darami's maids.
Joe Fukairi (深入ジョー, Fukairi Jō)
Voiced by: Mamoru Miyano
Only appears in the anime adaptation. He is a fatalist, a person that have a huge beliefs in fates and often says the phrase "this is also fate". He joined the World Crash Grandprix and defeated Teruma in the first round, but he end up being injured and have to drop himself from the tournament. He fell in love at first sight with a nurse named Maria (Voiced by: Aya Sawano) when he was being treated for his injuries. He reunites with Hitto before the national B-1 Crash Cup starts, and proposes to Maria. He participated the cancelled national B-1 Crash Cup. After that, as one of the Seven Legendary B-Ders, he joins Hitto and the others to destroy the War Weapon by Saionji Konzern.
Kaito Namihira (波平海人, Namihira Kaito)
Voiced by: Mayumi Asano
Another character who only appears in the anime adaptation. He calls Hitto as "the friend of the sea". His father is a fisherman. He joins the B-1 Crash Cup but loses to Hitto in the 2nd round. Later, he also joined the national B-1 Crash Cup, which was cancelled. He is another Seven Legendary B-Ders that joins Hitto to destroy the War Weapon by Saionji Konzern.
Kōtarō Tamaga (玉賀光太郎, Tamaga Kōtarō)
Voiced by: Shuma Shiratori
Hitto's father. A B-Daman researcher known as "Professor Tamaga". In the anime, after he read an old book that he found somewhere, he suddenly went missing without any sign the next day. He sent a box with Magnum Ifrit inside it for Hitto's birthday, along with a letter that ends with the phrase "overcome the difficulites". He later send another letter in the middle of the series, and the letter made Hitto started on his journey. After Hitto found him, he gave a new B-Daman to Hitto and went missing again. He appears again and gave a new B-daman to Konta, but later, he was kidnapped by Dark Lizards and told Jubee to find his new B-Daman in the north. He was saved by Kodoh later, but in order to save Kodoh, he surrenders himself to the Saionji Konzern and gave new B-Damans to Kodoh. He and Prof. Trigger was forced by Saionji Konzern to create a strong B-Daman to destroy the world. In the end, he escaped along with Prof. Trigger from Saionji Konzern and reunites with Hitto.
In the manga, he spends his money for his B-Daman researches. He made and gifted Magnum Ifrit to Hitto, and when Hitto was not at home, his house got destroyed and he got kidnapped by the Evil Gods organization. He was seen in the jail of Evil Gods organization's castle. He was bombed and killed by Tycoon Shō when Hitto was battling with Kyousuke. The truth revealed, the one that was in jail and got "killed" was not Kōtarō, but it was a doll that was made to look like him. He actually escaped himself from being kidnapped by the Evil Gods organization. It was revealed that he is not Hitto's actual father, but rather, his uncle who pretends to be his father. He is actually the older brother of Hitto's real mother. In the end, he helps Hitto and the others to escape the collapsing Evil God Organization's castle and lives a normal life with Hitto, Kodoh and Teruma.
Kyousuke Arasaki (荒崎キョウスケ, Arasaki Kyōsuke)
Voiced by: Kousuke Toriumi, Rika Morinaga (younger)
In the anime, he is the secretary of Saionji Konzern. He is the second character in the anime to uses two B-Damans at once with Kodoh being the first. He first obtained his Omega Bahamut in episode 40, and later, his Alpha Bahamut in episode 43. His past shows that his father held a grudge against Saionji Konzern for being thrown away. His father told him to never trust in anyone and wants to rule the world, but died in the end with Kyousuke burying his father's own grave. For his father's sake, he works with Saionji Konzern and betrays them in the later story, became the new president of Saionji Konzern. In the end, his plan to rule the world failed when Kyousuke was defeated by Hitto in the last episode and fell into an explosion. He suddenly reappears and told Hitto's father that he will not lose to Hitto next time, and disappears in the light.
In the manga, he is the oldest of the eight successors of Evil Gods organization. The Evil Gods crest is on his forehead. He often bullies Teruma by using a whip, and kicks Kodoh on the head. He also calls Kodoh by the name "Kodoh-chan". He has a strong desire to become Tycoon Shō's successor. He owns a bad personality and calls Hitto as "that toy". It was revealed that he is Shō's second experiment to create a very strong B-Der. While battling Hitto, he got thrown in the sky and fell into the sea, and as the Evil Gods organization's castle collapse to the sea, he holds against a floating driftwood in the middle of the sea and made himself to the land. In the end, he swears that he will return and get his revenge on Hitto and Shō.
