= B-Daman =

Marble shooting toy franchise

- Official logo.
- Created by: Takara
- Owner: Takara Tomy

Print publications
- Comics: See § Manga

Films and television
- Television series: See § TV series

Games
- Video game(s): See § Video games

Miscellaneous
- Toy(s): Battle B-Daman; Bomberman B-Daman; Bakugaiden; B-DaBalls
- Based on: Bomberman and other franchises
- Established: 2003

B-Daman (ビーダマン, Bīdaman) is a marble shooting toy franchise produced in Japan by Takara. It was originally based on the Bomberman series, but later expanded into other franchises and its own original designs.

The toy's design is a humanoid figure, with a round cavity in its abdomen that houses a specially made marble (though other marbles of the same size may be used). The marble is launched by pressing a spring-loaded trigger on the back of the figure. Different attachments and accessories can be used to change various traits of the B-Daman, such as its accuracy, power, balance, control, and firing rate. They are customizable, and each have their own special gimmick.

In the Japanese language Battle B-Daman toys, the marbles are referred to as "B-Dama". In all cases they are simply called "marbles" (Japanese: ビー玉; bīdama, hence the name "B-Daman") in Japan. In the English language B-Daman toylines and media, the marbles were originally called 'B-DaBalls", but was later changed to "B-DaMarbles".

In 2020, a spiritual successor to the B-Daman brand was launched with Cap Revolution Bottleman. This series shares the majority of its themes and design language with B-Daman, but uses plastic screw caps instead of marbles. Some of the toys included in the series are directly based on B-Daman figures and characters, with appropriately updated names.

== Timeline ==
- In 2004, Hasbro collaborated with Takara and Fox Entertainment Group to bring the franchise to the US.
- In 2005, Hasbro licensed the "Battle B-Daman" configuration of the toy.
- In 2005, Takara licensed the show to Fox Entertainment Group, later in 2019, The Walt Disney Company.

== Game rules ==
As the toys are marble launchers at their core, various structured games may be played with them. Hasbro's Battle B-Daman Tournament Sets include rules for the following ten games:

- Direct Hit Battle (DHB): Shoot at each other's B-Daman until the opponent's B-Daman's switch is hit. In the "Zero" system, this causes a cap to block the barrel and prevent any more marbles from being fired (originally a specially made game piece would pop out). A Direct Hit Battle accessory is required.
- B-Daman Blast: Flip 4 target gates with 6 marbles.
- Hard Target: Shooting a battle pins hidden behind target barricades.
- B-Daman Invasion: Shoot at the battle puck in the arena until it reaches opponent's baseline. This is known as "Battle Hockey" in Japan.
- B-Daman Assault: Flip your opponent's gates in 30 seconds.
- Shoot the Gap: Shoot between standing target pins while avoiding hitting them.
- DHB Havoc: Similar to DHB, but the opposing B-Daman is behind target barricades placed in the battlefield.
- Battle Hammer: Try to shoot the puck as far as you can using 5 shots.
- B-DaChallenge: Each player sets up a shot and tries to complete it. If they are successful, their opponent must replicate it. The player that fails to replicate the opponent's shot is the loser.
- Ultimate Strike: A classic bowling-esque game of shooting down as many target pins as possible in one shot.

== Toy series ==
Many iterations of the toy designs have been released over the years.

- Bomberman B-Daman (1993): modeled after Bomberman.
- Bakugaiden (1995): Assembled from western-style, armor-themed parts, which was the basis for the later Battle B-Daman.
- Bakugaiden II (1996): Was sold with Super Bomberman 4.
- Bakugaiden III (1997): B-Daman can be turned into vehicles.
- Bomberman B-Daman Bakugaiden IV (1998): Unlike previous series, it is only sold unassembled, with interchangeable parts. Starting from the premier of the TV series, kits are no longer numbered.
- Bomberman B-Daman Bakugaiden V (1999)
- Battle B-Daman (2003): This series features the Zero System, which allows for interchangeable parts and customization.
- Crash B-Daman (2005): This series uses a pistol type grip and trigger, making it look vaguely like a pistol laid on its side. It is also compatible with some Battle B-Daman parts. Crash only produced 40 models before being canceled.
- Cross Fight B-Daman (2010)
- B-Daman Crossfire (2011), released by Hasbro in 2013.
- B-Daman Fireblast, known as Cross Fight B-Daman eS in Japan (2012)

== Adaptations ==
=== Manga ===
- Bomberman B-Daman Bakugaiden (1997–1999)
- Bomberman B-Daman Bakugaiden V (1998)
- Super B-Daman (1995–2001)
- B-Legend! Battle B-Daman (2002–2005)
- Crash B-Daman (2006–2007)
- B-Daman Crossfire (2011–2012)
- B-Daman Fireblast (2012–2013)

=== TV series ===
- Bomberman B-Daman Bakugaiden (1998–1999)
- Bomberman B-Daman Bakugaiden V (1999–2000)
- Super B-Daman (1999)
- Battle B-Daman (2004)
- Battle B-Daman: Fire Spirits! (2005)
- Crash B-Daman (2006)
- B-Daman Crossfire (2011–2012)
- B-Daman Fireblast (2012–2013)

=== Video games ===
- Bomberman B-Daman (Super Famicom, Japan Only)
- Super B-Daman (Game Boy, Super Famicom, Japan Only)
- Super B-Daman: Fighting Phoenix (Game Boy Color, Japan Only)
- Super B-Daman: Battle Phoenix 64 (Nintendo 64, Japan Only)
- Bomberman B-Daman Bakugaiden (Game Boy Color, Japan Only)
- B-Densetsu Battle B-Daman (Game Boy Advance)
- B-Densetsu Battle B-Daman 2 (Game Boy Advance, released in the US as B-Daman: Fire Spirits)

=== Card ===
- Bomberman B-Daman Bakugaiden card game
- B-Battle B-Daman card game b-daman scan thit wo the card

== See also ==
- List of toys
