= Battle Girls: Time Paradox =

Japanese anime television series

- Cover of the first DVD volume
- 戦国乙女～桃色パラドックス～ Sengoku Otome ~Momoiro Paradokkusu~
- Created by: Heiwa
- Written by: Touko Machida
- Directed by: Hideki Okamoto
- Voices of: Satomi Akesaka; Mariya Ise; Sachi Kokuryu; Rei Mochizuki; Eri Kitamura; Rina Hidaka
- Music by: Eishi Segawa
- Opening theme: "Kagerou" by Tenka Tori Tai
- Ending theme: "Atsuki Ya no Gotoku" by Tenka Tori Tai (Note: In episode 10, the "~Shinjuu Otome Version~" is sung by Eri Kitamura); "Ashita e" by Rina Hidaka (Note: Episode 13)
- Country of origin: Japan
- Original language: Japanese
- No. of seasons: 1
- No. of episodes: 13

Production
- Executive producer: Hideyuki Nanba; Ikumi Hayashi; Kaoru Hirooka; Kazuto Unagi; Kōji Mitsugawa; Ryōta Katō; Takahiro Sasaki; Yoshihiro Fujiwara
- Producers: Masaru Nikaidō; Ryōsuke Ōno; Tetsuya Kinoshita; Yū Kiyozono
- Cinematography: Yoshihiro Sekiya
- Animator: TMS Entertainment
- Editor: Kiyoshi Hirose
- Running time: 24 minutes
- Production companies: Pony Canyon; Showgate; Sotsu; TMS Entertainment; TV Tokyo

Original release
- Network: TV Tokyo
- Release: April 5 – June 27, 2011

Related
- Video game

Sengoku Otome: Battle Legend
- Developer: Shirogumi NMD
- Publisher: Planet G
- Genre: Action
- Platform: PlayStation Vita
- Released: JP: August 25, 2016

Battle Girls: Time Paradox, known in Japan as Sengoku Otome: Momoiro Paradox (戦国乙女～桃色パラドックス～, Sengoku Otome ~Momoiro Paradokkusu~; lit. Warring States Maidens: Pink Paradox), is a 2011 Japanese anime television series based on the CR Sengoku Otome pachinko game series developed by Heiwa. Produced by TMS Entertainment under the direction of Hideki Okamoto, the anime series aired on TV Tokyo between April 4, 2011, and June 27, 2011. The series has been licensed in North America by Sentai Filmworks. A video game based on the series, Sengoku Otome: Legend Battle, was released for PlayStation Vita on August 25, 2016.

== Plot ==
Yoshino Hide, an average teenager, finds herself mysteriously transported to a land that appears to be Feudal Japan, albeit in an alternate world entirely made up of females. She ends up encountering the feudal lord, Nobunaga Oda, and helps on her quest to gather the pieces of a Crimson Armor that will help her conquer the land.

== Characters ==
The characters share the names of various historic figures in Feudal Japan, albeit their given names are spelled out in katakana.

Yoshino "Hideyoshi" Hide (日出・"ヒデヨシ"・佳乃, Hide "Hideyoshi" Yoshino)
Voiced by: Ayano Niina (game), Rina Hidaka (anime) (Japanese); Brittney Karbowski (English)
A ditsy schoolgirl who finds herself transported to an alternate Feudal Japan made up of women. She at first struggles to fit in with her new world and often brings a lot of modern ethics to this time, including finding uses for her mobile phone despite not being able to get a reception. She is made Oda's retainer after showing skill with a staff, although she isn't good with combat and can't use magic. She is nicknamed "Hideyoshi" after Toyotomi Hideyoshi.
Nobunaga Oda (織田 ノブナガ, Oda Nobunaga)
Voiced by: Yukari Tamura (game), Megumi Toyoguchi (anime) (Japanese); Shelley Calene-Black (English)
A feudal lord who desires to gather pieces of a mystical armor to unite the nations. While very short-tempered, aggressive, and overconfident, in the course of the story she becomes more benevolent, considerate, and caring under Hideyoshi's influence. She wields a large sword and appears to be able to control flames. She habitually carries around a kiseru given to her by her grandmother Nobubasa as a good luck charm, despite never smoking it.
Mitsuhide Akechi (明智 ミツヒデ, Akechi Mitsuhide)
Voiced by: Rie Kugimiya (game), Eri Kitamura (anime) (Japanese); Emily Neves (English)
Nobunaga's humble aide, who is often bemused at her acceptance of Hideyoshi's odd behavior and is secretly infatuated with Nobunaga. To this end, she is prepared to do whatever it takes to "make Nobunaga happy", which is why she is willing to acquire the Crimson Armor set on her feudal lord's behalf. Subconsequently, she is also jealous, at times, with Hide's interactions with Nobunaga. She bears a resemblance to one of Hideyoshi's classmates from her time and is often nicknamed "Akerin" (あけりん) by Hideyoshi due to this likeness. Her weapon of choice is the kunai.
Masamune Date (伊達 マサムネ, Date Masamune) / Ms. Date (伊達先生, Date-sensei)
Voiced by: Mai Nakahara (game), Yuka Hirata (anime) (Japanese); Genevieve Simmons (English)
A warrior affiliated with Nobunaga and Mitsuhide, who is secretly Hideyoshi's teacher from the present. After witnessing a family member from the distant future arriving before her and then disappearing again, she decided to go back in time to find the Crimson Armor whose legend her descendant had discovered, in order to put Japan's history "on the right track" under the rule of her family. However, she did not know about the Armor's evil influence. Like Hideyoshi, she can't fight and possesses no magical abilities.
Yoshimoto Imagawa (今川 ヨシモト, Imagawa Yoshimoto)
Voiced by: Maria Yamamoto (game), Rei Mochizuki (anime) (Japanese); Maggie Flecknoe (English)
A feudal lord whose primary weapon is a yumi. She owned the left leg of the Crimson Armor but lost it to Nobunaga in a game. She is often bored and considers Nobunaga 'fun'. To her, Tokugawa is nothing short of a cute little sister. In episode 7, she is revealed to be a yuri fan.
Ieyasu Tokugawa (徳川 イエヤス, Tokugawa Ieyasu)
Voiced by: Saeko Chiba (game), Satomi Akesaka (anime) (Japanese); Hilary Haag (English)
Yoshimoto's retainer, who wields a priestess staff and magic in battle. Despite appearing to be gentle and obedient, Ieyasu is actually manipulative and also after the Crimson Armor. She bears a resemblance to one of Hideyoshi's classmates and is nicknamed "Tokunyan" (とくにゃん) by Hideyoshi as a result. After being freed from the armor's evil influence, she realizes the error of her ways and becomes more benevolent.
Shingen Takeda (武田 シンゲン)
Voiced by: Mikako Takahashi (game), Sachi Kokuryu (anime) (Japanese); Tiffany Grant (English)
A feudal general who wields a large fan and controls wind and fire. She owns a section of the Crimson Armor and is friends/rivals with Kenshin. She is rather awkward in expressing herself, and appears to be unaware of the power of the Armor.
Kenshin Uesugi (上杉 ケンシン)
Voiced by: Kana Ueda (game), Mariya Ise (anime) (Japanese); Carli Mosier (English)
A feudal lord who wields a spear and utilizes lightning. She owns a section of the Crimson Armor and is friends/rivals with Shingen. She appears to be unaware of the power of the Armor.
Hattori Hanzō (服部ハンゾウ)
Voiced by: Akeno Watanabe (anime) (Japanese); Tiffany Terrell (English)
A bespectacled ninja (of many identical ones) who serves Ieyasu.
Shiro (シロ)
Voiced by: Nozomu Sasaki (Japanese); Greg Ayres (English)
A male, slightly lecherous dog which wears a feudal helmet and has the ability to talk, though he only talks around Hideyoshi (and later Ms. Date). He is knowledgeable about the world and time, and the fact Hideyoshi is not from it.
Nobubasa
Oda's grandmother, who only appears in flashbacks in the series.

== Media ==
=== Anime ===
The anime aired in Japan on TV Tokyo between April 5, 2011, and June 27, 2011, and was simulcast by Crunchyroll. Sentai Filmworks have licensed the series in North America and released it on DVD and Blu-ray Disc on February 26, 2013. The opening theme is "Heatwaves" (陽炎-kagerou-) while the ending theme is "A Flaming Arrow Comes" (熱き矢の如く, Atsuki Ya no Gotoku), both performed by Tenka Tori Tai (Satomi Akesaka, Mariya Ise, Sachi Kokoryu and Rei Mochizuki).

==== Episode list ====
No.	Title	Original release date
1	"A Maiden Teleported" "Tensō Otome" (Japanese: 転送乙女)	April 5, 2011
Yoshino "Hideyoshi" Hide is an average student who is suffering from extreme bad luck and has to brush up on her history knowledge for a test in order to avoid summer classes. As she goes to a shrine to pray for her success, she spots a woman performing a strange ritual inside the shrine. When she is spotted, she clumsily stumbles towards the woman and they both disappear. When Hideyoshi comes to, she finds herself in a forest and discovers a blazing village, where a warrior resembling her friend Akemi is fighting against some vandals before a scantily-clad mysterious woman saves her. The two women take Hideyoshi back to their palace, where they introduce themselves as Nobunaga Oda and Mitsuhide Akechi, and become curious about the technology Hideyoshi has. Hideyoshi is unfamiliar with the location and her phone has no reception. With Hideyoshi seeming to think that she has warped to the Sengoku period, but with historical figures portrayed as women, Hideyoshi attempts to leave to find her way home, but gets lost and is retrieved by Nobunaga. Nobunaga reveals her ambition to gather the pieces of the Crimson Armor, and Hideyoshi innocently agrees to help her. Later, Hideyoshi is approached by a helmet-wearing white puppy who, to her surprise, is somehow able to talk.
2	"A Confused Maiden" "Konwaku Otome" (Japanese: 困惑乙女)	April 12, 2011
After Hideyoshi had an embrassing morning, she, Nobunaga and Mitsuhide head to the village that was burnt down the previous night. With the victims downhearted due to losing their homes, Hideyoshi uses her own unique methods to lift everyone's spirits. Later that day, Hideyoshi speaks with the talking dog she met earlier named Shiro, who tells her she has ended up in the past of an alternate world which doesn't have any men and that babies are delivered by storks; however, he has no knowledge on how she can return home. The next day, Mitsuhide starts training Hideyoshi to become a warrior. Despite losing all of her sparring matches with Mitsuhide, Hideyoshi shows promise fighting with a staff, having previously seen a tv program about Kung Fu, and is made Nobunaga's retainer. Meanwhile, Mitsuhide comes with a woman wearing an eyepatch.
3	"Sky Maiden" "Tenkū Otome" (Japanese: 天空乙女)	April 19, 2011
Nobunaga, Hideyoshi and Mitsuhide go to meet with Imagawa Yoshimoto to negotiate for the left leg of the Crimson Armor, along with Tokugawa Ieyasu, who also resembles one of Hideyoshi's high school friends, but Yoshimoto refuses to hand it over. Not wanting to use her forces to obtain, Nobunaga gets an idea from Hideyoshi and settle things via recreation, challenging Yoshimoto to a variety of games, but also taking Hideyoshi's suggestion the wrong way. After reaching a tie, the final game involves kite fighting, with Hideyoshi and Ieyasu attached to kites with fireworks attached to them. Ieyasu's attempt to cheat are unknowingly foiled by Yoshimoto. Hideyoshi's firework doesn't go off thanks to Ieyasu's attacks and Ieyasu goes up instead. Hideyoshi manages to catch her from falling, but then her firework goes off after all, causing them to fall into the water. At the end of the day, Yoshimoto admits her loss and gives Nobunaga the armor piece and Hideyoshi is rewarded with some Japanese sweets. Later that night, Hideyoshi gets furious with Shiro for peeping at her, Nobunaga, and Mitsuhide while they were in the baths earlier.
4	"Confrontation Maiden" "Taiketsu Otome" (Japanese: 対決乙女)	April 26, 2011
Nobunaga, Hideyoshi and Akechi bear witness to a lengthy battle between Kenshin Uesugi and Shingen Takeda, who both possess pieces of the Crimson Armor. As Hideyoshi tries to take a picture with her phone, it gets hit with an electrical discharge from the battle and breaks. Mitsuhide becomes downhearted when her idea to retrieve the armor is rejected by Nobunaga. After running into Ieyasu, Mitsuhide decides to go behind Nobunaga's back to try to obtain the armor for her by turning Kenshin and Shingen against each other, tying up Hideyoshi when she learns of it to keep her from informing Nobunaga. After Nobunaga frees Hideyoshi, she punishes Mitsuhide for disobeying her by stealing her glasses before going to meet Kenshin and Shingen herself, challenging them both to a battle for the armor. After Nobunaga defeats Shingen in battle, she agrees to relinquish the armor if she kills her, but Kenshin stands in their way, offering her life to save Shingen. Nobunaga chooses not to kill either of them and accepts both pieces of the armor. Kenshin and Shingen later have a friendly duel with each other.
5	"Ghost Story Maiden" "Kaidan Otome" (Japanese: 怪談乙女)	May 3, 2011
Yoshimoto and Ieyasu invite Nobunaga, Hideyoshi, Mitsuhide, Shingen and Kenshin to go hawk-hunting, in which they use trained hawks to hunt for food. When the hawk goes into a mysterious wood while chasing after a rabbit, the others venture in, where they find Masamune Date (the eyepatch woman from earlier) sitting round a gathering of dead samurai who are forcing her to tell 100 ghost stories. The others soon learn they can't leave the forest until they tell all 100 stories, which proves to be difficult since none of Nobunaga's stories are scary and Mitsuhide is easily frightened. Being mocked by the others, Hideyoshi gives Nobunaga a story from her time, the performance of which proves to be so scary it puts out all the remaining candles, allowing the dead samurai to pass on and the others to leave. Ieyasu is seen conspiring with her henchman, planning to encourage Nobunaga to complete the armor so that she can take it from her; Hideyoshi notices her true colors. Nobunaga reveals that she not only caught the rabbit from before, but had also killed and cooked it, to Hideyoshi's dismay.
6	"Memory Maiden" "Omoide Otome" (Japanese: 想出乙女)	May 10, 2011
Mitsuhide recalls the day she first met Nobunaga, who took a liking to her and showed her a world outside of her workaholic life, asking for her help in conquering the land. Meanwhile, Nobunaga takes Hideyoshi through the inspection tunnels, talking about the good luck charm she received from her grandmother, Nobusada. However, as they prepare to head back, Hideyoshi accidentally activates the security system, filling the way back with deadly traps. Meanwhile, Masamune talks with Mitsuhide, before Nobunaga and Hideyoshi manage to escape from the tunnel. It is revealed that Masamune is actually Hideyoshi's teacher, Ms. Date, who travelled back from the present after discovering someone that came out of the shrine and then disappeared also revealing that she was the woman who unintentionally brought Hideyoshi into this world.
7	"Drama Maiden" "Engeki Otome" (Japanese: 演劇乙女)	May 17, 2011
As Nobunaga and co. put together a play as per Hideyoshi's recommendation, Mitsuhide becomes irritated with Hideyoshi. Having trouble coming up with a script, Hideyoshi ends up adapting one of Yoshimoto's yuri stories. After rehearsals, Hideyoshi is troubled both by Shingen and Kenshin vying for bigger roles and Ieyasu's controversial suggestion for an ending. On the day of the play, after the various script changes pan out, Ieyasu's servant, Hanzō Hattori, ends up accidentally setting fire to the stage (to Ieyasu's anger), trapping Hideyoshi inside, but Nobunaga comes to her rescue. Following the success of the failed play, Masamune informs Nobunaga about the location of the last pieces of the Crimson Armor.
8	"Fever Maiden" "Binetsu Otome" (Japanese: 微熱乙女)	May 24, 2011
Nobunaga, Hideyoshi and Mitsuhide travel on foot towards Saigoku to negotiate for the remaining armor pieces, unaware that they are followed by Hanzō and Masamune. Stopping in a town to rest, the villagers show fear towards Nobunaga, believing rumors that she eats children. This turns out to be due to Mitsuhide's attempt to spread word of Nobunaga's kindness, which somehow got scrambled as it was passed along from person to person. After another long hike, they came across a village with a hot spring, which Hideyoshi spends too long in and catches a fever. With her fever worsening, Masamune anonymously donates some modern medicine from her time, claiming it to be from overseas. With Hideyoshi unable to swallow the medicine without water, Nobunaga try giving her some water through mouth to mouth method, which Mitsuhide happens to witness. As Hideyoshi recovers the next morning and the trio arrive in Saigoku, the three owners of the armor keep an eye on them.
9	"Saigoku Maiden" "Saigoku Otome" (Japanese: 西国乙女)	May 31, 2011
As Mitsuhide becomes downhearted having mistaken the "kiss" between Hideyoshi and Nobunaga, the trio are confronted by the three owners of the armor, Motochika Chōsokabe, Sōrin Ōtomo and Motonari Mōri. However, they are easily restrained by Nobunaga, who has Hideyoshi tickle tortures them into telling her the location of a chest containing the armor. However, Mitsuhide becomes too focused on her jealousy that she doesn't notice the chest is booby-trapped before handing it to Nobunaga, who barely avoids it. The Saigoku Trio escape and kidnap Hideyoshi, taking her to the top of the mountain and demanding Nobunaga bring the rest of the armor. Nobunaga and Mitsuhide become separated, with Nobunaga facing Motonari while under the effect of an anesthetic, while Mitsuhide faces Motochika and Sorin, who exploit the weaknesses in her confidence. However, they manage to regain their resolve, win their respective battles, rescue Hideyoshi, and gather the remaining armor parts. As Mitsuhide falls deeper into despair over Nobunaga's preference towards Hideyoshi, Ieyasu and Masamune make plans to claim the armor.
10	"Double Suicide Maiden" "Shinjū Otome" (Japanese: 心中乙女)	June 7, 2011
As the trio stop by Honnouji on the way back, Hideyoshi reads up on her history of her world, in which Mitsuhide betrayed and killed Nobunaga. Overhearing Mitsuhide talking to herself about potentially killing Nobunaga, Masamune tells her to test her bonds first and gives her some supposedly strong sake. That night, Mitsuhide ties up Hideyoshi to ensure that she can't interfere and offers the sake to Nobunaga until she passes out, before setting the inn she is on fire. Before walking into the flames herself, Hideyoshi breaks free and stands before Mitsuhide, telling her that she should face her feelings before heading inside to search for Nobunaga. As Mitsuhide goes in after her, she finds Nobunaga, who stops her from throwing her life away by reminding her how important she is to her. When Mitsuhide stops breathing as a result of taking in too much smoke, Nobunaga performs CPR on her to bring her back. As Hideyoshi continues to search the burning building, she discovers Masamune attempting to steal the Crimson Armor. As she awakens after being saved by her, Hideyoshi comes to realization that Masamune is actually her teacher. As Masamune escapes with the armor, she is confronted by Ieyasu.
11	"Pillaging Maiden" "Gōdatsu Otome" (Japanese: 強奪乙女)	June 14, 2011
As Nobunaga, Hideyoshi, and Mitsuhide catch up to Masamune, they find her already beaten, the armor taken by Ieyasu who is now attacking Nobunaga's castle. As Nobunaga and Mitsuhide head to the castle, Masamune explains to Hideyoshi how she travelled back in time to obtain the Crimson Armor and allow the Date clan to conquer Japan after gaining a device from a time traveler who came from the future, inadvertently ending up in the alternate past and bringing Hideyoshi with her. She explains she had encountered a Date clan member from the future, later discovering a jewel that could send her through time and a scroll containing the legend of the Crimson Armor. As Ieyasu sneaks into the castle to try to retrieve the remaining pieces of armor, Masamune warns Hideyoshi that the armor will go out of control if not equipped with the jewel she brought with her. Ieyasu uses her magic to activate the armor, awakening its dark power, which then takes control of her.
12	"Warring Maiden" "Sengoku Otome" (Japanese: 戦国乙女)	June 21, 2011
As Ieyasu becomes possessed by the armor's evil influence and unleashes her power on the village, Hanzō, who realizes that Ieyasu is no longer the Ieysau he knew, begs the others to help save her. Nobunaga asks the other feudal lords for her help in stopping her, with Hideyoshi insisting that they find a way to do it without killing her. Working together, the group combine their attacks to overwhelm Ieyasu, giving Nobunaga the opportunity to break the armor, turning Ieyasu back to normal. Realizing how dangerous the armor's power is and what her misdeeds have caused, Ieyasu reforms, albeit with a newfound fondness for Nobunaga.
13	"Sunshine Maiden" "Yōkō Otome" (Japanese: 陽光乙女)	June 27, 2011
As Nobunaga begins rebuilding her castle, Masamune finds the Crimson Armor amongst the wreckage and becomes swayed by its influence. As Masamune pleas that she needs to wear the armor to change the world, Nobunaga (aware of the armor's dangerous power) tells her how her recent experiences taught her that there is more to being a leader than to rule with power. As her friends stand to fight against her should she try, Nobunaga uses this distraction to knock away and destroy the armor, saying there is no need for it, bringing Masamune back to her senses. Afterward, as the feudal lords return to their homelands, Masamune tells Hideyoshi that they need to return to their own time. In the epilogue, Hideyoshi once again comes late to school and later stops in front of the temple and spots a dog who reminds her of Shiro. When she confronts the dog, she discovers it is Shiro, who is elated to see Hideyoshi, but he can't play with her because of an important mission he has to complete. Hideyoshi begs him to know what he's doing, so he whispers it to her.

=== Video game ===
An action video game developed and published by Planet G, titled Sengoku Otome: Legend Battle, was released for the PlayStation Vita on August 25, 2016.
