= B-Daman Crossfire =

Japanese anime television series

クロスファイト ビーダマン (Kurosu Faito Bīdaman)
- Genre: Action, Adventure
- Manga
- Written by: Makoto Mizobuchi
- Published by: Shogakukan
- Magazine: CoroCoro Comic
- Original run: 2011 – 2012
- Volumes: 1
- Anime television series
- Directed by: Yoshinori Odaka
- Produced by: Yoshikazu Beniya (TV Tokyo); Rika Sasaki
- Written by: Shinichi Inotsume (S1); Hiroyuki Kawasaki (S2)
- Music by: Akifumi Tada
- Studio: SynergySP
- Licensed by: NA: ADK Emotions NY, Inc.
- Original network: TXN (TV Tokyo)
- English network: AU: Eleven; CA: YTV, Nickelodeon; IN: Hungama TV; SG: Disney XD; US: The CW (Vortexx)
- Original run: October 2, 2011 – September 30, 2012
- Episodes: 52
- Other series
- List of all B-Daman manga; List of all B-Daman TV series

B-Daman Crossfire, known in Japan as Cross Fight B-Daman (クロスファイト ビーダマン), is the first B-Daman anime of the Cross Fight series and the seventh B-Daman anime series, overall. Premiering on October 2, 2011, in Japan, it became the first B-Daman anime to air in almost five years, and first to be produced in 16:9 widescreen, following the finale of Crash B-Daman on December 25, 2006. Its last episode, Conclusion! Cross Fight's New Era aired on September 30, 2012, in Japan. A sequel series, B-Daman Fireblast, premiered the following week.

On June 8, 2013, it was announced that B-Daman Crossfire would air on Disney XD Malaysia.

It was scheduled for a tentative release across global markets outside of Asia in September 2013. Starting August 17, 2013, English dubbed episodes of B-Daman Crossfire started airing on The CW's Saturday morning block, Vortexx. The series later began airing in Canada on YTV on September 7, 2013, subsequently premiering on YTV's sister channel, Nickelodeon on October 18, 2013.

The anime formerly rerun on Primo TV.

== History ==
On June 3, 2011, toy giant, Takara-Tomy revealed that a new anime series to be based on the latest revival of the B-Daman toys, Cross Fight B-Daman, was green-lit for fall 2011. Slated to premiere on October 2, 2011, through Japanese television network, TV Tokyo and other channels as previous B-Daman anime have. Set on time, the anime aired on the 8:45 AM JST time-slot, Sunday morning following an airing of Metal Fight Beyblade 4D.

26 episodes were ordered but due to the growing popularity of the Cross Fight B-Daman toyline, an additional serving of 26 episodes aired. This brought the anime up to 52 episodes, around the ideal number for toy-based anime. While the series concluded on September 30, 2012, its sequel premiered the following week.

On September 28, 2012, d-rights created a promotional poster for use at a trade show. Showcasing a preliminary English logo concept, d-rights was seeking possible companies and networks interested in licensing the anime abroad. Not long after on October 18, 2012, the trade show turned out a success with dub the series in English and other languages, as well. An international name of "B-Daman Crossfire" was chosen along with a tentative release for autumn 2013.

Much later on April 8, 2013, d-rights neared completion in negotiations with Hasbro for release outside of Asia. To compensate for this, d-rights' parent, Mitsubishi, opened up a dubbing company specialized for international dubs called, SUNRIGHTS INC. Based in Albany, New York in the USA, they dubbed CrossFire in English with general releases in September 2013.

== Synopsis ==
B-Daman Crossfire follows Riki Ryugasaki, an absent-minded young boy who eventually discovers a particular game called B-Daman, which involves using animal-looking figures to shoot marbles at targets. One day, he helps his friend with a tournament, and as a result, he receives a B-Daman of his own named Thunder Dracyan.

After learning about secret tournaments held at different locations, Ricky decides to attend one, and as a result, gets deeply involved with the game, as well as gaining new rivals.

As a result, Ricky divulges himself more into the sport of Cross Fight by learning the various new game types, mechanics, and such as he plans to learn the secrets of B-Daman. At the same time, he meets new friends and enemies/rivals during the game.

== Characters ==
=== East block ===
Ryugasaki Kakeru (龍ヶ崎 カケル) / Riki Ryugasaki (in the English anime)
Voiced by: Momoko Ohara (Japanese); Mona Marshall (English)

A B-Shot who belongs to the East Block. His B-Daman is the power type Thunder Dracyan. He is a cheerful, modern boy who aspires to become an adventurer. Originally he did not have much interest in B-Daman, but then he gets his partner, Dracyan, through a chance encounter.

Kaito Samejima (鮫島 カイト) / Kaito Samejima
Voiced by: Meguru Takahashi (Japanese); Erin Fitzgerald (English)

An energetic, cheery B-Shot who belongs to the East Block. His B-Daman is the rapid-fire type Lightning Fin. Since he has lived abroad, he has a straightforward and open personality. He enjoys entertaining the spectators with flashy, "charming plays", like his impressive one-handed rapid-fire.

Gouichiro Tsukiwa (月輪 ゴウイチロウ) / Grizz Sukino (in the English anime)
Voiced by: Akio Suyama (Japanese); Kirk Thornton (English)

A wild B-Shot who belongs to the East Block. His B-Daman is the power type Thunder Bearga. He demolishes the targets with powerful plays that utilize his large physic. He is an athletic type who is usually calm and kind, but when it comes to competing he gets more excited than anyone and has a strong sense of justice.

Yukihide Washimura (鷲村 ユキヒデ) / Yuki Washimura (in the English anime)
Voiced by: Hiroshi Okamoto (Japanese); Michael Sinterniklaas (English)

A B-Shot with an enormous appetite. Born in West City and a West Block B-Shot, he moved to East Block when his parents started to open restaurant at East City.

Shumon Katsumiya (蠍宮 シュモン) / Simon Sumiya (in the English anime)
Voiced by: Mai Aizawa (Japanese); Katie Leigh (English)

A rich B-Shot from a wealthy family who belongs to the East Block. His B-Daman is the rapid-fire type Lightning Scorpio. Proud and arrogant, he sees Riki as a rival and is constantly coming up with devious tricks and tactics. However, he is really an endearing character who is also very shy and fearful of girls.

=== West block ===
Subaru Shirogane (白銀 スバル) / Samuru Shigami (in the English anime)
Voiced by: Sachi Kokuryu (Japanese); Wendee Lee (English)

The top B-Shot in the West Block. His B-Daman is the rapid-fire type Lightning Dravise, voiced in English by Dave Mallow. Contrary to Riki, he is cool and reserved. He is proud and has a sharp mind. He is a boy of many mysteries who makes no attempt to open up to any of the other B-Shots. He senses some sort of power in Riki that is different from the other B-Shots. Though he does not think much of Riki at first, he eventually starts to consider him a rival.

Reiji Maki (巻 レイジ) / Reggie Mak (in the English anime)
Voiced by: Hitoshi Yanai (Japanese); Sam Riegel (English)

The number two B-Shot in the West Block. His B-Daman is the precision type Strike Cobra. He is a street smart bad-boy who never lets his target escape once he has it in his sniper-like sights. In his block, he considers Samuru his rival.

Raidou Ouga (来堂 オウガ) / Hugo Raidoh (in the English anime)
Voiced by: Kazuyuki Okitsu (Japanese); Doug Erholtz (English)

A West Block B-Shot. His B-Daman, Thunder Leo, excels at the "Spin Shot." Calling himself as the "King of 1 Beasts", he is a hot-blooded B-Shot who shocks onlookers with his wild howls and unconventional behavior. He gets along well with Derek.

=== South block ===
Naoya Homura (焔 ナオヤ) / Novu Moru (in the English anime)
Voiced by: Chihiro Suzuki (Japanese); Steve Staley (English)

Formerly a top B-Shot in the South Block. His B-Daman, Strike Dragren, excels at precision shots. His play style is logical and calm. He uses strategy and intellect to analyze the situation and control his opponent.

Aruba Kokodouro (アルバ・ココドゥロ) / Alba Cocodoro (in the English anime)
Voiced by: Yūdai Satō (Japanese); Todd Haberkorn (English)

His B-Daman, Lightning Diles, excels at rapid-fire. He is a B-shot who lives in a village along the South Tamazon River in the jungles outside of South City. He is a descendant of the Cocodoro family, guardians of the ancient B-Daman civilization. After meeting Riki and the others, he leaves his village to help them.

Daiki Watari (渡 ダイキ) / Derek Watari (in the English anime)
Voiced by: Yuki Kaida (Japanese); Barbara Goodson (English)

Formerly a top B-Shot in the South Block. His B-Daman, Supreme Tigare, excels at both precision and rapid-fire. He used to rule the South Block as the "Boss of the South." He is a troublemaker with a rough and careless manner. He respects and follows Novu Moru.

=== North block ===
Basara Kurofuchi (黒渕 バサラ) / Basara Kurochi (in the English anime)
Voiced by: Shinnosuke Tachibana (Japanese); Bryce Papenbrook (English)

A B-Shot hailing from the North Block. His B-Daman, Double Drazeros, is a special type that can fire two shots at once. A delinquent living in North City, he joined Crossfire after he met Drazeros. He has a violent nature and wants to destroy all other B-Daman.

Asuka Kamiougi (神扇 アスカ) / Asuka Kami (in the English anime)
Voiced by: Yuichi Iguchi (Japanese); Jeff Nimoy (English)

A B-Shot hailing from the North Block. His B-Daman, Drift Jaku, can fire the irregular Curve Shot. He is a charismatic, but narcissistic, child model with a strong sense of beauty. He always carries a folding fan.

Arano Gun (荒野 グン) / Gunner Arano (in the English anime)
Voiced by: Yoshinori Sonobe (Japanese); Spike Spencer (English)

A B-Shot hailing from the North Block. His B-Daman, Thunder Bison, can deliver a super-charged Power Shot. A famous football player in North City with trademark dreadlocks, he is also Basara's childhood friend.

=== Central ===
Sumeragi Ryuuji (皇 リュウジ) / Rudy Sumeragi (in the English anime)
Voiced by: Yūko Sanpei (Japanese); Dorothy Elias-Fahn (English)

Has the ultimate B-Daman, Smash Dragold, which combines all four types: power, rapid-fire, precision, and special. He started B-Daman because he wanted to be like Riki, but becomes possessed by Dragold in the Ruins of North Sumadora. When he takes Dragold, his personality completely changes. Acting with the arrogance of a king and using overwhelming power, he drives Crossfire to the verge of ruin.

=== WBMA staff ===
Tenpouin Ruri (天宝院 ルリ(てんぽういん るり)) / Rory Takakura
Voiced by: Cristina Vee

A female Cross Fight staff member who sometimes wearing bunny ears.

Tenpouin Saneatsu (天宝院 実篤(てんぽういん さねあつ)) / Takakura
Voiced by: Lucien Dodge

Rori's grandfather.

Shirogane Gennosuke (白銀 弦之助(しろがね げんのすけ))
Voiced by: Bob Buchholz

Samaru's father.

B-Da RYU (ビーダRYU) / Announcer
Voiced by: Jamieson Price

A Cross Fight match announcer.

=== Other person ===
Sumi Inaba (稲葉ナツミ, Inaba Natsumi)
Voiced by: Megumi Takamoto (Japanese); Colleen Villard (credited as Olivia Charles) (English)

Riki's female friend who has a crush on him.

Akira Saiga (雑賀(さいが) アキラ Saiga Akira)
Voiced by: Christopher Corey Smith

The owner of Miracle Shot B-Daman shop.

Hose (ホセ)

Alba's grandfather.

Kakeru's mother (カケルの母)

TBA

Yamashiro-sensei (山城先生(やまぎせんせい)) / Miss Yamashiro

A female teacher from Kakeru's class.

Tamada Tamao (玉田タマ男（たまだ タマお）) / Tama chan (タマちゃん(たまちゃん))

Takeru's friend from the comic book version of Cross Fight B-Daman.
