= Nieves Delgado =

Spanish writer and teacher

- Born: 5 August 1968 (age 58); Ferrol, Galicia, Spain
- Education: University of La Laguna
- Occupations: Writer, teacher
- Awards: Ignotus Award (2015)

Nieves Delgado (born 5 August 1968) is a Spanish science fiction writer, winner of the Ignotus Award for her short story "Casas Rojas". She has written two novellas, a multitude of short stories, and several articles. She is the editor of the AEFCFT anthology Visiones 2018. In addition to writing, she works as a physics teacher in secondary education.

== Biography ==
Nieves Delgado was born in Ferrol on 5 August 1968. She studied physics at the University of Santiago de Compostela, later specializing in Astrophysics at the University of La Laguna, Tenerife.

Her knowledge of science together with her passion for the genres of science fiction and horror have made her work revolve around technology and artificial intelligence, almost always with a clear component of philosophical reflection. She began publishing in 2012 ("La condena"), and soon received her first Ignotus Award nomination for her story "Dariya" (2014). The following year, she was nominated again for her short story "Casas Rojas", and this time she won in the Best Story category.

In 2016 she presented her collection of short stories Dieciocho engranajes. Relatos de futuro (Adaliz Ediciones, 2016), and in 2017 her first novella, 36 (Editorial Cerbero, March 2017).

In 2018 Delgado received two Ignotus nominations: Best Novella for 36, and Best Article for "La segunda división de la literatura", in Editorial Cerbero (July 2017). Her latest novel is UNO (Editorial Cerbero, January 2018).

== Works ==
=== Novellas ===
- 36 (Editorial Cerbero, March 2017)
- UNO (Editorial Cerbero, January 2018)

=== Short story collections ===
- Dieciocho engranajes. Relatos de futuro (Adaliz Ediciones, 2016)

=== Anthologies ===
- Ellos son el futuro (Ficción Científica, 2013). Story: "Hacia dentro"
- Alucinadas (Palabaristas, 2014). Story: "Casas rojas"
- Mundos (Ficción Científica, 2014). Stories: "No habrá lápidas" and "Segadores". Prologue
- Vampiralia (2014). Story: "Sepultura"
- En los albores del miedo (Dolmen, 2015). Story: "La caja"
- Quasar (Nowevolution, 2015). Story: "La Reserva"
- Fabricantes de sueños 2014-2015 (AEFCFT, 2016). Story: "Casas rojas"
- Herederos de Cthulhu (Kokapeli Ediciones, 2016). Story: "El color que salió del agua"
- Más allá del tiempo y del espacio (Ficción Científica, 2016). Story: "La cuarta ley"
- Retrofuturo. Una mirada a los años 70 (Cazador de ratas, 2016). Story: "Ego te absolvo"
- Quasar 2 (Nowevolution, 2017). Story: "Tiempo detenido"
- Manual de supervivencia (Palabaristas, 2018). Story: "Haz lo que quieras"
- Poshumanas (Libros de la ballena, 2018). Story: "Casas Rojas"

=== Short stories ===
- "La condena" (SdCF - Antología de relatos, 2012)
- "Dariya" (TerBi 7, 2013)
- "Hacia dentro" (Ellos son el futuro, Ficción Científica, 2013)
- "La pregunta correcta" (SdCF - Antología de relatos, 2013)
- "Segadores," (Portal Ciencia y Ficción 2, 2013)
- "Casas Rojas" (2014). (Alucinadas, Palabaristas, 2014)
- "Cosas de niños" (miNatura 133, 2014)
- "No habrá lápidas" (Mundos, Ficción Científica, 2014)
- "Sepultura" (Vampiralia, 2014)
- "El color que salió del agua" (TerBi 2014)
- "La caja" (En los albores del miedo, Dolmen, 2015)
- "La reserva" (Quasar, Nowevolution, 2015)
- "Génesis" (Revista Supersonic, 2015)
- "La Cuarta Ley" (Más allá del tiempo y del espacio, Ficción Científica, 2016)
- Ego te absolvo (Retrofuturo. Una mirada a los años 70, Cazador de ratas, 2016)
- "Almas viejas" (Dieciocho engranajes. Relatos de futuro, Adaliz Ediciones, 2016)
- "Aurora" (Dieciocho engranajes. Relatos de futuro, Adaliz Ediciones, 2016)
- "Fundido en blanco" (Dieciocho engranajes. Relatos de futuro, Adaliz Ediciones, 2016)
- "Diagnóstico" (Dieciocho engranajes. Relatos de futuro, Adaliz Ediciones, 2016)
- "Solo uno" (Dieciocho engranajes. Relatos de futuro, Adaliz Ediciones, 2016)
- "El despertar" (Dieciocho engranajes. Relatos de futuro, Adaliz Ediciones, 2016)
- "No lo permitas" (Dieciocho engranajes. Relatos de futuro, Adaliz Ediciones, 2016)
- "Perlas negras" (Dieciocho engranajes. Relatos de futuro, Adaliz Ediciones, 2016)
- "Punto ciego" (Revista Supersonic, 2016)
- "Tiempo detenido" (Quasar 2 Nowevolution, 2017)

=== Articles ===
- "La segunda división de la literatura", in Editorial Cerbero (July 2017)
- "Transhumanismo", in Revista Digital Portalcienciayficción No. 1

== Awards ==
- 2014: Finalist for the Ignotus Award for Best Story, for "Dariya"
- 2015: Ignotus Award for Best Story, for "Casas Rojas"
- 2018: Finalist for the Guillermo de Baskerville Award for 36
- 2018: Finalist for the Ignotus Award for Best Novella, for 36, and Best Article, for "La segunda división de la literatura"
