= Luis Delgado =

Luis Delgado may refer to:

- Luís Delgado (born 1979), Angolan footballer
- Luis Delgado (musician) (born 1956), Spanish musician
- Luis Delgado (Colombian footballer) (born 1980), Colombian footballer
- Luis Eduardo Delgado (born 1984), Spanish footballer
- Luis Antonio Delgado (born 1990), Mexican footballer
- Luis Delgado (tennis), Dominican tennis player
