= Burst Ball Barrage!! Super B-Daman =

Television series

- Volume 1 cover

爆球連発！！スーパービーダマン (Bakkyū Renpatsu!! Sūpā Bī-Daman)
- Manga
- Written by: Shun Imaga
- Published by: Shogakukan
- Magazine: Coro Coro Comics
- Original run: September 1995 – December 2001
- Volumes: 15
- Anime television series
- Directed by: Naoyoshi Kusaka
- Produced by: Naohiko Furuchi
- Written by: Sukehiro Tomita
- Music by: Cher Watanabe
- Studio: Xebec
- Original network: TXN (TV Tokyo)
- Original run: January 4, 1999 – October 1, 1999
- Episodes: 18
- Other series
- List of all B-Daman manga; List of all B-Daman TV series

Burst Ball Barrage!! Super B-Daman (爆球連発！！スーパービーダマン, Bakkyū Renpatsu!! Sūpā Bī-Daman) is a Japanese manga series serialized in Coro Coro Comics, based on Takara's B-Daman toy. It was first released in 1995. An anime series produced by Xebec was shown in TV Tokyo between January 4 to October 1, 1999.

== Characters ==
=== Team Guts ===
Originally, Team Guts consists of only three members in their first ever JBA tournament, but later on in the story, in order to compete in the competition with other teams from different JBA department, other two members are decided for their new team. The original members of Team Guts are as follow:

==== Original Team Members ====
Tosaka Tamago
Tamago is a young, energetic innocent fifth grade boy who loves everything about B-daman and B-da Battles. He always recalls Ganma as his best friend, and believe in the spirit of B-ders.
Tamago always play his game fairly, and he usually has his own unique style of playing, without logic. He respects the other B-ders the same way he respects everything about B-daman, and he'll never let a single one humiliate the B-da spirit of all B-ders.
Tamago has a total of eight B-damans in the history of Super B-daman series, including his first ever B-daman, White B-daman. All of his B-damans are Power-Type. These are Tamago's B-daman, listed order of B-daman he received.
- White B-daman (Owned at the beginning of the story, supposedly from his father)
- Fighting Phoenix (The first upgraded version of OS B-daman, received after White B-daman is destroyed by Ijuin's drive shot)
- Battle Phoenix (Power-Type PI B-daman, received after Fighting Phoenix is destroyed by Ijuin's Kong Cerberus in the final round of JBA tournament)
- Combat Phoenix (Power-Type PI-EX B-daman, received at the second round of second JBA tournament)
- Guardian Phoenix (Power-Type RE B-daman, received at the final round of second JBA tournament)
- Speed Phoenix (Power-Type R-Unit B-Daman)
- Vanguard Phoenix(Power-Type E-Unit B-daman, received at the final round of final battle in JBA )
- Smash Phoenix (???)
Although, Tamago can by clumsy and too innocent at time being, while sighting the world at the bright side. He's not the smartest one after all, but his instinct and power is beyond normal.
Nishibe Ganma / Sniper Ganma of the West
Tamago's best friend, and also his long-time rival. Ganma is the most famous B-ders from Kanzai, who is commonly known as "Sniper Ganma" or "Sniper from the West", from his unique accuracy and rapid fire skills.
Gunma is a very strategic and intelligent person. His plan always work as effectively as he planned, and he may even think of some craziest ever tactics to overcome the enemies. He's the main man of Team Guts, and supposedly, the leader of the team.
Although, unlike Tamago, Ganma is more mature and reasoning. He look at both side of the world, to observe the good and bad of the situation. However, after being friend with Tamago, Ganma's mind sometimes becomes out-of-reason, resulting himself trying out many mission-impossible tactics when Tamago is around. Gunma believes that Tamago's spirit and power are beyond normal, and he admitted that when Tamago is around, anything can be possible.
In the history of Super B-daman series, Ganma supposedly has a total of 6 main b-daman (excluding his collections of other B-daman for researching and developing new tactics). All of his B-damans support his rapid fire skills and his accuracy in B-da Battles.
- Magnet Bomber (Owned at the beginning of the story, past about this B-daman is unknown)
- Wild Wyvern (The second upgraded OS B-daman, created after the creation of Fighting Phoenix)
- Valiant Wyvern (Rapid-Fire PI B-daman, created after the creation of Battle Phoenix)
- Spread Wyvern (Rapid-Fire PI-EX B-daman, created after the creation of Combat Phoenix)
- Flash Wyvern (Rapid-Fire RE B-daman, created after the creation of Guardian Phoenix)
Although, Gunma is very short-tempered, and rarely can be as clumsy as Tamago is. Ganma also hates to be humiliated by some B-ders, for being in an infamous unknown team like Team Guts, and for being weak without power. Ganma's only weak point is that he's scared of ghosts.
Cerer / Magician Cerer
- Golden B-daman
- Stagg Sphinx
- Stagg Cerberus
- Power Sphinx

==== New members ====
The two new members are as follow:

Kazama Yoshinori / Billy the Wild Wind of the East
- 2 Bomber System B-daman
- Blast Eagle and Blast Lion >>> Blast Griffon
- Phantom Eagle and Phantom Lion >>> Phantom Griffon
- Mirage Eagle and Mirage Lion >>> Mirage Griffon
Negota Nekomaru
- Bomber System B-daman
- Hunting Lynx

==== Team assistance ====
The assistance of this team is Dr. Tamano, who is one of the JBA staff that create and research about B-Daman. Dr. Tamano is known to be one of the very intelligent scientist in the JBA departments, who develop new system for new generation of B-Daman. Although, with Team Guts themselves, he sometimes act childishly to get some attention from the team.

=== King B-Das ===
- Atsumasa Ijuin: Kung Cerberos (jpn), konigh Kelbros (Indonesia), Konig Ceberus / OS System
- Motoo Saotome: Iron Cyclops (PI System)
- Akari Hozomaki: Jungker Unicorn (OS System)

== Product List ==
- 51 White B-Daman
- 52 Black B-Daman
- 53 Blue B-Daman
- 54 Red B-Daman
- 55 Gold B-Daman
- 58 Green B-Daman
- 60 Yellow B-Daman
- 64 Angle Shot Special
- 65 ???
- 68 Return Special
- 69 ???
- 70 ???
- 74 Master Koryuokou Special
- 78 Grey B-Daman
- 79 Fighting Phoenix
- 80 ???
- 81 ???
- 84 Sniper Special
- 85 Dark Blue B-Daman
- 90 Wild Wyvern
- 94 Stagg Sphinx
- 102 Master Koryoukou Special II
- 109 Junker Unicorn
- 112 Kong Cerberous
- 113 Dr. Tamano Special
- 114 Battle Phoenix
- 115 Iron Cyclops
- 116 JBA Proto 01
- 117 Blast Griffon
- 118 Valiant Wyvern
- 120 Natalius Posideidon
- 122 Hunting Lynx
- 123 Stag Cerberous
- 124 OS White B-Daman
- 125 OS Black B-Daman
- 126 OS Blue B-Daman
- 127 Master Koryoukou Special III
- 128 Burning Atlas
- 129 Combat Phoenix
- 130 JBA EX 01
- 132 Giga Salamander
- 133 EX Shadow Bomb Set
- 134 Cool Helios
- 135 Spread Wyvern
- 136 Shooting Basket Set
- 137 Crimson Gigant
- 138 Phantom Eagle
- 139 Phantom Lion
- 140 Blade Orochi
- 141 Guardian Phoenix
- 142 Striker Gemini
- 143 Guardian Phoenix (Pre-Built)
- 144 Striker Gemini (Pre-Built)
- 145 Guardian Phoenix vs Striker Gemini Set
- 146 Guardian Phoenix Black Version
- 147 Eternal Eclipse
- 148 Burst Orion
- 149 Speeder Phoenix
- 150 Galaxy Fortress
- 151 Gold Guardian Phoenix + Metallic Eternal Eclipse + Clear Burst Orion Set
- 152 Flash Wyvern
- 153 Flash Wyvern Fierce Blazing Edition (Dark Clear)
- 154 Flash Wyvern (Pre-Built)
- 155 Powered Sphinx
- 156 Hammer Gemini
- 157 Mirage Eagle
- 158 Vanguard Phoenix
- 159 Stinger Scorpion
- 160 Smash Phoenix
