= Estuardo Díaz Delgado =

Peruvian politician (born 1944)

Estuardo Díaz Delgado (born 20 July 1944) is an architect, who was the Mayor of the city of Chimbote, Peru between January 1, 2003 and December 31, 2006.
