= Darío Delgado =

Darío Delgado may refer to:

- Darío Delgado (footballer, born 1969), former Uruguayan footballer
- Darío Delgado (footballer, born 1985), Costa Rican footballer for Guangdong Sunray Cave F.C.
