= Bomberman B-Daman Bakugaiden V =

Japanese anime television series

Bビーダマン爆外伝V (Bonbāman Bīdaman Bakugaiden Bikutorī)
- Created by: Shigeki Fujiwara; Shoji Mizuno; Yoji Mizuno
- Manga
- Written by: Koichi Mikata
- Published by: Shogakukan
- Magazine: CoroCoro Comic
- Original run: July 1, 1998 – November 1, 1998
- Anime television series
- Directed by: Nobuaki Nakanishi
- Produced by: Masamitsu Oike; Katsuya Shirai; Fumiko Manabe; Mami Ohara
- Written by: Tatsuhiko Urahata
- Music by: Akifumi Tada
- Studio: Madhouse
- Original network: ANN (Nagoya TV, TV Asahi)
- Original run: February 7, 1999 – January 30, 2000
- Episodes: 50
- Other series
- List of all B-Daman manga; List of all B-Daman TV series

Bomberman B-Daman Bakugaiden Victory or Bomberman B-Daman Bakugaiden V (Bビーダマン爆外伝V（ボンバーマンビーダマンばくがいでんビクトリー）, Bonbāman Bīdaman Bakugaiden Bikutorī) is a Coro Coro Comic series by Koichi Mikata, based on Bomberman and B-Daman. The animated television series is broadcast on Nagoya TV. V stands for "Victory" but the anime is also based on the 5th BB-daman manga.

== Characters ==
=== B-DaCop ===
- Shirobon (White Bomber): A B-da Cop who travels through space and time to protect peace in the world. He is determined but a bit childish at times.
- Aobon (Blue Bomber): Shirobon's partner. He is very shy and timid, but always pulls through in the end to save his friends.
- Kurobon (Black Bomber): An elite B-da Cop who is very independent and acts on his own. He often comes in at critical times to save the other B-da Cops and then disappears as quickly as he came. He also has a number of shining medals, and is said to be the "uncrowned king".
- Akabon (Red Bomber): She is the princess of Border Kingdom. After Devil Vader attacks her country she is saved by the B-da Cops Shirobon and Aobon. She later joins them as a B-da Cop to stop Devil Vader and save her kingdom.
- Kiirobon (Yellow Bomber): A Kansai speaking shipping carrier who dreams of becoming a B-da Cop. While he waits to become one, he assists the others in their battles against dark B-da.
- Midoribon (Green Bomber): A soldier from Border Kingdom who was stranded on an island. After being rescued by the B-da Cops, he joins forces with them to save Border Kingdom. He is very dedicated to Akabon and is willing to die for her.
- Graybon Hakase (Professor Gray Bomber): A genius scientist who builds new armors for the B-da Cop.
- Mimitan: A bat-like animal who is Graybon Hakase's assistant.

=== Devilvader ===
- Akumantle:A mustached villain. For a while, the only one with a mecha of his own, but Docdandy and Gestler both obtain mechas as well in Episode 20. His Mecha resembles a scorpion.
- Docdandy:A rather girly villain who likes pretty things, dislikes Kiirobon and has a crush on Kurobon. His mecha resembles a bee.
- Devil Slinger: A very experienced Devilvader who seems to resemble a gunslinger. He and Kurobon are rivals.
- Gestra:A chubby villain who is the brains of his trio, formed by him, Akumantle and Docdandy.
- King Vader: The demon-like Devilvader leader.

=== Others ===
- Geniusbon
- Witchy
- Carrierbon
- Bestbon
- B-DaMaster
- B-Da King

== Episodes ==
1. 出動!ビーダコップ: written by Akiyoshi Sakai
2. 発進!ジークホワイター: written by Akiyoshi Sakai
3. 爆走!宅配便野郎: written by Isao Shizuya
4. 憧れのビーダコップ: written by Isao Shizuya
5. 謎のくろボン登場!: written by Akiyoshi Sakai
6. 撃て!ガトリングシュート: written by Isao Shizuya
7. キャビレット城の秘宝: written by Akiyoshi Sakai and Masashi Miura
8. ボーダー王を探せ!: written by Isao Shizuya
9. 発見!第4のクリスモンド: written by Isao Shizuya
10. きっと明日は晴れるから: written by Seishi Minakami
11. 影の戦士くろボン: written by Seishi Minakami
12. 荒野の少年シェリフ: written by Shigeru Yanagawa
13. たたかえ!ダイブレッダー: written by Tomoyasu Okubo
14. 名探偵あおボン: written by Isao Shizuya
15. 登場!みどりの疾風: written by Seishi Minakami
16. 暴走!みどりの騎士: written by Tomoyasu Okubo
17. 飛べ!ジークホワイター: written by Isao Shizuya
18. くろボンの正体!?: written by Seishi Minakami
19. とりもどせ!ボーダー王の記憶: written by Tomoyasu Okubo
20. 射て!レーザーホワイター: written by Seishi Minakami
21. 古代エジプタンの秘宝: written by Hideo Takayashiki
22. 怪盗ねずみボン現る: written by Isao Shizuya
23. きいろボンVSビーダコップ: written by Tomoyasu Okubo
24. 参上!クリスホワイター: written by Tomoyasu Okubo
25. 完成!?謎の三体合体: written by Seishi Minakami
26. 潜入!くろボンを追え: written by Isao Shizuya
27. 翔べ!クリスブルード: written by Seishi Minakami
28. グレイボン博士のライバル: written by Isao Shizuya
29. 新たな敵デビルスリンガー: written by Tomoyasu Okubo
30. 荒野のスリンガー: written by Tomoyasu Okubo
31. 魔女の特訓便: written by Seishi Minakami
32. みどりボンVSくろボン: written by Seishi Minakami
33. ヒロインボンを救え!: written by Isao Shizuya
34. くろボンVSスリンガー: written by Tomoyasu Okubo
35. クリスブラッカー誕生!: written by Tomoyasu Okubo
36. 飛び散ったクリスモンド: written by Seishi Minakami
37. 幽霊船を追え!: written by Isao Shizuya
38. 地と海のビーダロイド: written by Tomoyasu Okubo
39. スーパービーダコップきいろボン: written by Seishi Minakami
40. 小さくなったビーダコップ: written by Isao Shizuya
41. 奪われたクリスモンド: written by Seishi Minakami
42. 裏切りのスリンガー: written by Tomoyasu Okubo
43. スリンガーの最後: written by Tomoyasu Okubo
44. 襲来!キングベーダー: written by Seishi Minakami
45. めざせ!ビーダキャリバー: written by Seishi Minakami
46. 発現!ビーダキャリバー: written by Tomoyasu Okubo
47. ボーダー王を救出せよ: written by Tomoyasu Okubo
48. きいろボンギャグ100連発: written by Seishi Minakami
49. 暴走!歪んだ時空: written by Seishi Minakami
50. 輝け!ビーダキャリバー: written by Tomoyasu Okubo
