= Sachi Kokuryu =

Japanese actress

- 國立幸
- Born: July 9, 1984 (age 42); Saitama Prefecture, Japan
- Occupations: Actress; voice actress
- Years active: 2000–present
- Agent: Himawari Theatre Group
- Height: 160 cm (5 ft 3 in)
- Spouse: Shiozaki Kōsei (m. 2016)

Sachi Kokuryu (國立幸, Kokuryū Sachi; born July 9, 1984) is a Japanese actress and voice actress from Saitama Prefecture.

== Filmography ==
=== Television animation ===
2004

- Kyo Kara Maoh!, Shori Shibuya (childhood)
- Windy Tales, Boy (ep 11), Announcer (ep 7)

2005

- Onegai My Melody, Yamato
- Ginga Legend Weed, Weed
- Sugar Sugar Rune, Taiji Sugiyama

2006

- Minami no Shima no Chiisana Hikouki Birdy, Dorū

2007

- Kishin Taisen Gigantic Formula, Sergei Kulakovskii
- D.Gray-man, Eric (ep 32)

2008

- Kyo Kara Maoh! Season 3, Shori Shibuya (childhood)

2009

- Katekyō Hitman Reborn!, Fran
- Yu-Gi-Oh! 5D's, Sly

2010

- Tayo the Little Bus, Alice
- Nura: Rise of the Yokai Clan, Umewakamaru (12 years old)
- Mainichi Kaasan, Ōkawa-kun

2011

- B-Daman Crossfire, Subaru Shirogane
- Battle Girls: Time Paradox, Shingen Takeda
- Yu-Gi-Oh! Zexal, Tron

2012

- B-Daman Crossfire eS, Subaru Shirogane
- Monsuno, Noah, Medea

2013

- Gundam Build Fighters, Aria von Reiji Asuna
- Monsuno, Ash (childhood)
- Baku Tech! Bakugan, Nibiru
- Hajime no Ippo: Rising, Ippo Makunouchi (childhood)
- Devils and Realist, Ashutarosu
- Line Offline Salaryman, Jessica
- Line Town, Jessica, Aunt

2014

- Yu-Gi-Oh! Zexal II, Tron, Ōhi

2015

- Attack on Titan: Junior High, Ilse Langnar
- The Seven Deadly Sins, Arthur Pendragon
- Dog Days", Verde
- Gintama°, Isao Kondo (childhood)
- Triage X, Goryū
- Mr. Osomatsu, Chibita
- Mobile Suit Gundam: Iron-Blooded Orphans, Azee Gurumin

2016

- Snow White with the Red Hair 2nd Season, Kazuki
- Kamiwaza Wanda, Yuto Kamiya
- Mob Psycho 100, Shou Suzuki
- My Hero Academia, Katsuki Bakugo (childhood)

2017

- Pocket Monsters: Sun & Moon, Professor Burnet
- Tomica Hyper Rescue Drive Head Kidō Kyūkyū Keisatsu as Taiga Yagura
- Tsugumomo as Shirou Shiramine

2018

- Laid-Back Camp as Ryōko Toba
- The Seven Deadly Sins: Revival of The Commandments, Arthur Pendragon
- Doreiku as Zero Shinagawa

2019

- Beyblade Burst GT as Pot Hope

2020

- Tsugu Tsugumomo as Shirou Shiramine
- Iwa-Kakeru! -Sport Climbing Girls- as Chigusa Kumagai

2021

- Mars Red as Shinnosuke Tenmaya

2022

- Legend of Mana: The Teardrop Crystal as Duelle

2023

- The Fire Hunter as Kun
- Four Knights of the Apocalypse as Arthur Pendragon

=== Theatrical animation ===
- Eiga Drive Head: Tomica Hyper Rescue Kidō Kyūkyū Keisatsu (2018), Taiga Yagura
- Mr. Osomatsu: The Movie (2019), Chibita
- Mr. Osomatsu: Hipipo-Zoku to Kagayaku Kajitsu (2022), Chibita

=== OVA/OAD ===
- Attack on Titan: Ilse's Notebook (2013), Ilse Langnar

=== ONA ===
- Xam'd: Lost Memories (2008), Seitaka

=== Video games ===
- Fuga: Melodies of Steel 2, Kyle Bavarois, Cannelle Muscat
- Granblue Fantasy, Caim
- Goes!, Masanori Niiyama
- Katekyō Hitman Reborn!, Fran
- Yu-Gi-Oh! Zexal: Clash! Duel Carnival!, Tron
- The Seven Deadly Sins: Grand Cross, Arthur Pendragon
- Zakusesuhebun, Raguel Noir

=== Drama CD ===
- Goes! Drama CD Series, Masanori Niiyama
- Katekyō Hitman Reborn!, Fran

=== Tokusatsu ===
- Ultraman Nexus (ep 26)
- Ultraseven X (ep 4)

=== Live-action films ===
- Shi ga Futari wo Wakatsu Made: Nananka, Sayoko Noriki

=== Dubbing roles ===
==== Live-action ====
- The 100, Octavia Blake (Marie Avgeropoulos)
- All My Life, Jenn Carter (Jessica Rothe)
- Clarice, Ardelia Mapp (Devyn A. Tyler)
- Squid Game, Kang Sae-byeok (HoYeon Jung)

==== Animation ====
- OK K.O.! Let's Be Heroes, Enid
