= Antonio Delgado (footballer) =

Cape Verdean footballer (1939–2022)

Personal information
- Date of birth: 15 December 1939
- Place of birth: Cape Verde
- Date of death: 16 March 2022 (aged 82)

Senior career*
Years	Team	Apps	(Gls)
1967–1968	Strømsgodset		
- * Club domestic league appearances and goals

Antonio Delgado (15 December 1939 – 16 March 2022) was a Cape Verdean former footballer. He was nicknamed "Strømsgodset's Eusebio.” He was the first African to play with a Norwegian club and possibly the first Cape Verdean who played with a Scandinavian or a Northern European club.

He later moved to Norway and played with Strømsgodset Toppfotball. He debuted on 15 May 1967 in a match against Rosenborg BK and played seven matches with that club. Delgado scored another goal over FK Lyn on 25 May.
