= Battle B-Daman =

Japanese manga series & television anime

- Cover of the first volume of Battle B-Daman

B-伝説! バトルビーダマン (Bī-Densetsu! Batoru Bīdaman)
- Manga
- Written by: Eiji Inuki
- Published by: Shogakukan
- Magazine: CoroCoro Comic
- Original run: April 2002 – November 2005
- Volumes: 8
- Anime television series
- Directed by: Mitsuo Hashimoto
- Produced by: Shunji Aoki, Shinichi Ikeda, Mamiko Aoki
- Written by: Hiroyuki Kawasaki
- Music by: Takashi Fukigami
- Studio: Nippon Animedia
- Licensed by: Hasbro
- Original network: TXN (TV Tokyo)
- English network: AU: Seven Network; CA: Télétoon, YTV; UK: Toonami UK, Cartoon Network UK; US: ABC Family (Jetix), Toon Disney (Jetix), G4 (Action Blast!)
- Original run: January 5, 2004 – December 27, 2004
- Episodes: 52
- Anime television series

Battle B-Daman: Fire Spirits!
- Directed by: Mitsuo Hashimoto
- Produced by: Shunji Aoki, Shinichi Ikeda, Mamiko Aoki
- Written by: Katsumi Hasegawa
- Music by: Makihiko Araki
- Studio: Nippon Animedia
- Licensed by: Hasbro
- Original network: TXN (TV Tokyo)
- English network: CA: YTV
- Original run: January 10, 2005 – December 26, 2005
- Episodes: 51
- Other series
- List of all B-Daman manga; List of all B-Daman TV series

Battle B-Daman (Japanese: B-伝説! バトルビーダマン, Hepburn: Bī-Densetsu! Batoru Bīdaman; "B-Legend! Battle B-Daman") is a Japanese manga series by Eiji Inuki which ran in CoroCoro Comics by Shogakukan from 2002 to 2005. An anime adaptation was released in January 2004. It premiered in the United States in April 2005. It is the first show of the B-Daman series to be dubbed in English. In Japan, the second season, titled Battle B-Daman: Fire Spirits! (B-伝説! バトルビーダマン 炎魂, Bī-Densetsu! Batoru Bīdaman), was superseded by Crash B-Daman, a new series with an all new cast and story. The toyline was originally manufactured by Takara and was licensed by Hasbro for release in the United States.

== Gameplay ==
Like other creature-based anime and manga, Battle B-Daman focuses on numerous in-universe games:

- Six wall: Score points by knocking out numbered boxes. In the show, knocking out a wall tile causes a matching item to be dropped into a giant hot bowl. In the show, it is guarded by Pandoro.
- Trap shooting: Shoot down target while running an obstacle course containing lakes, walls, poles. In the desert area, targets periodically disappear. In the show, it is guarded by Shigan.
- Leon stage: A L-shaped stage. Player scores by firing B-DaBalls to the goal zone blocked by 2 spinning fences. This stage emphasizes rapid fire. In the show, it is guarded by Assado.
- Phoenix stage: A T-shaped stage. Player scores 20 points by knocking down targets behind 2 spinning fences. This stage emphasizes rapid power. In the show, it is guarded by Joe.
- Shield stage: A square stage separated by a fence, with right half separated by a spinning fence. Each half contains 3 targets. This stage emphasizes control. In the show, it is guarded by Sly.
- Dragon stage: A zigzag stage with spinning fence in the middle. Player scores 1 point for every B-DaBall landed at opponent's field. This stage emphasizes rapid balance. In the show, it is guarded by Joshua.
- Sword stage: A rectangle stage, played in direct hit battle rules. In the show, it is guarded by Cain.
- Head to head ultimate strike: Each player fires at a rectangular formation of 5x10 pins, located at player's right end at opposite field. Winner is determined by how many pins left standing at the end of match, or who knocks out all pins in opponent's field first. In Yamato vs. Gray match, each player fires at a stage with backward moving track, with spikes at the end of each track. In Terry vs Liena match, player stands on moving wooden posts on a pool filled with vicious marine creatures.
- Super ultimate strike: A game table invented by Armada involving scoring points by shooting at the moving targets at the end of the table. Between 2 ends of the table lies one of 3 obstacles that challenges different skills. Target barricades emphasize on accuracy, gate emphasize on power, and spinner emphasize on rapid fire.
- Cannonball: A shot put type game of firing 5 shots to knock a giant pin furthest from starting point.
- Power alley: Score points by shooting at the target at the opposite end of the table. The amount of score depends on the shot's strength. In B-Daman tournament, player competes in climbing a 100-story tower by shooting at the target, with the rate of elevation based on the score. However, a miss shot causes played to descend from the tower.
- DHB: Direct Hit Battle, whoever hits the opponents B-Daman in a button below the barrel wins. This is the most commonly played variation.

The following games were introduced in season 2:

- Mecha B-DaBattle race/Metal Shot battle race: A game type debuted in the Merimoke village metal shot Battle B-Daman tournament. B-DaPlayer rides a hover board to navigate obstacle course, consisting column, gas, giant B-DaBall. At the end of the course, player wins prize by shooting at the target on the giant Sun Moon-doll.
- Target Road: A game hosted by Mr. Penguin, which is an obstacle course for shooting down all targets within time while running to the targets. The course is guarded by Parthenon, Mr. Penguin's chief of security.
- Knock down block: Player knocks down the top pyramid by knocking down underneath square blocks, arranged in pyramid formation. Winner is decided by the ability of putting the top pyramid to the circle.
- Target Battle: A variant of super ultimate strike game that does not have obstacle between player and target.
- Battle Royal Hockey: A variant of B-Daman Invasion, but with 5 players. A player can be defeated by shooting the puck into the slot in player's side. During the course of the match, extra puck is dropped into the B-DaBattlefield. Under Haja's modification, tear-gas bombs are dropped into B-DaBattlefield, which explode when being fired.
- Spider match: A unique battle involving players standing on a suspending arena made of ropes in spider web formation.

== Season 1 ==
The show is about Yamato Delgado (Daiwa in the Japanese version), who gets the legendary Cobalt Blade. He and his friends use the sport of B-Daman to fight the Shadow Alliance (who wants to take over the world). This show takes place in the B-Da World, a Post-Apocalyptic wasteland where its inhabitants are humans, anthropomorphic animals, and robots. Using the legendary B-Daman, Yamato enters the Winners tournament organized by a group (the JBA in the Japanese version and the IBA (International B-Daman Association) in English version) to become the B-Da Champion. However, he also ends up in fights against the Shadow Alliance.

== Season 2 (Fire Spirits) ==
After the defeat of the Shadow Alliance, Yamato is in search of special B-DaBalls called Strike Shots, which originated from shooting stars. After a fight with the mysterious Haja and obtaining his Strike Shot, the Drive Shot, Yamato then met Gunnos, a rookie B-Da Player. He got his own Strike Shot to participate in the Winners Tournament along with Yamato's old friends and rivals. But little did they know, a terrible evil is about to put the B-Da World in peril once more.

== Characters ==
=== Main cast ===
- Yamato Delgado (大輪 ヤマト, Daiwa Yamato)

Voiced by: Reiko Takagi (Japanese); Brian Beacock (Season 1), Tevi Eber (Season 2) (English)

Introduced in season one, 11-year-old Yamato is the main character. Raised by cats until the age of 5, his foster mother did not allow him to own a B-Daman until Cobalt Blade appeared to him one fateful night. Cobalt Blade, supposedly the best B-Daman ever made. But it gets heavily damaged by Cain McDonnell, one of Yamato's enemies. Following its near destruction, Cobalt Blade is rebuilt as Cobalt Saber, the first B-Daman to use the newly developed Blaster Core (also known as Delta core) system by Armada. This new system allowed the very core of the B-Daman to be modified. Yamato's special attack is Cobalt Power Blast, a powerful attack that utilizes the friction of the battlefield. Yamato somehow looks like a cat. He is most likely named after the powerful Japanese battleship Yamato. In the second season of the anime and second half of the manga, Yamato's Strike Shot is the Drive Shot for his new B-Daman called Cobalt Saber Fire, which would later be upgraded to Cobalt Blaster with the Cartridge system and the Stealth Drive Shot until the final episode in which Cobalt Blaster transformed into Cobalt Blaster Drive Cannon with the R.C. system and the Legend Drive Shot. In the manga, Yamato already begun with having a B-Daman named Cobalt Sword which would be upgraded to Cobalt Blade.

- Gray Michael Vincent (グレイ・マイケル・ビンセント, Gurei Maikeru Binsento)

Voiced by: Yuki Tai (Japanese); Dave Wittenberg (English)

He is Yamato's friend and is a tough guy. He was a member of the Shadow Alliance because he was trying to save his sister Liena from them. He uses the B-Daman, Chrome Zephyr which is later upgraded to Chrome Raven then Chrome Raven Cyclone, Chrome Harrier and then Chrome Windrush Harrier (Chrome Lancer). Gray started appearing in season 1. He is 12 years old. His Strike Shot is the Speed Shot.

- Bull Borgnine (ブル・ボーグナイン, Buru Bōgunain)

Voiced by: Kurumi Mamiya (Japanese); Mona Marshall (English)

Bull has three personalities: The calm and naïve side, the confident side and the wild side that appears when he presents his B-Daman. This dark side remains until the end of a B-DaBattle and can enter a berserker state where he's practically invincible. He uses the B-Daman, Helio Breaker which later gets destroyed and he decides to be a B-Daman mechanic. Later on, he creates Helio Berserker and Helio Flyer which is either from the Delta Core or the Roller Core. Bull started appearing in season 1. He is 11 years old. In season one, Bull met a girl named Karat. She only likes Bull's hyper-form and when she learnt that the "calm" Bull is the true Bull, she lost interest in him. She later goes on to like the calm, full of snot, true Bull. In Season 2, Bull meets up with Akyulus and eventually befriends the silent boy. Bull is the first ever friend of Akyulus. Nearing the start of the second Winners Tournament, he makes a decision to be a full-time B-Da Mechanic, vowing to make Revolver Hades, the best B-Daman ever so that Akyulus could use it to defeat Yamato.

- Terry McScotty (燕 ツバメ, Tsubakura Tsubame)

Voiced by: Tomoko Kaneda (Japanese); Mary Elizabeth McGlynn (ep. 1-6), Barbara Goodson (ep. 7-52) (English)

He is Yamato's fellow friend under Armada. He has a Scottish accent and uses the B-Daman, Wing Ninja which was later recreated into Wing Sword and Wing Eagle. Terry started appearing in season 1. He is 10 years old. In Season 2, Terry and Joe decide to enter the Winners Tournament together but along the way, Terry finds a Strike Shot, Random Shot. Joe deems that Terry will not improve with him along so he leaves, only to find Terry following him, not wanting him to go. However, Haja hears of this Strike Shot and attacks Terry for it. The two enter into battle and Haja pretends to admit defeat. Falling for his trick, Haja snatches the Strike Shot from Terry and he shoots. It is originally aimed towards Terry but Joe steps in to protect his brother/pupil. Terry has his blaster destroyed and then gets a new one named HudoFudoMaru and his Strike Shot is the Split Shot.

- Mie Delgado (大輪 ミエ, Daiwa Mie)

Voiced by: Naoko Takano (Japanese); Philece Sampler (English)

Yamato's foster mother, she adopted him at the age of five. She is 23 years old. She runs a restaurant called Mie's Café, later on changed to Mie's Cat Café. For she is just only one to run her Café, she asked Liena, Armada and all the others to help her run her Café. Then one day, she's suddenly somewhat feared by Armada because Armada always escapes his chores. And when he does that, Mie is getting almost furious. She thought that was the way in making Armada responsible!

- Liena Grace Vincent (リエナ・グレース・ビンセント, Riena Gurēsu Binsento)

Voiced by: Takako Uemura (Japanese); Peggy O'Neal (English)

Gray's sister who was captured by the Shadow Alliance, made into a tough B-DaBattler and Ababa had her impersonate Sigma. She always wants to be at her brother's side. She took a small liking to Enjyu. She had the B-Daman, Garnet Wind which was first made for control, but had rapid fire added in its Zero 2 version. The rapid fire was added due to the new core, the Roller Core. The Roller Core had an added magazine head. The magazine head allowed you to hold 3 B-DaBalls instead of 2. The Roller Core as added to Li Yong Fa's B-Daman, King Rekuso.

- Armada

Voiced by: Paul St. Peter

Yamato's giant cat mentor, the legendary B-Daman master. He invented the Zero system, the framework for which all B-Daman are based upon. After Cobalt Blade was destroyed, he created the Zero 2 Blaster Core system, the framework for which Chrome Raven, Chrome Raven Cyclone, Cobalt Saber, Cobalt Saber Fire, Blazing Kaizer, Garnet Cyclone and then Zero 389. He also created the Cartridge system with Bears in the 2nd season as well as the Metal system in season 3.

- Tommi

Tommi is the black cat that follows Yamato. Marda B's good side uses him later on in the series to speak to Yamato and his friends.

- B-DaMage

Voiced by: Mari Devon

The series narrator, B-DaMage is an omnipotent being who along with her three cats, the Meowmigos (who corrects B-DaMage's mistakes) serves to explain about the world that the story takes places in, the characters, and the rules of B-Daman. She is called "B-Damajin" in the Japanese version.

- Meowmigos

Voiced by: Steven Blum

The Mewomigos are the companions of the B-DaMage.

- Big Cheese

Voiced by: R. Martin Klein

Little is known about this mouse except that he appears in segments with the B'DaMage and the Meowmigos.

=== Shadow Alliance ===
The Shadow Alliance (called simply "Shadow" in Japan) are the main antagonists of Season One with goals of B-DaWorld Domination. Some members of the Shadow Alliance have a 3rd eye which is the symbol of the Shadow Alliance and is a sign that the character is under Marda B.'s control. There are two incarnations of the group: There was the original and the Neo Shadow Alliance. The members of this group are as following:

- Marda B.

Voiced by: Paul St. Peter

Marda B. is the main villain of the 1st season who established the Shadow Alliance and Neo Shadow Alliance. Marda B. was a mysterious being who was the greatest B-DaPlayer. He was the first B-DaMaster. He was a good person, but also very competitive. When he asked for an eternal life to remain undefeated forever, he was punished by being turned into a spirit. His competitive side separated from him and became an evil spirit wanting to conquer the B-DaWorld. The good side came to live in a statue that guarded powerful B-DaBalls carrying his own essence, which became known as the B-Energy, the only thing that can defeat the evil Marda B. When Ababa had been depowered by Marda B. after being exposed as a criminal, he started the Neo Shadow Alliance, where all of the members he sent to, attack Yamato and the gang who were innocent B-DaPlayers under his control (with the exception of Enjyu, Biarce, Cain, Joshua, and Li who joined on their own free will). Marda B.'s evil form seems to be one giant flaming eye (which is very similar in appearance to the eye of Sauron from Lord of the Rings) that always seemed to be floating in the sky. In episode 51, Marda B. fuses with Biarce to form, Marda Biarce, and reveals his plot: He sent the Shadow Alliance after Cobalt Blade, sent the Neo Shadow Alliance to collect B-DaSpirits. and even created Biarce, just so he could culminate his plan to conquer the B-DaWorld by having the ultimate B-DaBattle with Yamato. At the end of the final episode of season 1, his full good form is revealed a seemingly huge gray cat wearing in a white topki.

- Ababa

Voiced by: Steven Blum

An evil cat who worked for Marda B with the ability to brainwash people. He even managed to brainwash Bull. Ababa was the leader of the Shadow Alliance, which consisted of major characters like Gray, Enjyu, Wen, and Li. When depowered by Marda B, he is turned back into his original form, a purple cat with long hair. He makes a small cameo with the rest of the crowd, after Yamato and his friends return from defeating the Neo Shadow Alliance.

- Enjyu (炎呪, Enju)

Voiced by: Daisuke Kishio (Japanese); Steve Staley (Season 1), James Keller (Season 2) (English)

Enjyu used to be a talented kid who wished to improve his skills more as a B-Daman player. His father, however wanted him to take a dive on each of his battles so his dad could pay for their rent. Before each battle, Enjyu's opponents would pay him to lose the match, making them look skilled and Enjyu, an amateur. Fed up of his life, Enjyu joined the Junior B-Daman Tournament. There he was disqualified after unfairly being accused of cheating due to his refusal to repeat his past life. After being betrayed by his only "friend", Enjyu took out his anger on his father in a B-DaBattle. As soon as the battle commenced, Enjyu's personality and hair changed from blue to red. The reason of why his hair changed color is uncertain. After the battle, Enjyu joined the Shadow Alliance where he later received Lightning Kahn (Bloody Kaiser in the original version), the brother of Cobalt Blade, as his new B-Daman. Later in the series, Lightning Kahn was upgraded to Blazing Kahn by Marda B. and later in season 2 is upgraded once more into Variable Kaiser (Hasbro never released a Cartridge System version, so the name remains unchanged), in order to defeat Yamato in the finals. However, instead of defeating him, Enjyu saved Yamato's life and quickly be-friended him. He later rejoined the Neo Shadow Alliance so that he could have fought Marda B. to avenge his new friends. At the end of season 1, Marda B. brainwashes Enjyu, and Terry used his part of the B-Energy to set him free, but Enjyu wasn't happy about that. He was angry because he felt as if Terry wasted his B-Energy, which he could use to save the world, to save him. Although, Terry reasoned that he was his friend and he figured out, with the help of Joe, that it was the morally correct choice. The name is romanized as Enjyu in the English versions and Enju in the Japanese websites. In Fire Spirits, he obtained his own Strike Shot called the Black Drive Shot from a boy that live at the icy mountain.

- Wen Yong Fa (ウェン・ユンファ, Wen Yonfa)

Voiced by: Tomo Shigematsu (Japanese); Brad MacDonald (English)

He is the older of the Yong Fa brothers. He joined the Shadow Alliance at a young age to become a stronger B-DaPlayer. Wen is often blunt and stubborn but also open-hearted and loyal to those he cares about. He and Li first appeared to fight Yamato in a B-DaBattle following Battle Crow's defeat. He uses the B-Daman, Bakuso which was later upgraded to King Bakuso by Bull, then finally to Suiseiryu by Bears and Armada. He changed his ways and left the Shadow Alliance after Yamato helped him in a battle against Enjyu. After Wen left, he continued to help Yamato and the gang, often under Armada's direction. He sometimes wore a mask and cape. When his younger brother, Li Yong Fa, joined the Neo Shadow Alliance to infiltrate Neo Shadow Alliance, he traveled with Yamato and his friends. Unfortunately, Li was not accepted into the alliance, and was made a puppet to Marda B. He eventually fought Li and brought him back to normal. The brothers have not separated since. His Strike Shot is the Metal Spike Shot.

- Li Yong Fa (リー・ユンファ, Rii Yonfa)

Voiced by: Miyako Ito (Japanese); Derek Stephen Prince (English)

The younger brother of Wen, he uses seal papers as his calling card. He uses the B-Daman, Rekuso which was later upgraded to King Rekuso, then to Ryuseiryu by Armada and Bears. Li and Wen first appeared to fight Yamato in a B-DaBattle following Battle Crow's defeat. He and his older brother have been helping Yamato after they left the Shadow Alliance. Later in the series, Enjyu begged Li to help him defeat Marda B. Like Enjyu, Li pretended to work for the Neo Shadow Alliance in order to find Marda B.'s weakness. But Cain did not trust Li's loyalties towards the Neo Shadow Alliance so Marda B. claimed Li's mind, giving Li the third eye and erasing all his past memories. Later, Wen tried to save his brother through a B-DaBattle. Luckily, Wen won and returned Li to his normal self.

- Battle Crow

Voiced by: Steve Kramer

A crow-type birdman. Little is known about this character except he was the first Shadow Alliance member that Yamato faced and that he had goggles that can detect people's power levels. What happened to him after his defeat against Yamato is unknown.

- Monkey Don

Voiced by: Derek Stephen Prince

A humanoid monkey. Little is known about this character except he was the crooked owner of a B-Daman parts shop. He was defeated by Yamato.

- Hounds of Chaos

A group of canine thieves who stole B-Daman parts from Yamato.

- Goldo

Little is known about this character except that he serves as a B-DaBattle trainer in the Shadow Alliance HQ.

- Mukade Benkei

A snake man observer in Goldo's training facility, famed for having stolen 10000 B-Damans.

- Psy Baron

A hooded observer in Goldo's training facility.

- Shooting Galaxy

An armored observer in Goldo's training facility, claimed to be from outer space. Shooting the Galaxy, it later led an attack to Tsubakura city.

- Shadow Alliance Foot Soldiers

Robotic servants of Marda B. that accompany any member of the Shadow Alliance and the Neo Shadow Alliance.

- Biarce

Voiced by: Doug Erholtz

Biarce, the 11 year-old B-DaPlayer created by Marda B. to battle for him.

- Cyber-Mosquito

A robotic mosquito that can cause its target's hands to go weak and unable to use a B-Daman.

==== Neo Shadow Alliance victims ====
- Castieo

After losing to Yamato in qualifying round of B-Daman tournament, he returned to rule Pedro kingdom unmasked under the name of Ike. His B-Daman is Iron Eater.

- The Longhorn Brothers

Voiced by: Beau Billingslea (Nouz), Kirk Thornton (Sauz)

The Longhorn Brothers are Nouz (North) and Sauz (South). They have been hired by Marda B. to join the Shadow Alliance after Ababa's depowerment.

- Manuel

A robot teacher from the B-Daman academy capable of copying its opponent's moves.

- Unnamed Pig, Monkey, and Water Sprite

Servants of Pandoro and victims of Marda B. whom fought Wen and Li for the fate of Pandoro. They were defeated and returned to normal. Note: These 3 characters are modeled from the disciples in Journey to the West.

=== Super Five Field Guardians ===
This is the group from Neon City. They are:

- Cain McDonnell Ruth / Cain McDonnell

Voiced by: Steven Blum

He is the leader of the Super Five. At first, he pretended to be a good guy, but it was later learned that this was a trick in order to destroy Cobalt Blade. He managed to do that by having Joshua fake a kidnapping of Marilyn, but Cobalt Blade was rebuilt into Cobalt Saber. Cain sent Joshua and the other Super Five Field Guardians to put an end to the construction of Cobalt Saber but they failed when they were fended off by Yamato's friends. Cain later joined the Neo Shadow Alliance with Joshua where he sported a different outfit. In the final battle against the Neo Shadow Alliance, he was defeated by Gray. His B-Daman is Knight Cavalry which he purposely destroyed and replaced with Black Knight and then again replaced with Lord Cavalry. His horror past might be the reason why he turned evil. He uses his good looks to be a player amongst all girls.

- Marilyn

Voiced by: Michelle Ruff

She is the field judge of the Super 5 tournament. She later ended up involved in Cain's plot to destroy Cobalt Blade.

- Assado

Voiced by: Colleen Villard

Assado is the one with the lion-headed cape and member of the Super Five Field Guardians. He was the 1st opponent Yamato faced. His B-Daman is Accel Leon. He assisted Cain and the other Super Five Field Guardians in a plot to destroy Cobalt Saber, but was fended off by Yamato's friends. He appeared later on and apologized for helping Cain in his evil plan. He also joined forces with Yamato to defeat the Neo Shadow Alliance, controlled Robot B-DaPlayer Manuel who had taken over the school where Assado studied.

- Joe

Voiced by: Doug Erholtz

Joe is another member of the Super Five Field Guardians and the second opponent whom Bull faced. Joe is a friend to Terry. He assisted Cain and the other Super Five Field Guardians in a plot to destroy Cobalt Blade, but was fended off by Yamato's friends. Joe later returned and helped to fend off Enjyu who had destroyed Terry's B-Daman. His B-Daman is Samurai Phoenix. Joe also appeared in Winners Tournament as Player X during qualifying round.

- Sly

Voiced by: Jamieson Price

Sly is the member of the Super Five Field Guardians and third opponent whom Terry had to face. He assisted Cain and the other Super Five Field Guardians in a plot to destroy Cobalt Blade, but was fended off by Yamato's friends. He later ended up as one of Biarce's victims. He's calm demeanor and ability to stay cool in difficult situations is a result of the military training he went through in his younger years. His B-Daman is Shield Giga.

- Joshua

Voiced by: Brian Beacock

Joshua is the member of the Super Five Field Guardians and fourth opponent whom Bull had to face. When Cain came to visit Yamato, he had Joshua fake a kidnapping by capturing Marilyn in a plot to destroy Cobalt Blade. When Joshua learned about Cobalt Blade's reconstruction, Cain sent him and the other Super Five Field Guardians to prevent it only to be fended off by Yamato's friends. Joshua later joined the Neo Shadow Alliance with Cain. It was later revealed that Joshua is Cain's butler instead of just a friend. He cries when Cain breaks their special B-DaBall. When Cain was defeated, Joshua carried the unconscious Cain out of the Neo-Shadow Alliance's base to an unknown location. His B-Daman is Dragogale.

=== Other characters ===
- Sigma

Voiced by: Yuri Lowenthal

A skilled B-DaPlayer who was replaced by a mind-controlled Liena during the Winners Tournament. He eventually forgives Liena for what she did while under the Shadow Alliance's control with Cain paying him off. He later develops a crush on Liena after that. Sigma later helps to fight the Neo Shadow Alliance.

- Berkhart (バークハート, Bākuhāto)

Voiced by: Kanako Tateno (Japanese); Yuri Lowenthal (English)

One of Yamato's friends. He has tons of brothers and with the help of Yamato, Berkhart's brothers built a new B-Daman for him. It breaks later on by Enjyu in the Winners Tournament due to being too heavy. He later returns to help fight the Neo Shadow Alliance.

- Pete, Metra, Nibus, Pancake

Voiced by: Brianne Siddall

Berkhart's younger brothers. Their names first appeared in episode 47.

- Hoxxe

A sign painter who only works at night.

- Ms. Karat

Voiced by: Dorothy Elias-Fahn

The daughter of Mr. Watts who resides in Neon City. She has developed a crush on one of Bull's personalities.

- Crust

Ms. Karat's butler.

- Mr. Watts

The Mayor of Neon City and father of Ms. Karat.

- Mr. Browbeaten / Mr. Beatenbrow

A B-Daman mechanic who lives in the town of Lyken.

- Cornell

Enjyu's childhood friend. During a tournament, Cornell accused Enjyu of cheating, driving Enjyu towards Shadow Alliance.

- Pandoro

The legendary B-DaSage who also lives in the town of Lyken, living in the temple on Mushroom Mountain.

- Sanjuurou / Sanju

Terry's father, living in Tsubakura City.

- Sari

Terry's mother, living in Tsubakara City.

- Mitsuo

A B-DaPlayer who got 65 points in the Super Ultimate Strike game in episode 42. The name probably came from the show's director, Mitsuo Hashimoto. In Season 2, he also became a fan of Liena.

- Alex Ruth

Cain's father and a town leader.

=== Fire Spirits Characters ===
==== Gunnos ====
- (ガンノス)

Gunnos is a rookie B-DaPlayer who first appears in Season 2, episode 2. Despite being hotheaded, sarcastic and limited experience, he possesses amazing skill. His first B-Daman was a rapid-fire B-Daman named Gun Breaker which was a remake of Helio Breaker from Season 1. He enters the Winners Tournament for his village as he promises them that when he left that he would go and win. After encountering Yamato, he tags along and becomes part of the regular rivalry between the two. While he is rude and obnoxious to Yamato, he is extremely polite towards others such as Terry & Joe, even bowing down to them because he thinks they are "cool and smart," and he saved a village from bandits using his new B-Daman, Break Ogre and his Strike Shot, the Metal Shot. He is in love with a girl named Kiko, and dislikes the daughter of the highest man in their village.

==== Akyulus ====
- (アキュラス)

Little is known about this boy. He has said that he is the last survivor of a clan who knows the secret of a special B-Daman move. His B-Daman was Revolver Hades. He is befriended by Bull, and slowly begins to accept him as a companion and friend. Bull then vows to make Revolver Hades, even better than Cobalt Saber Fire, in order to help Akyulus win the tournament. In the qualifying rounds of the 2nd Winners Tournament, Akyulus is Division 2 and the contestants had to navigate through a series of difficult obstacles to shoot their B-DaBall into the final hole - a B-Daman version of golf. Akyulus is the first to finish, using Revolver Hades' special spin control abilities, making him the first to qualify. In the quarter-finals, the 10 contestants that made it through, are regrouped into Set A and B. Akyulus is grouped into Set A where the five contestants enter a pyramid to face three challenges. They would have to hit a hovering blue ball to pass a challenge and that would transport them to a higher level and eventually out of the pyramid. Akyulus and Enjyu are the victors of this challenge and they come out together so the first to emerge is unknown. In the semi-finals, there are only four contestants left, Yamato, Gunnos, Enjyu and Akyulas. Enjyu and Akyulas face off in a game where they must defend their goal with their B-Daman while attempting to shoot their own B-DaBalls into the opponent's goal. Each player had to score ten goals before they would be declared the winner. Akyulas easily defeats Enjyu, but not before Enjyu finally uses all his strength to score one goal - tarnishing Akyulas' perfect 10–0 to 10–1. Akyulas is said to be a legendary battler from the spirits above. In the Winners Tournament that he joined, he battled last against Yamato. And thanks to that battle, he regained some of his memories, his past. And some of that past is bad. He remembered that 100 years ago, his village was destroyed by the evil side, causing his peaceful village into complete chaos. And, as being a Legendary B-DaPlayer, he also has the power to create Strike Shots. But, when he does that, he loses some of his energy. Thanks to this ability, he attracted the attention of Beadeus and was captured, later forced to create the Ultimate Gadeaum shot. Afterwards, he was released into a dark underground dungeon where Yamato found him. However, due to the creation of the Gadeaum shot, he lost his will and became an uncontrollable, demonic fighter. Also, the Revolver Hades had been upgraded to Gatling Hades sometime during his capture, and he used it to battle and nearly defeat Yamato. However, Yamato managed to rescue him by attacking and disabling Gatling Hades with the Stealth Drive Shot, which was the proof of his and Yamato's friendship. He later on decided to be with Yamato and the gang because Beadeus had already announced to the people of the whole B-DaWorld that Yamato's side and Beadeus's side will fight. In the beginning, Yamato thought that the battle was too easy. Until he found out that the evil sealed by Akyulas's ancestors had been awakened because of the Ultimate Gadeaum Shot that Akyulas had made. Galdezer has now been fully awakened. Now because of the creature's escape, he battled alongside Yamato to defeat Galdezer. He befriends Yamato, Terry, Gray, Gunnos, and all the others later on. Now, in the final battle, it's up to Yamato to succeed. Akyulas thought about Yamato and the Ultimate Gadeaum Shot. He thought that the Strike Shot was so powerful so he thought he should make another Strike Shot that would defeat it. Shin tried to warn him that when he created another Strike Shot, it will cost him his life. He said that he would never create a Strike Shot anymore and would live a happy and peaceful life with Yamato for the rest of their lives. But when he sleeps, he dreamed about Yamato being beaten by Galdezer. He then decided to disobey Shin and create the Ultimate Drive Shot. During the next day, he didn't appear to support his newfound friend, but when Yamato was almost beaten, he then appeared and gave Yamato the Legend Drive Shot. Shin now then knew that he had created another Strike Shot when he told Yamato to use it.

==== Shin ====
- (シン)

He is a talking wolf who travels with Akyulas - seems to speak for Akyulas too. He's the one who first talked to Bull when they met. He sometimes annoys Bull, because Bull calls him a lot of names, like "spot", "doggie" and a lot of other names. He's like the secretary and speaker of Akyulas. He's the one who explained to Yamato and the gang, the past of Akyulas. Ironically, the last time Bull talked to him, Bull finally called him Shin, but he too reacted to the use of his own name as another insult coming from Bull.

==== Haja/Scorpious ====
- (ハジャ)

He is a scorpion-haired B-DaPlayer. Obsessed with entering tournament, he took the Random Shot from Terry and defeated Joe. After losing in the Winners Tournament, he also tried to sabotage the tournament, but was stopped by Terry. Haja eventually lost to Terry in the spider match. Fortunately for him, he was able to recover, thanks to Beadeus and his servants. His mission is supposed to be stopping Yamato and his friends from rescuing Akyulas, but Haja disobeys his "master". He then destroys Beadeus's spy machines. He later "hires" Jinbee to be his loyal servant. Yamato and his friends were unsure of where he ended up to after he tried to stop him again. He was absorbed by Galdezer so that he could have maximum power. After Yamato defeated Galdezer, he was released and promised to everyone that he would never be evil anymore, but then denied it. After that, he was struck by an asteroid. He was the last character to appear in this anime. His B-Daman is the Gale Scorpion which has a quick loading core.

==== Yago ====
The B-Daman smith that made Break Ogre.

==== Kiku ====
Yago's granddaughter is shown to have interest in Gunnos after he helps save her village. She seems to be jealous of Hana after she met her at the Winners Tournament.

==== Aaron Toffler ====
The bandit leader who tried to take the Break Ogre, but was defeated by Gunnos with Break Ogre and the Metal Shot.

==== Bears ====
- Beāsu (ベアーズ)

A B-Daman researcher who designed DHB advance core system.

==== Kia ====
A boy who saves Enjyu at the icy mountain so he can get back to the tournament. He heals Enjyu and helps him recover. Kia's robot, Loodo is killed by Enjyu when he realises the strikeshot is the chest of the robot. After that, Kia swears revenge on him and Enjyu tells him to do that he must become a strong b-da player. Later on, Kia forgives Enjyu and remains by his side at all times.

==== Loodo ====
- Rudō (ルドー)

A mechanical soldier who lived with Kia, guarding Black Drive Shot. Loodo was destroyed by Enjyu during a B-DaBattle against Enjyu.

==== Mr. Penguin ====
A B-Daman organizer for the Target Road game.

==== Parthenon ====
The chief of security of the Target Road game.

==== Madame Yang ====
The town manager of the town with the Spike Shot.

==== Kiba ====
A serious B-DaPlayer who had trained with Wen and Li before entering the town with his Spike Shot and his powerful b-daman go-tiger. He is Wen's best friend. Kiba usually hates jokes, that's why when he usually hears one, he gets really angry which is good because it increases his power.

==== Winners Tournament ====
- Hana (ハナ) / Hanna: Hanna is a green-haired girl that had met Gunnos during a summer, and was abandoned by Gunnos when Hanna showed a bug to Gunnos. Hanna eventually met Gunnos in the Winners Tournament. When Gunnos saw her again in the Winners Tournament, Gunnos promised her that he will win for her father. Also in the Winners, Hanna and Kiku saw each other, Hanna said to Kiku that she knew Gunnos a long time before Kiku does. Hurting Kiku, and letting Kiku watch they're "engagement" and "wedding". Kiku ran away but promised Gunnos that she will return.
- Jeffrey the Kid: A-block round 1 player who specialized on speed. His specialty is ultra high speed rapid fire. He was defeated by Gray.
- The Black Roses of Midnight: A trio of A-block round 1 players that specializes on collaborative battle, with technique Beauty Rose. The trio were defeated by Kiba. Their move was unknown to Yamato until later on, when Armada told them. Later they joined Bedeaus and tries to stop Yamato and gang on their way to rescue Akyulus by using their newly obtained Death Cartridge system. This time they were defeated by Wen and Li using their Double Rapid fire attack.
- Killer M: A-block round 1 player, in the form of killer matsutake mushroom. His specialty is to "accidentally" knock down pillar that rival B-DaPlayer stood on. Killer M was defeated by Enjyu by knocking down Killer M's own pillar.
- Crab Gauger: A-block round 1 player, defeated by Killer M by shooting down the pillar.
- Jinbee (ジンベエ) / Jinbi: A shark-suited player in the B-block 2nd round, defeated by Liena in Battle Royal Hockey. Later on after being ignored by Yamato, he makes various attempts to defeat Yamato - even trying to poison him. When Yamato shows no reaction even after consuming a whole bottle of poison, Jinbee decides to try it himself and has to lock himself in a portable cubicle as a result. Jinbee's Strike Shot is the Impact Shot. When Jinbee joined Beadeus (Also called "Master Hefai" by his followers), he worked as a maid for Haja when Haja got well. He helped Haja in his every plan and also, backfiring it.

== Other media ==
A video game for the Game Boy Advance, titled simply Battle B-Daman, was developed by Takara and published by Atlus. It was released on July 25, 2006.
