= Splatoon (video game) =

2015 video game

- Developer: Nintendo EAD
- Publisher: Nintendo
- Directors: Yusuke Amano; Tsubasa Sakaguchi
- Producer: Hisashi Nogami
- Programmer: Shintaro Sato
- Artist: Seita Inoue
- Composers: Toru Minegishi; Shiho Fujii
- Series: Splatoon
- Platform: Wii U
- Release: JP: 28 May 2015; NA: 29 May 2015; EU: 29 May 2015; AU: 30 May 2015
- Genre: Third-person shooter
- Modes: Single-player, multiplayer

Splatoon (Note: Japanese: スプラトゥーン, Hepburn: Supuratūn) is a 2015 third-person shooter game developed and published by Nintendo for the Wii U. The game centers around player-controlled Inklings—squid-like creatures that can transform between humanoid and cephalopodic forms at will. The game centers on a variety of four-on-four online multiplayer game modes that sees Inklings use a variety of weapons that can produce and shoot ink while in their humanoid forms or tread through and hide in surfaces covered in their own ink while in their cephalopodic forms. It also includes a dedicated single-player story campaign.

Splatoon was developed by a young group of employees at Nintendo's Entertainment Analysis & Development (EPD) division, and originated from a competitive multiplayer ink-based territory control prototype game. Developers initially conceived its player characters as anthropomorphic rabbits, taking cues from their territorial tendencies in the real world. This idea was met with criticism from others around the company, who maintained that having rabbits shoot ink did not make inherent sense. This resulted in the team pivoting to squid-human hybrids and eventually characters that could transform between wholly humanoid and wholly cephalopodic forms. The visual characteristics of the squid characters, now named Inklings, were inspired by the mannerisms of skateboarders.

Splatoon received positive reviews, with critics praising Nintendo's decision to enter the genre with a new franchise, the game's overall style and presentation, gameplay mechanics, and its soundtrack. However, criticism was directed at the exclusion of voice chat and private lobbies, the small number of multiplayer maps at launch, and issues with online matchmaking. Nintendo provided post-release support for the game by adding new maps and weapons to the game, adding a feature to allow users to create private lobbies and holding time-limited events called "Splatfests". Splatoon was awarded and nominated for several year-end accolades from several gaming publications.

It spawned a multimedia franchise; a sequel, Splatoon 2, was released for the Nintendo Switch on 21 July 2017, followed by another sequel, Splatoon 3, which was released on the Nintendo Switch on 9 September 2022. On 8 April 2024, Nintendo shut down the Nintendo Network service, discontinuing official online play for the game.

== Gameplay ==
In Splatoon, players control "Inklings", characters which may either be male or female. Here, the player uses an Inkling in humanoid, or "kid" form to shoot colored ink across the map.

Splatoon is primarily a team-based third-person shooter that is playable by up to eight players in online four-versus-four matches, although the game also features local one-versus-one multiplayer matches and a single player campaign. Players control an Inkling, who have the ability to transform between humanoid and squid forms. In humanoid form, Inklings can shoot ink in their team's color, which can be used to cover the environment or "splat" opposing players or enemies. Transforming into a squid allows players to swim through the ink of their own color, even up walls and through grates, hiding from the enemy and replenishing their ink supply in the process. Conversely, enemy ink is much slower to walk across in humanoid form, cannot be swum through in squid form and gradually deals damage. Players can use their ink to try and "splat" their opponents, which will send them back to their team's starting point whilst also providing a large splat of ink. In all modes, except for the two-player mode, players can use the Wii U GamePad to view a map of the surroundings and instantly launch towards the location of another teammate, as well as use optional gyroscopic controls to assist with aiming.

Players go into matches wielding a primary ink weapon, each with differing statistics and traits, along with a secondary weapon (such as ink-filled balloons, sprinklers, and disruptive fields), and a special attack that can be charged up by covering enough ground with ink. Primary paint weapons range from those whose firing patterns resemble various types of firearms, to melee weapons such as Splat Rollers, Inkbrushes, and Sloshers (ink buckets). Ink weapons are sold in sets that can be purchased with money earned from matches, with more sets becoming available to the player as they gain experience. In addition, players can customize their character with headgear, clothes, and shoes from the neighboring shops, with more items becoming available as the player's level increases. Each item carries an ability that improves the player's statistics, such as faster respawn time or longer special duration. Additional abilities can be unlocked by gaining experience in battles. When encountering other players in the plaza, players can choose to order an item another player is wearing and purchase it the next day from the back alley dealer named Spyke for a higher price.

The game also supports Splatoon Amiibo figures, with each figure unlocking a set of missions which unlocks extra equipment (weapons and clothing) and a bonus minigame upon completion, the latter of which can be selected and played on the Wii U GamePad while waiting in lobbies. Players can also make posts to the game's Miiverse community, which appear in-game as graffiti on various buildings.

=== Multiplayer ===
Online multiplayer was split into regular (turf war) and ranked game types. Each of these match types went through a rotation of two maps, which changed every four hours. In ranked games, players gained or dropped ranks based on consecutive wins and losses, ranging from C− to S+. Having a higher rank increased the amount of money and experience earned after wins.

There were four modes (rule-sets) used for online matches, all of which needed two teams consisting of a maximum of four players each. Turf War was the only mode for regular matches. Ranked matches changed between Splat Zones, Tower Control, and Rainmaker.

- Turf War: Each team tries to ink the most turf as possible in their own color of ink within three minutes. The team that covers the most turf in their color ink when time runs out wins.
- Splat Zones (a king of the hill-style mode): Each team tries to control designated areas by keeping them covered in their ink; the team that achieves this get their counter value decreased at a constant rate. The team that has the lowest value on their counter wins.
- Tower Control: Each team tries to board the floating tower located at the center of the map. When a player boards the tower, it moves towards a target located at the end of the opponents' side of the map along a predetermined path. The team that had moved the tower closest to the opponents' side's target wins.
- Rainmaker (a capture the flag-style mode): Players on each team try to pick up the Rainmaker and carry it towards a target on the opponents' side of the map. Once the Rainmaker is picked up by a player, that player can drop the rainmaker only by getting splatted (killed) or going out-of-bounds. The Rainmaker can also be used as a weapon and does not use any ink. The team that had carried the Rainmaker closest to the opponents' side's target wins.

On April 8, 2024, online multiplayer was discontinued due to the shutdown of all online services for Wii U games, Splatoon included.

In Battle Dojo, the local multiplayer mode, two players compete to pop the most balloons, with one player using the Wii U GamePad and the other using the TV with a Wii U Pro Controller or Wii Classic Controller or either controller in conjunction with a MotionPlus-enabled Wii Remote to recreate the GamePad's gyroscopic controls.

Time-limited "Splatfest" events, held between June 2015 and July 2016, were also held in multiplayer play. During these events, players could choose between one of two teams, and earn points towards a player rank and their team based on their performance. Members of the winning team, decided by popularity and overall performance, earned Super Sea Snails, which could be used to re-spec and add additional perks to equipment, with the losing team earning fewer snails. Following the final Splatfest event, which ended on 24 July 2016, Super Sea Snails can be earned by winning a certain number of matches.

=== Campaign ===
Octo Valley is the game's single player campaign in which players are recruited by veteran and leader of the Squidbeak Splatoon, Cap'n Cuttlefish to rescue the Great Zapfish, Inkopolis' source of power, from the Octarians, a race of octopuses with whom the Inklings warred in a century-old territorial conflict known as the Great Turf War. Players use a default ink weapon for this mode, which can be enhanced with upgrades or power-ups by collecting Power Eggs littered across the campaign's levels. The goal of each level is to navigate through enemies and obstacles to reach and rescue the Zapfish at the end. Each level also contains a hidden "sunken scroll" which reveals backstories and lore surrounding the setting of Splatoon. After clearing all of the levels in an area, players fight a boss called an Octoweapon to proceed to the next. Clearing each boss unlocks blueprints that can be exchanged at an armory for more weapon options.

== Synopsis ==
=== Setting ===
The Splatoon series takes place 12,000 years into the far future on a post-apocalyptic Earth following the extinction of humans and virtually all other mammals, implied to be due to the effects of rampant climate change. Marine animals then evolve to reside on land and in the present day occupy the regions of Inkadia and the Splatlands. These include the Inklings and Octarians, terrestrial squids and octopuses respectively. The city of Inkopolis, which includes Splatoon's hub world Inkopolis Plaza, is located within Inkadia.

=== Plot ===
The Great Zapfish (a creature resembling an electrically charged catfish) that powers the city of Inkopolis suddenly vanishes; the incident is the subject of a news report hosted by resident idols Callie and Marie of the Squid Sisters. An Inkling teenager spots an elderly Inkling man scanning the immediate vicinity of Inkopolis Plaza from a manhole cover and follows him to Octo Valley. The elder Inkling, stationed at a camp in Octo Valley, introduces himself as Cap'n Cuttlefish, the former military captain of the Squidbeak Splatoon who led the Inklings to victory against the Octarians during the Great Turf War one century prior. Cuttlefish accuses the Octarians of stealing the Zapfish in revenge for their defeat. Cuttlefish recruits the teenage Inkling as Agent 3 of the New Squidbeak Splatoon, and tasks them with intercepting Octarian forces to retrieve the Zapfish. Along the way, Agent 3 combats gargantuan foes known as the Great Octoweapons.

Certain sunken scrolls scattered throughout Octo Valley detail the Great Turf War whose early battles were dominated by the Octarians. When the Octarians were ultimately bested, they were forcibly relocated into underground domes. In the present day, an energy crisis afflicts Octarian society as their settlements gradually lose power.

After defeating the third Octoweapon, Cuttlefish speaks to Agent 3 over radio but is kidnapped by an unseen individual. Heeding a distress call sent by Cuttlefish, Agents 1 and 2 of the New Squidbeak Splatoon introduce themselves to Agent 3, also over radio, and remotely assist them in reaching Cuttlefish. Agent 3 breaches the arena where the Zapfish and Cuttlefish are being held and is formally confronted by the individual who apprehended them both: DJ Octavio, Cuttlefish's wartime arch-rival and the leader of the Octarians. After Agent 3 pushes Octavio further into the arena, Agents 1 and 2 hijack Octavio's speaker system to play the Squid Sisters' song "Calamari Inkantation", freeing Cuttlefish and implicating themselves to be the Squid Sisters in disguise. Agent 3 manages to defeat Octavio in battle, liberating the Zapfish. The Zapfish's return is reported on to the public by the Squid Sisters, who claim ignorance to its original whereabouts.

== Development ==
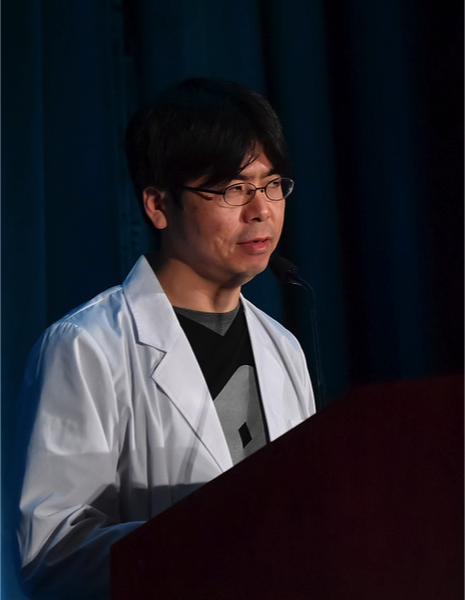
Producer Hisashi Nogami at the 2018 Game Developers Conference (GDC)

Splatoon was developed by Nintendo Entertainment Analysis & Development (EAD). Monolith Soft also assisted Nintendo on the development of the game. The team working on the game was composed of much younger members compared to most other teams in the company, and prior to Splatoon were all involved in the development of the Wii U console in some capacity.

Once production on the Wii U concluded, the team assembled to brainstorm ideas for "a new kind of game, without worrying about trying to fit into existing game genres". Over the course of six months, over 70 concepts were proposed. One such concept materialized into a playable prototype developed by team member Shintaro Sato. It involved an online four-versus-four territory control game set in a featureless arena; whichever team painted the majority of the map would be declared the winner. The player characters at this time were similarly featureless greyscale blocks that sprayed ink from their "noses"; the demo was internally nicknamed the "tofu prototype" due to the blocks' resemblance to the food. Players would view a real-time overhead map on their TV screens to keep track of opponents' movements while the Wii U GamePad was used to control a three-dimensional (3D) camera locked onto their "tofu". While the developers did not initially aim to make a shooter game specifically, the shooter format came about naturally out of the "methods [they] used to create a Nintendo-style action game."

The team wanted to include stealth elements to elevate the tension of combat, and had the "tofu" be able to hide in their ink. Despite this, they had trouble "filter[ing] it down" to a "simple, fun game". Video game designer Shigeru Miyamoto told the team that the game had "no appeal" in the current state. Afterwards, the team added 3D verticality to the maps. But since the game determined a winner by calculating how much of the floor was covered in ink from a top-down perspective, they realized there was no purpose in painting walls, resulting in discussions on whether to remove the feature.

=== Art and design ===
Concept artwork of the anthropomorphic rabbits that were originally going to be Splatoon's player characters before the creation of the Inklings.

Art director Seita Inoue sketched preliminary ideas for the game's final player characters, including humans, various animals, "macho men," robots, and Mario, the latter of which was included at Miyamoto's suggestion as a hypothetical last resort. The team settled on anthropomorphic rabbits for a number of reasons. Since the fur coats of rabbits could naturally be black or white, separating them into teams was fairly trivial, and they thought the neutral tones would contrast well with brightly colored ink. They also believed Splatoon's control-centric gameplay would reflect the animals' real-world territorial tendencies. Lastly, the characters' large ears made it easy to tell at any time which direction they were facing. Upon eliciting the opinions of other Nintendo development teams, Splatoon's developers were met with sharp criticism. The employees of said teams did not understand the logic behind having rabbits shoot and hide in ink, and felt that there was a sharp disconnect between the gameplay and presentation. Sakaguchi rationalized the feedback as less to do with the rabbits themselves and moreso about his team having not yet "found the key part of the game structure", prompting the developers to rethink their approach. They debated on whether to fall back on characters of pre-existing intellectual properties (IP). For instance, Yoshi was briefly proposed due to him normally coming in a variety of colors, but they encountered the same conceptual issues regarding him using ink as they had with the rabbits. Sakaguchi created a document that listed the essential form and functions any character would require to match the gameplay. They ultimately chose to base the characters on squids, which had been one of their earliest proposals, due to their natural association with spraying ink. Despite this, there exist remnants of the game's original rabbit-centric art direction in the final product, such as statues of a fox and raccoon in the game's hub world, as well as Judd, a domestic cat that oversees the results of Turf Wars. Judd was additionally repurposed to be the only surviving mammal in the game's present day.

==== Design of the Inklings ====
Since the team thought that squids were less conventionally appealing than rabbits, they struggled with character design. As the characters needed to be humanoid in some regard, they initially settled on anthropomorphic squid-human hybrids. This was scrapped when they decided that such characters "wouldn't sell". Director Yusuke Amano proposed they instead make the characters, now referred to as Inklings, be able to directly switch between a "human-like human" form and a "squid-like squid" form; this ability lent itself to more complex gameplay mechanics, such as swimming through ink or sustaining damage while maneuvering in enemy ink, which Miyamoto approved of. Additionally, allowing the characters to tread through ink validated the existence of paintable walls, solving the team's earlier conundrum. They were determined to make interesting sound effects, so they repeatedly pounded slime to create the sound of a squid diving into ink. At some point, they considered using urinals and sinks as warp points.

The final designs of the Inklings were, as Inoue stated, not "set up in isolation", being influenced by the game's primary setting of the "city streets". Finding that such realistic locales would be more engaging than "fantasy world[s]" like those of the Mario series, the Inklings were directly inspired by the mannerisms of skateboarders. Inoue took the characters' forms and silhouettes into consideration, and drew them as having a distinctly athletic build, their hips being wider than their shoulders. He designed them in the image of 17-year-olds, though they were ultimately aged down to 14. Their black eye masks were inspired by the dark makeup Inoue found typical of punk rock musicians, while their cepholopodic forms were drawn simply, made to be recognizable as "squids" at a glance.

The original plan was to include solely female Inklings, as few Nintendo games at the time featured female protagonists and developers felt that having "strong and active women" as the stars would be more appealing to overseas audiences. Male Inklings were designed later since developers presumed some players would better empathize with characters that matched their actual gender. The Inklings' hands were consciously made square-shaped as an allusion to squid noodles. They have 10 distinct appendages, as with real-world squids; four humanoid limbs, two strands of hair, and four strands of hair at the base of their neck. Unlike real squids, Inklings cannot survive in water and immediately dissolve upon contact. This quality was born out of a need to justify there being out-of-bounds regions in the game's multiplayer stages; water was deemed the only hazard that would reasonably be present in cities.

=== Worldbuilding and characters ===
In regards to the game's worldbuilding, producer Hisashi Nogami pictured Turf Wars as a "cool and rebellious" activity among Inklings, akin to skateboarding, and the game's soundtrack placed an emphasis on rock music to reinforce this idea. In-game clothing is based on street fashion because one of the developers was a fan of the style. Scattered throughout Splatoon's world in architecture and gear is a fictional language canonically employed by the Inklings. Although some of its text bear resemblance to real-world languages, developers have stated that the dialect itself is linguistically inconsistent, and its glyphs are treated more often as diegetic design elements unintended to be fully deciphered. Virtually all of Splatoon's music is sung in this language by in-universe music groups; according to Nogami, this was done to place emphasis on the songs' rhythmic qualities and give them a worldwide appeal.

Splatfests were conceptualized very early on as events that would "extend beyond the game itself" and help attract interest among social media users on platforms such as Twitter. Since players would be asked to choose between two opposing options, Inoue designed two contrasting characters that would back each side. These characters became Callie and Marie of the Squid Sisters. They were initially conceived as shrine maidens in charge of interpreting divine messages that would serve as the questions proposed during Splatfests. Since the team thought shrine maidens were "too formal" of occupations, they opted to make them idol musicians. Inoue pictured the duo having a "slightly edgy" and laid-back image as though they were up-and-coming celebrities, choosing to base them more on overseas singers than typical Japanese idols.

In creating Splatoon's single-player campaign, Nogami wanted to establish some kind of conflict and figured that a logical narrative foil to squids were octopuses, creating the Octarians. He also felt that the anatomical similarities between squids and octopuses made their battles for supremacy in the Great Turf War more believable. The characters of Agents 1 and 2, implied to be Callie and Marie in disguise, were included to unify the game's online and offline modes. The design of DJ Octavio, who wields sticks of wasabi, was inspired by takowasa, a Japanese dish combining octopus and wasabi. He was envisioned as a DJ because Inoue thought that DJs and street culture were a natural pair.

== Release ==
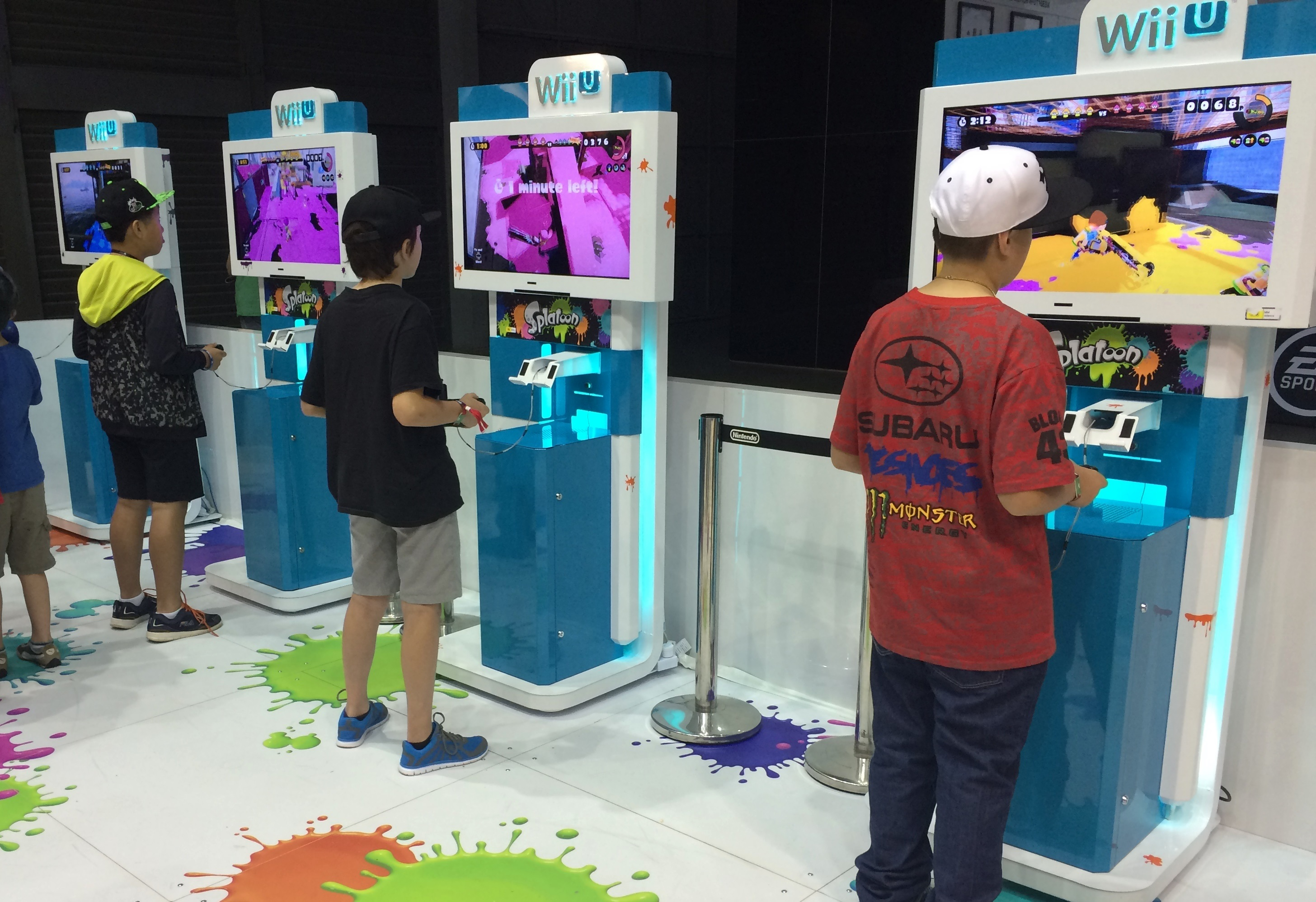
Attendees at the EB Games Expo play online matches of Splatoon.

Splatoon was revealed in a trailer during Nintendo's E3 2014 Digital Event video presentation, and a demo of its multiplayer mode was playable on the show floor; by this point, only 10% of the full game had been completed. The game's single-player campaign was further detailed in a later Nintendo Direct. Prior to the game's release, a time-limited multiplayer demo known as the "Global Testfire" was held on 8 and 9 May 2015 and one two-hour block on 23 May 2015. On 15 May, on the Santa Monica Pier in Santa Monica, California, Nintendo held a special event called the Splatoon Mess Fest, featuring celebrities and an obstacle course inspired by the game. Fans could also play a demo of the game at the event. A collaboration with Masahiro Anbe's Squid Girl manga series was announced, which included free in-game costumes released on 6 August 2015. Splatoon outfits are also featured in the Nintendo 3DS title, Girls Mode 3: Kirakira ☆ Code. In Canada, Splatoon-themed frozen yogurt was produced at various Yogurty's locations from June to September. Nintendo UK partnered with Adrenaline Alley skatepark to decorate it with decals and props based on the game and install several Wii U demo stations for the summer. Nintendo also held fan-art competitions on Miiverse and Twitter.

Wii U Deluxe Set bundles with Splatoon included were released in North America at Best Buy stores (as a coupon for a digital copy) Australia, Europe, and New Zealand (on a physical disc). Splatoon series Amiibo were released alongside the game, with Boy and Girl Inklings sold separately and a Squid figure sold exclusively as a bundle with either the game or the two other Amiibo. Amiibo figures of in-game pop idols Callie and Marie—collectively known as the "Squid Sisters"—were released in Japan on 7 July 2016 and internationally on 8 July 2016, along with limited edition recolors of the Inkling Boy, Girl and Squid Amiibo; the Callie and Marie Amiibo unlock in-game music players featuring their songs. Players who pre-ordered the game at GameStop received a download voucher for Splatoon-themed Mii costumes for use in Super Smash Bros. for Nintendo 3DS and Wii U. A bundle containing Splatoon and Super Smash Bros. for Nintendo 3DS and Wii U was announced in a November 2015 Nintendo Direct and was released during the holiday season. Nintendo released a Splatoon Wii U Deluxe Set containing the amiibo figures in Japan on 7 July 2016. In addition, Nintendo launched two new diorama sets based solely on Splatoon and its characters around the same time in Japan.

In the United Kingdom, a truck containing a shipment of special edition copies of the game was hijacked in transit, resulting in GAME having to cancel all their special edition pre-orders.

Additional modes, along with new maps and weapons, were introduced to the game through timed updates. An August 2015 update raised the level cap from 20 to 50, added S and S+ ranks to ranked battles, introduced new Splatling and Slosher weapons, private lobbies and party play, and added over 40 new pieces of gear items. In July 2016, Nintendo announced that the United Kingdom would host a splat-off between 16 July through 7 August 2016.

In December 2015, it was announced that free downloadable content would conclude in January 2016, although Nintendo later announced that downloadable content will continue to be released. After the version 2.9.0 update, released on 5 July 2016, the game stopped receiving further content updates. Additionally, Nintendo announced that Splatoon's online services will continue to be active, despite the game's final Splatfest having occurred on 22 July 2016.

In March 2023, Nintendo halted online play for Mario Kart 8 and Splatoon due to a vulnerability. The issue was fixed and online play resumed on 3 August 2023. Nintendo further stated that if further issues occurred, online play may be discontinued for the games. On 4 October 2023, Nintendo announced that online services for most Wii U and Nintendo 3DS software would end by April 2024, including Splatoon. The shut down was later specified to 8 April 2024, at 4 pm PDT.

== Reception ==
Reception

Aggregate score
Aggregator	Score
Metacritic	81/100

Review scores
Publication	Score
Destructoid	8.5/10
Edge	9/10
Electronic Gaming Monthly	8/10
Eurogamer	Essential
Famitsu	36/40
Game Informer	7.75/10
GameRevolution	4/5
GameSpot	8/10
GamesRadar+	3.5/5
GamesTM	7/10
GameTrailers	8.4/10
Giant Bomb	4/5
Hardcore Gamer	4/5
IGN	7.9/10 (original review); 8.6/10 (re-review)
Nintendo Life	9/10
Nintendo World Report	9/10
Polygon	8.5/10
The Guardian	4/5
USgamer	4/5
VentureBeat	83/100
VideoGamer.com	7/10

Splatoon received positive reviews, receiving an aggregated score of 81/100 on Metacritic based on 88 reviews.

Splatoon was well-received when it was revealed. Many in the gaming press were surprised that Nintendo was creating a shooter intellectual property and praised the new gameplay ideas that distinguished it from other titles in the genre.

GamesRadar gave the game 3.5/5 stars, praising the game's refreshing take on the shooter genre, while criticising some elements such as lobbies and amiibo-locked content. GameTrailers gave the game a score of 8.4/10, praising the game's mechanics and presentation, while lamenting that the game felt sparse at launch. IGN initially scored the game 7.9, praising the gameplay but criticizing the low number of maps and modes at launch and absence of voice chat. After several major updates were released, IGN released a re-review, increasing the game's score to 8.6/10 because of the new maps and online modes. Some critics expressed displeasure over the fact that communication errors cause a loss of points in Ranked Battles. Destructoid gave the game a score of 8.5, arguing that its shortcomings "can be forgiven in [his] mind because of how damn fun it is." Nintendo Life scored the game nine stars out of ten, considering Splatoon one of the "most fun" online games available because of the unique way each online match played out due to the ink mechanic, which also helped counteract potential boredom from the low number of maps playable at launch.

Writing for The Guardian, Kate Gray praised the visual style of Splatoon for contrasting realistic shooter games such as the Call of Duty franchise with a "90s cartoon aesthetic", citing influence by games such as Jet Set Radio, Super Mario Sunshine, and de Blob, along with a catchy soundtrack. However, Gray noted shortcomings in the game, such as a lack of multiplayer maps and modes on-launch making the game feel repetitive, matchmaking issues (such as inconsistent wait times between matches and team composition issues), as well as the lack of features such as voice chat and private lobbies, but defending the criticism by arguing that it was "[Nintendo's] first game in a long time that's really attempted to revitalize and reinvent a genre that often seems stagnant. This sort of daring creative venture will have its flaws, and if anything, we should be glad that it's Nintendo taking the first step into new territory." Gray concluded by declaring Splatoon to be "a breath of fresh air—or more accurately 'splodge of fresh ink'—for those who like to shoot stuff, but have grown tired of the endless bloody churn of gritty, realistic shooters."

=== Sales ===
Splatoon debuted at No. 2 in the UK software sales chart in the week it launched, only behind The Witcher 3: Wild Hunt. It is the fifth fastest-selling Wii U game and the fastest-selling new intellectual property on the console in that country, beating the previous record set by Ubisoft's 2012 launch title ZombiU. Splatoon debuted at the top of the Japanese software sales chart, with over 144,000 retail copies sold in its launch week and a total of 1.53 million sold by December 2016. In the U.S., 165,000 combined physical and downloaded copies were sold in May 2015, with another 290,000 sold in June and 85,000 in July. By the end of August 2015, over 600,000 copies had been sold in the region. In March 2016, Nintendo announced that one million copies had been shipped in Europe. By the end of June 2015, 1.62 million copies of the game had been sold worldwide, and by the end of October 2018, worldwide sales reached 4.95 million. In May 2016, Splatoon was announced to be the most successful new home console intellectual property (IP) in Japan since Wii Sports. The game's soundtrack album debuted at number two on Billboard Japan's Hot Albums chart and was number 46 on the chart's 2015 year-end list.

=== Awards ===
Year	Awards	Category	Results	Ref.
2015	British Academy Children's Awards	Best Game	Won	
2015	33rd Golden Joystick Awards	Best Family Game	Won	
2015	33rd Golden Joystick Awards	Best Multiplayer Game	Nominated	
2015	33rd Golden Joystick Awards	Best Nintendo Game	Won	
2015	33rd Golden Joystick Awards	Best Original Game	Nominated	
2015	33rd Golden Joystick Awards	Best Visual Design	Nominated	
2015	The Game Awards 2015	Best Family Game	Nominated	
2015	The Game Awards 2015	Best Multiplayer	Won	
2015	The Game Awards 2015	Best Shooter	Won	
2016	19th Annual D.I.C.E. Awards	Action Game of the Year	Nominated	
2016	19th Annual D.I.C.E. Awards	Outstanding Achievement in Online Gameplay	Nominated	
2016	Game Developers Choice Awards	Game of the Year	Honorable mention	
2016	Game Developers Choice Awards	Best Audio	Honorable mention	
2016	Game Developers Choice Awards	Best Design	Nominated	
2016	Game Developers Choice Awards	Innovation Award	Nominated	
2016	Game Developers Choice Awards	Best Technology	Honorable mention	
2016	Game Developers Choice Awards	Best Visual Art	Nominated	
2016	SXSW Gaming Awards	Most Promising New Intellectual Property	Won	
2016	12th British Academy Games Awards	Multiplayer	Nominated	
2016	12th British Academy Games Awards	Game Innovation	Nominated	
2016	12th British Academy Games Awards	Original Property	Nominated	
2016	Japan Game Awards	Game of the Year	Won	

== Media ==
An artbook for the game titled the Art of Splatoon was released in Japan in September 2015, and in North America and Europe in June 2017. Toy water guns modeled after an in-game weapon were released by Jakks Pacific in 2017.

In 2016, a series of real-life virtual concerts featuring the Squid Sisters, known as "Squid Sisters Live" and appearing as holograms, were held at Tokaigi 2016 (Makuhari Messe) in January, Choukagi 2016 in April, Japan Expo (Paris) in July, and Niconico Cho Party in November.

Splatoon has been adapted into a manga series, which is written and illustrated by Sankichi Hinodeya. It began serialization in Bessatsu CoroCoro Comic in February 2016, and launched in CoroCoro Comic on 15 May 2017. It has also been published in English by Viz Media. CoroCoro Comic gave free access to the entire series for a limited time from 22 June – 13 July 2018.
