= Keshikasu-kun =

ケシカスくん
- Genre: Gag comedy
- Manga
- Written by: Noriyuki Murase
- Published by: Shogakukan
- Magazine: CoroCoro Comic
- Original run: June 2004 – May 2011
- Volumes: 10
- Anime television series
- Studio: ShoPro
- Original network: Oha Coliseum
- Original run: January 4, 2010 – March 30, 2013
- Episodes: 44

Keshikasu-kun Battle Kastival
- Developer: Inti Creates
- Publisher: Konami
- Platform: Nintendo DS
- Release: JP: July 15, 2010
- Modes: Single-player, multiplayer

Keshikasu-kun (ケシカスくん; "Eraser Crumb-kun") is a Japanese children's manga written and illustrated by Noriyuki Murase (村瀬範行 Murase Noriyuki). It has been serialized in Monthly CoroCoro Comic from June 2004 to March 2011.

The series is about a white eraser who becomes Keshikasu-kun by putting an eraser crumb on his head and a paper costume on his body. Keshikasu-kun wants to become the best of the stationery supplies, outdoing other characters such as the blackboard eraser (kokuban-keshi) and the correction fluid (shūseieki).

Beginning in 2008 Keshikasu-kun appeared in the television program Oha Coliseum (おはコロシアム). Keshikasu-kun received the Shogakukan Manga Award in the children's category in 2008.

The January 2010 issue of Monthly Coro Coro Comic, released on December 15, 2009, revealed that an anime adaptation, classified by Shogakukan-Shueisha Productions as a television program, had been approved.

The anime aired for 44 episodes from 2010 to 2013.

A videogame called Keshikasu-kun Battle Kastival was released by Konami in 2010.

== Characters ==
- Keshikasu (ケシカス) - The white eraser
- Bōzu (ボウズ) - The student boy who is the owner of Keshikasu
- Enpitsu (エンピツ) - The pencil
- Chibikasu (チビカス) - The white eraser who is Keshikasu's young brother
- Shūseieki (修正液) - The correction fluid
- Kokuban Keshi (黒板消し) - The blackboard eraser
