= CoroCoro Comic =

Japanese manga magazine

- Monthly CoroCoro Comic (September 1983 issue)
- Categories: Children's manga
- Frequency: Monthly
- Circulation: 220,033; (July–September 2026)
- First issue: 1977
- Company: Shogakukan
- Country: Japan
- Based in: Tokyo
- Language: Japanese
- Website: corocoro.jp

CoroCoro Comic (Japanese: コロコロコミック, Hepburn: KoroKoro Komikku) is a Japanese children's manga magazine published by Shogakukan. It was established in 1977 and several of its properties, like Doraemon and the Pokémon series of games, have gone on to be cultural phenomena in Japan.

The name comes from a phenomime korokoro (ころころ) which means "rolling" and also represents something spherical, fat, or small, because children supposedly like such things. The magazine is A5-sized, about 6 cm (2 1/4 in) thick, and each issue is 750 pages long. CoroCoro Comic is released monthly with new issues on the 15th of each month (or earlier if the 15th falls on a weekend). CoroCoro Comic sold 400 million copies as of April 2017, making it one of the best-selling comic/manga magazines.

The magazine has three sisters: Bessatsu CoroCoro Comic (別冊コロコロコミック), CoroCoro Ichiban! (コロコロイチバン) and CoroCoro Aniki (コロコロアニキ). Bessatsu and Ichiban! are published bi-monthly, while Aniki, which targeted an older audience, was released quarterly. On November 20, 2020, CoroCoro Comic cover designer Tariji Sasaki was recognized by Guinness World Records as the longest-running cover designer for a children's magazine. CoroCoro Aniki ended publication in March 2021.

== History ==
The magazine was launched in 1977 as a magazine for Doraemon, which is one of the most popular manga in Japan. Before then Doraemon had been serialized in 6 Shogakukan magazines targeted at students in elementary school, that target audience has now increased. It collected stories of Doraemon from these magazines. It celebrated its 30th anniversary in 2007 with an exhibition at the Kyoto International Manga Museum.

== Tie-ins ==
CoroCoro regularly promotes toys and video games related to their manga franchises, releasing stories and articles featuring them. Pocket Monsters/Pokémon's big success in Japan owes to this in a way; the Game Boy game Pocket Monsters Blue was sold exclusively through the magazine at first, which helped CoroCoro's sales as well. CoroCoro is also often a source of information about upcoming Pokémon games and movies.

Other successful tie-ins include:

- Radio controlled car, Mini 4WD (with Tamiya)
- Famicom, Super Famicom, and Game Boy line (with Nintendo and third parties)
- Beyblade, B-Daman (with Takara)
- Bikkuriman (with Lotte)
- Barcode Battler (with Epoch Co.)

== Manga series currently being serialized ==
=== Manga titles currently serialized in Monthly CoroCoro Comic ===
- Super Mario-kun (Since November 1990)
- Pocket Monsters / Pocket Monsters SPECIAL (Since April 1996)
- CoroCoro Manga College (Since February 2001)
- Fujiko F. Fujio Masterpiece Theater Doraemon (Since April 2002)
- Denjyarasu Jiisan Jya! (Since April 2010)
- Liar! Gokuo-kun (Since October 2011)
- Danball Senki Wars (Since April 2013)
- Danchi Tomoo 4-koma Park (Since September 2013)
- 100% Pascal-sensei (Since January 2015)
- Splatoon (Since June 2016)
- Black Channel (Since April 2020)
- Maizen Sisters (Since November 2022)
- Ace Angler: Fishing Spirits (Since December 2022)
- Beyblade X (Since June 2023)
- Fate Rewinder (Since January 2022)
- Sonic and the Blade of Courage (Since June 2025)

=== Manga titles currently serialized in Bessatsu CoroCoro Comic ===
- Super Mario-kun (Since February 1991)
- Pokémon Pocket Monsters (Since February 1997)
- Denjyarasu Jiisan Jya! (Since June 2010)
- Duel Masters Victory (Since June 2011)
- Animal Crossing: New Leaf (Since October 2012)
- Lapis Lazuli (Since October 2012)
- Big Gathering! We are Oreca! (Since December 2012)
- Pokémon Torretta (Since February 2013)
- A Penguin's Troubles Plus (Since April 2013)
- Friendship Attached! Foot Burst (Since April 2013)
- Nyaemon (Since April 2013)
- Really!! Majime-kun! (Since June 2013)
- Super Conversion War Mojibakeru G Beat! (Since June 2013)
- Story of Duel Masters: Outrage (Since June 2013)
- Cosmos Stamp (Since August 2013)
- Orecabattle Oreca-Monsters Adventure-Retsuden (Since October 2013)
- Puniru Is a Cute Slime (Since March 2022)

=== Manga titles currently serialized in CoroCoro Ichiban ===
- Super Refreshing TV Life: Oha Suta Boy (Since November 2005)
- Pokémon 4-koma Gag Picture book (Since November 2009)
- Detective Conan Special (Since May 2011)
- Super Mario-kun Theater (Since April 2013)
- Animal Crossing: New Leaf (Since July 2013)
- Yo-kai Watch Yoncoma Pun Club (Since April 2015)
- Secret Society Eagle Talon (Since January 2016)
- Chibi Kasu-kun (Since May 2016)
- Hoshi no Kirby Everything on Today's Diary (Since July 2016)
- Pokémon Special Sun•Moon Saga (Since January 2017)
- Pokémon TCG Sun•Moon Saga (Since January 2017)
- Star Kirby Puzzle Planet (Since January 2017)

== Formerly serialized manga ==
This is a list of all manga that had been serialized by CoroCoro Comic at one point, but currently no longer.

=== 1960s ===
- Kaibutsu-kun
- Doraemon

=== 1970s ===
- Game Center Arashi

=== 1980s ===
- Bikkuriman
- Oyaji-chan
- Dash! Yonkuro
- Ganbare, Kickers!
- Honō no Dōkyūji: Dodge Danpei
- Perman
- Mashin Hero Wataru

=== 1990s ===
- Saru Get You
- Beyblade
- Crash Bandicoot
- Donkey Kong
- DoReMi Fantasy
- Duel Masters
- Honō no Tōkyūji: Dodge Danpei
- Kirby of the Stars: The Story of Dedede Who Lives in Pupupu
- Bakusō Kyōdai Let's & Go!!
- Ore wa Otoko da! Kunio-kun (manga based on the Kunio-kun series)
- Pokémon Blue (Japan)
- Small Soldiers
- Spyro The Dragon
- Speed Racer
- Star Wars: Episode I – The Phantom Menace
- Super B-Daman
- Super Bomberman
- Super Mario-kun
- Tamagotchi
- Zoids

=== 2000s ===
- Battle B-Daman
- Bomberman Jetters
- Crash B-Daman
- Croket!
- Dorabase
- Denjyarasu Jiisan
- Hidemaru the Soccer Boy - Adapted into the anime Forza! Hidemaru
- Inazuma Eleven
- Jak x Daxter ~Itachi de Waruika!!~
- Keshikasu-kun
- Kiyohara-kun
- Mushiking: The King of Beetles
- Rockman EXE
- Solar Boy Django
- Pokémon Diamond and Pearl
- Ratchet & Clank – Gagaga! Ginga no Gakeppuchi Densetsu
- Shooting Star Rockman
- Shippuu Tengoku Kaze no Klonoa
- Sonic! Dash & Spin
- I'm Galileo!
- Kirby of the Stars
- Kirby of the Stars! Moretsu Pupupu Hour!
- Metal Fight Beyblade
- Pokémon Platinum
- Pokémon HeartGold and SoulSilver
- Pokémon Colosseum
- Sap-kun
- Mysterious Joker

=== 2010s ===
- Baku Tech! Bakugan
- Cross Fight B-daman
- Danball Senki
- Denjyarasu Jiisan Jya!
- Future Card Buddyfight
- Hero Bank
- Inazuma Eleven: Ares no Tenbin
- Metal Fight Beyblade ZeroG
- Pokémon Black and White
- Pokémon Black and White 2
- Pokémon X and Y
- Puzzle & Dragons
- Kamiwaza Wanda
- Splatoon
- Minions
- Rich Police Cash!
- Yōkai Watch

=== 2020s ===
- Doraemon
- Schau Lof
- Hagemaru Reboot
- Makycu N-Zoch
- Zip Zap
- Pokémon
- Shikkoku no Harinezumi: Shadow the Hedgehog

== Circulation ==
Year / Period	Monthly circulation	Magazine sales
1987	1,400,000	16,800,000
1988	1,100,000	13,200,000
1989	1,100,000	13,200,000
1990	880,000	10,560,000
1991	600,000	7,200,000
1992	670,000	8,040,000
1993	500,000	6,000,000
1994	450,000	5,400,000
1995	630,000	7,560,000
1996	1,350,000	16,200,000
1997	1,800,000	21,600,000
1998	1,650,000	19,800,000
1999	1,260,000	15,120,000
2000	1,240,000	14,880,000
2001	1,260,000	15,120,000
2002	1,260,000	15,120,000
2003	1,350,000	16,200,000
2004	1,270,000	15,240,000
2005	1,090,000	13,080,000
January 2006 to August 2006	963,334	7,706,672
September 2006 to August 2007	932,500	11,190,000
September 2007 to August 2008	885,000	10,620,000
September 2008 to August 2009	911,667	10,940,004
September 2009 to August 2010	950,834	11,410,008
September 2010 to August 2011	837,500	10,050,000
October 2011 to September 2012	697,917	8,375,004
October 2012 to September 2013	595,000	7,140,000
October 2013 to September 2014	768,334	9,220,008
October 2014 to September 2015	1,014,167	12,170,004
October 2015 to September 2016	840,833	10,089,996
October 2016 to March 2017	803,333	4,819,998
April 2017 to June 2017	776,667	2,330,001
July 2017 to September 2017	763,333	2,289,999
October 2017 to September 2018	757,500	9,090,003
October 2018 to September 2019	621,667	7,460,004
May 1977 to September 2018		418,840,006

== Rivals ==
Corocoro has had many rival magazines in the past, with one of them, Comic Bom Bom, closing down due to declining sales. The current competition includes V Jump and Saikyo Jump.

=== Past rivals ===
- Shōnen Challenge (January 1979–February 1982)
- 100-Point Comic (January 1981–January 1983)
- Comic Bom Bom (November 1981–December 2007)
- One-Pack Comic (November 1985–January 1989)
- Comic Bun-Bun (January 2004–October 2009)
- Kerokero Ace (December 2007–September 2013)

=== Current rivals ===
- V Jump (since June 1993)
- Monthly Shōnen Ace (since December 1994)
- Saikyō Jump (since January 2012)

== Foreign adaptations ==
- CO-CO! (Hong Kong)
- CoroCoro Monthly (Taiwan)
- Dragon Comic CORO-CORO (China)

== See also ==
- Weekly Shōnen Sunday
- Weekly Shōnen Jump
