= Atsumare! Fushigi Kenkyū-bu =

Japanese manga series

- First tankōbon volume cover

あつまれ！ふしぎ研究部
- Genre: Comedy
- Manga
- Written by: Masahiro Anbe
- Published by: Akita Shoten
- Magazine: Weekly Shōnen Champion
- Original run: September 29, 2016 – July 18, 2024
- Volumes: 20

Atsumare! Fushigi Kenkyū-bu (あつまれ！ふしぎ研究部; "Gather! Mystery Research Club") is a Japanese manga series written and illustrated by Masahiro Anbe. It was serialized in Akita Shoten's shōnen manga magazine Weekly Shōnen Champion from September 2016 to July 2024, with its chapters collected in 20 tankōbon volumes.

== Publication ==
Written and illustrated by Masahiro Anbe, Atsumare! Fushigi Kenkyū-bu was serialized in Akita Shoten's shōnen manga magazine Weekly Shōnen Champion from September 29, 2016, to July 18, 2024. Akita Shoten has collected its chapters in 20 tankōbon volumes, released from April 7, 2017, to October 8, 2024.

=== Volumes ===
No.	Release date	ISBN
1	April 7, 2017	978-4-253-22821-3
2	September 7, 2017	978-4-253-22822-0
3	February 8, 2018	978-4-253-22823-7
4	July 6, 2018	978-4-253-22824-4
5	December 7, 2018	978-4-253-22825-1
6	May 8, 2019	978-4-253-22826-8
7	September 6, 2019	978-4-253-22827-5
8	February 7, 2020	978-4-253-22828-2
9	August 6, 2020	978-4-253-22829-9
10	December 8, 2020	978-4-253-22830-5
11	April 8, 2021	978-4-253-22831-2
12	September 8, 2021	978-4-253-22832-9
13	March 8, 2022	978-4-253-22833-6
14	July 7, 2022	978-4-253-22834-3
15	November 8, 2022	978-4-253-22835-0
16	April 7, 2023	978-4-253-22836-7
17	August 8, 2023	978-4-253-22837-4
18	January 5, 2024	978-4-253-22838-1
19	June 7, 2024	978-4-253-22839-8
20	October 8, 2024	978-4-253-22840-4
