= Splatoon =

Video game series

- Genre: Third-person shooter
- Developers: Nintendo EAD (2015); Nintendo EPD (2017–present)
- Publisher: Nintendo
- Creators: Hisashi Nogami; Shintaro Sato
- Composers: Toru Minegishi; Shiho Fujii; Ryo Nagamatsu
- Platforms: Wii U; Nintendo Switch; Nintendo Switch 2
- First release: Splatoon; 28 May 2015
- Latest release: Splatoon Raiders; 23 July 2026

Splatoon (Note: Japanese: スプラトゥーン, Hepburn: Supuratūn) is a third-person shooter video game franchise developed and published by Nintendo. It is set far in the future on a post-apocalyptic Earth that has been repopulated with evolved marine life and centers around a pair of humanoid races derived from cephalopods known as Inklings and Octolings—squids and octopuses respectively—which can morph between humanoid and cephalopodic forms at will. They often battle one another in competitive sport, using a multitude of weapons that produce and shoot ink while in their humanoid forms or swim through and hide in their own ink while in their cephalopodic forms.

The first game in the series, Splatoon, was released for the Wii U on 28 May 2015. A sequel, Splatoon 2, was released for the Nintendo Switch on 21 July 2017, followed by an expansion pack, Octo Expansion, on 13 June 2018. A third game, Splatoon 3, was released on 9 September 2022, followed by an expansion pack titled Side Order, on 22 February 2024. A spin-off game, Splatoon Raiders, was released on 23 July 2026 as an exclusive for the Nintendo Switch 2.

The series has sold over 30 million copies and received positive reviews for its art direction, gameplay mechanics, and soundtrack. Splatoon has spawned numerous collaborations with third-party companies and established its own esports tournament circuit in 2018. It has spawned a manga series as well as holographic music concerts, primarily in Japan.

== Gameplay ==
Aerial view of an ongoing Turf War match on the stage Mincemeat Metalworks, introduced in Splatoon 3 (2022). The usage of ink to both exert map control and facilitate movement across a battle arena is a key facet of the Splatoon series' multiplayer gameplay.

The Splatoon series consists of third-person shooters with a focus on competitive online multiplayer across several game modes. Players select a range of weapons that they use to spread ink across the floors and walls of an arena and to damage enemies. During gameplay, players control characters named Inklings and Octolings, based on squids and octopuses respectively, that can both freely alternate between a humanoid "kid" form and a cepholopodic "swim" form. (Note: Prior to Octolings' inclusion as playable avatars, this was officially referred to as the "squid" form.) While in humanoid form they can use their weapons to spread ink across surfaces and damage enemy players. While in swim form, players can submerge and tread through their own team's ink. Additionally, players can only replenish their ammunition by standing or swimming in their respective ink color. During matches, players can activate communication signals directed to their team, those being "This Way!" and "Booyah!" Players can also instantaneously launch themselves towards a teammate or their team's spawn region, an action known as "super jumping", by selecting the desired target through an in-match menu.

In the first Splatoon, players could pick a multitude of weapons belonging to one of seven distinct weapon classes: Shooters, Chargers, Rollers, Splatlings, Brushes, Blasters, and Sloshers. With the release of Splatoon 2, the Dualie and Brella classes were added to the roster. Splatoon 3 introduced the Stringer and Splatana classes, making for a total of eleven weapon types across the franchise. Each base weapon is assigned a loadout of one "sub weapon" and one "special weapon". Sub weapons are usually defensive structures or offensive projectiles, and require a large amount of ink to dispense, while special weapons are powerful armaments whose Special Gauge must be charged by painting the surrounding area.

Players can equip numerous perks that passively aid gameplay. These perks, known as abilities, can range from speeding up respawn time, reducing the amount of ink consumed by sub weapons, and upgrading the damage performed by special weapons. Abilities are attached to cosmetic gear items, which are separated into three categories: headgear, clothing, and shoes. Each clothing item has one main ability slot and a maximum of three secondary subslots. The number of subslots available is dependent on the respective gear's "star power", which can be increased with consumables known as "super sea snails" or in-game currency. At the end of a match, in accordance with how many experience points were gained during the battle, a random "sub" ability is assigned if possible. Subslots can be re-rolled or entirely removed ("scrubbed") by trading in-game currency with certain vendors. Players can manually apply any ability to a given slot, primary or secondary, by speaking with said vendors and spending "ability chunks".

=== Turf War ===
"Turf War" is one of the main gameplay modes in the Splatoon franchise. It involves two teams of four players (Note: An alternative arrangement was introduced in Splatoon 3 as a Splatfest-exclusive gamemode. Named "Tricolor Turf War", it instead involves one larger team of four defending against two smaller teams of two.) on either side of a symmetrical map competing to spread their team's ink across as much of the floor space of the map as possible before the match ends after three minutes. While players are not awarded points for doing so, it is possible to kill enemy players, referred to as "splatting", to temporarily remove them from the game so that they cannot contest the spread of ink until they respawn.

=== Ranked Battles ===
Another online offering present in all installments is "Ranked Battles", (Note: Referred to as "Anarchy Battles" in Splatoon 3.) available only to players level 10 and above. These consist of alternative modes focusing on competitive, teamwork-oriented gameplay. Over the course of the series, four distinct Ranked modes have been introduced, those being Splat Zones, Tower Control, Rainmaker, and Clam Blitz. The accessibility of the modes at a given moment are dependent on rulesets that rotate at fixed intervals throughout the day. Ranked modes utilize skill-based matchmaking; players are grouped together based on a shared letter-based "rank" that reflects their in-game aptitude level.

- Splat Zones plays similarly to king of the hill; players must exert control over one or two designated regions, named "splat zones", for a set amount of time. This is achieved by spraying the zone with at least 70% of their team's ink color. Iv there are two zones in contention, both must be controlled simultaneously by the same team to deplete their timers. If a team steals control over the zone(s) from their opponent, said opponent is imposed the penalty of an additional timer that itself must also be depleted. Overtime is initiated when the losing team remains in command of the zone(s) when the overall five minutes elapses, and ends immediately after said team either surpasses the opposing side or loses control.
- Tower Control has players compete to stay atop of a moving structure, the "tower", which is by default positioned in the middle of the map. If the tower is currently being ridden by a team, it moves along a preset path that leads to a final goal located in the opposition's base. Starting with Splatoon 2, the tower must first clear numerous checkpoints dotted throughout the path before it can reach the goal. If a team transports the tower to the goal before five minutes elapses, a situation known as a "knockout", the match ends early and awards them bonus points; otherwise, whichever team pushed the tower the furthest is determined the victor.
- Rainmaker's objective is for teams to transport a large weapon, the titular "Rainmaker", to a pedestal on the opposing team's base; it plays similar to capture the flag. The Rainmaker is normally situated in the middle of the map, where players must destroy its protective shield and have one teammate physically grab it. If a player is splatted while they are carrying the Rainmaker, the weapon and its shield reappears at the player's site of death, at which point it may be retrieved by either team. If the shield is destroyed but the Rainmaker is not grabbed in time, it disappears and spawns at its default location in the map's center. Additionally, if the wielding player remains in possession of the Rainmaker for too long, the Rainmaker explodes, splatting said player and resetting to the center. Checkpoints were added to the mode in Splatoon 3.
- Clam Blitz is an invasion game that has each team, both starting with 100 points, compete to collect golden clams scattered throughout the map with the objective of hurling them into spherical baskets, found in their opponent's base, to deduct their own points counter. If a player collects eight clams, (Note: Ten clams in Splatoon 2) a Power Clam, shaped like a gridiron football, is generated, which needs to be thrown into the enemy's basket to puncture its protective barrier. In this state of vulnerability that lasts for a maximum of ten seconds, the attacking team must throw regular clams into the basket to reset this window and deplete their points to zero, whereupon the attacking team wins. If, by the end of the five minutes, neither team has scored, overtime is initiated for a maximum of three additional minutes. If after this period both teams have yet to score, whichever team generated the most Power Clams throughout the course of the game is deemed the winner.

=== Splatfests ===
"Splatfests" are limited-time, recurring events that also take place in-universe. During Splatfests, players are asked a question and pick a team based on the answer that they chose, with each team being backed by a particular in-game idol character. In Splatoon and Splatoon 2, players are given two choices relating to a random theme. The themes are usually in the form of preference questionnaires (e.g. cats vs. dogs, mayonnaise vs. ketchup), but can also cover other topics, such as paradoxes (e.g. chicken or the egg). In Splatoon 3, there are instead three sides to choose from (e.g. bread vs. rice vs. pasta). Aside from the typical original questions, Splatfests may sometimes be part of a real-life corporate partnership (such as a Transformers-themed Splatfest with Hasbro, the Teenage Mutant Ninja Turtles and SpongeBob SquarePants-themed ones with Nickelodeon, McDonald's, Sanrio, Meiji, and Pocky) or sponsorship with Nintendo's own properties (such as Pokémon, The Legend of Zelda, Super Smash Bros. Ultimate, and Super Mario). After picking a team, players compete in a series of Turf War matches and contribute their endgame points, accumulated in the form of the "clout" statistic, their respective side. Upon the Splatfest's conclusion, an overarching scoring system decides the winning team based on the overall clout of those who played across various categories.

In most Splatfests, the outcome tends to only affect the player's level of in-game reward at the end of the event and typically have no impact on the overall playability of the game. However, an exception is the "final Splatfest" of each game, which has traditionally marked the end of developer support. Developers insinuated that the outcome of the last Splatfest in Splatoon, "Callie vs. Marie", affected the story mode of Splatoon 2, in which the losing protagonist Callie became an antagonist. This was later confirmed after Splatoon 3's apocalyptic setting seemed to be based on the winner of Splatoon 2's final Splatfest, "Chaos vs. Order", that being Team Chaos. Nintendo's promotion of Splatoon 3's "Grand Festival"—"Past vs. Present vs. Future"—in a similar fashion to previous games' final Splatfests gave way to fan speculation on whether its winner, Team Past, would influence a potential fourth mainline installment.

=== Salmon Run ===
Screenshot of an in-progress Salmon Run match in Splatoon 2, featuring the "Wave" and "Quota" indicators in the top left

"Salmon Run" is a co-op player versus environment gamemode introduced in Splatoon 2. Salmon Run tasks a team of four players with surviving hordes of hostile salmon enemies, named Salmonids, while collecting Golden Eggs and depositing them to meet a designated quota. Golden Eggs are obtained by splatting large Boss Salmonid enemies that periodically spawn. Ordinarily, there are three waves whose Golden Egg quotas must be met to complete a match, known as a "shift". If a player is splatted by a Salmonid, their teammates can revive them.

The incarnation of Salmon Run featured in Splatoon 3, titled "Salmon Run Next Wave", introduces a new enemy class called King Salmonids, which appear solely during a rare fourth wave. Two other additions exclusive to Splatoon 3 are the "Big Run" and "Eggstra Work" events, both of which occur every few months. During Big Runs, players fight against Salmonids on altered versions of usual multiplayer stages, while Eggstra Work features a predetermined shift that ends after five waves. Unlike in Splatoon 2, where Salmon Run could only be accessed at particular times of the day, Salmon Run Next Wave is always available to players.

=== Single-player mode ===
Each mainline Splatoon installment features a dedicated story mode available only in single-player. These campaigns borrow core gameplay elements from their parent titles, and generally have the player traverse a variety of 3D platforming challenges and fight bosses, with levels strewn about an overworld. Each campaign features hidden collectibles known as Sunken Scrolls, in-universe documents that provide narrative background on the Splatoon series' setting and characters. In Splatoon and Splatoon 2, they are found mostly in the levels themselves, while in Splatoon 3 they are located solely in the overworld. Additionally, Splatoon 2 and 3 feature downloadable content (DLC) expansion packs that are wholly single-player experiences, with Splatoon 3's expansion Side Order employing roguelike mechanics.

== Setting ==
Six Inklings (including one in swim form at bottom) and two Octolings (bottom left) wielding various types of in-game weapons, as seen in promotional artwork for Splatoon 3

The Splatoon games take place in an alternate, post-apocalyptic Earth set approximately 12,000 years into the future following the eradication of the human race and nearly all other mammal life, suggested to be due to rampant climate change. Following this mass-extinction event, much of Earth's marine animals rapidly evolved to survive on land, becoming largely terrestrial creatures. This includes the humanoid Inklings and Octolings, evolved squids and octopuses respectively, which in the present day populate the regions of Inkadia and the Splatlands.

Approximately one century before the events of the first Splatoon, during the "Mollusc Era", a worldwide flooding event strikes civilization in Inkadia. The dominant species of Inklings and Octarians, the overarching group of evolved octopuses of which Octolings are a part, become embroiled in a year-long conflict known as the "Great Turf War". Concluding with an overall Inkling victory, the Octarians are pushed into the underground domes once occupied by humans, while the Inklings reclaim the land on the surface, founding the city of Inkopolis. Meanwhile, DJ Octavio, commander of the Octarian forces, vows revenge against the Inkling race. He twice plots and temporarily succeeds to steal Inkopolis' primary power source, the Great Zapfish; this plotline is the general focus of the first two games' single-player campaigns. While his attempts are consistently foiled, later entries see former Octoling soldiers assimilate into Inkling society.

=== Fictional language ===
The Inklings employ a written and spoken fictional language made specially for the games. Several alphabets belonging to this language can be found scattered throughout in-game locations and clothing. While some textual elements resemble real-world languages, the dialect itself is linguistically inconsistent, and its glyphs are treated more often as diegetic design elements, unintended to be fully deciphered. The Octolings also speak in a distinct language separate from the Inklings'. Virtually all of Splatoon's in-game vocal music is sung in this fictional language; according to series producer Hisashi Nogami, this was done to increase the songs' worldwide appeal and to emphasize their rhythm and uniqueness.

=== Music ===
The music of Splatoon is primarily composed by Toru Minegishi, Shiho Fujii, and Ryo Nagamatsu. (Note: Nagamatsu left Nintendo in 2023.) Splatoon's songs are, like the Inkling language, largely diegetic. The game's idol groups, the Squid Sisters, Off The Hook, and Deep Cut, are fictional popstars which create and perform some of the songs as heard within the games. Other music heard in the game's singleplayer and multiplayer modes and certain idle areas are composed by separate in-universe musicians. In an 'Ask the Developers' feature from Nintendo, series creator Hisashi Nogami, Minegishi, and graphic artist Seita Inoue explained the decision to establish the music of Splatoon as being created by in-universe artists as a way to add to the depth of the game's world and depict the passage of time between each game. In the interview, Inoue described that "...the music can account for not only bands existing in this world, but also things like their history, the relationship between their members and how their approaches to life changed over time, it would add depth to the Inkling world."

== Games ==
Release timeline Main entries in bold
2015	**Splatoon**
2016
2017	**Splatoon 2**
2018	Splatoon 2: Octo Expansion
2019
2020
2021
2022	**Splatoon 3**
2023
2024	Splatoon 3: Side Order
2025
2026	Splatoon Raiders

=== Main installments ===
==== Splatoon (2015) ====
Splatoon is a 2015 third-person shooter video game developed and released for the Wii U. The title was revealed at Nintendo's E3 2014 digital presentation, with a playable demo available at the in-person showroom. It introduces the Inklings and handful of weapon classes and gamemodes, including Turf War and Ranked Battles. Splatoon features a single-player story campaign titled "Octo Valley" that has players combat Octarian forces and uncover the underlying narrative of Splatoon's world.

Octo Valley follows Agent 3, the newest member of the New Squidbeak Splatoon headed by Cap'n Cuttlefish, the now-elderly general of the Inkling military at the time of the Great Turf War. Upon learning of the surreptitious disappearance of Inkopolis' Great Zapfish, he deduces that the Octarians, more specifically his wartime arch-rival DJ Octavio, is behind the plot as revenge against the Inklings. He tasks Agent 3 with invading Octarian territory, aided occasionally by past recruits Agents 1 and 2, with the intent of reaching Octavio.

==== Splatoon 2 (2017) ====
Splatoon 2 is a 2017 third-person shooter game developed for the Nintendo Switch and released on 21 July. It was formally unveiled in the reveal trailer for the Switch on 13 January 2017. Adding new maps and weapons, Splatoon 2 includes a direct successor to Splatoon's single-player campaign, now titled "Octo Canyon".

Octo Canyon opens with Marie of the Squid Sisters idol group informing the player that Cuttlefish, Agent 3, and the Great Zapfish have gone missing; she is especially concerned about the contemporaneous disappearance of her cousin and co-star Callie. She presumes that Octavio is behind the Zapfish's and Callie's vanishing, as he has since escaped his imprisonment in a larger-than-life snow globe following his defeat in Splatoon. In lieu of Cuttlefish, Marie recruits the player as Agent 4 and once again has them intercept Octarian forces with the goal of finding Octavio, Callie, and the Zapfish.

==== Splatoon 3 (2022) ====
Splatoon 3 is a 2022 third-person shooter video game released for the Nintendo Switch on 9 September. Its teaser trailer was unveiled at the end of a Nintendo Direct presentation on 17 February 2021, featuring a new apocalyptic setting, weapons, and stages. Splatoon 3 features an expanded single-player mode titled "Return of the Mammalians", which was first shown off in a dedicated trailer released in September of that year.

Return of the Mammalians initially follows a now-retired Cuttlefish who recruits the player character as the new Agent 3, the latter of whom is accompanied by a miniature Salmonid named Smallfry. The party seeks to investigate the thrice stealing of the Great Zapfish, which Cuttlefish assumes Octavio is once again behind. They reach Octavio in a crater neighboring the city of Splatsville and defeat him; however, he denies responsibility for taking the Zapfish. The four are then pulled beneath the crater by a mass of Fuzzy Ooze.

Agent 3 and Smallfry awaken in a new area named Alterna, a massive domed settlement dating to the human era. There they meet Callie, Marie, and the original Agent 3, who has since been promoted to Captain of the New Squidbeak Splatoon. Heeding a distress call from Cuttlefish, the group explore Alterna with the goal of retrieving him. They are continuously intercepted by Shiver, Frye, and Big Man, bandits-turned-idols of the Splatsville-based group Deep Cut.

=== Expansion packs ===
==== Splatoon 2: Octo Expansion (2018) ====
Splatoon 2: Octo Expansion is a 2018 downloadable content (DLC) expansion pack for Splatoon 2.

Following an amnesiac Octoling given the moniker Agent 8, Octo Expansion has players complete a maximum of eighty testing trials scattered throughout a subterranean subway station managed by a corporation named Kamabo Co. Agent 8's ultimate goal is to ascend to the surface by collecting four objects known as "thangs" at the direction of a talking telephone.

==== Splatoon 3: Side Order (2024) ====
Splatoon 3: Side Order is a 2024 DLC single-player expansion to Splatoon 3, released as part of the paid Splatoon 3 Expansion Pass on 22 February. Side Order utilizes a roguelike style designed to be replayable, having players unlock gameplay-enhancing perks known as "color chips", attached to loadouts called "palettes", as they ascend a thirty-floor spire.

Side Order follows several characters previously featured in Octo Expansion, including Pearl, Marina, and Agent 8, the lattermost of whom the player once again assumes control. It is set in the featureless "Memverse", a virtual reality concocted by Marina. Agent 8 is tasked with traveling up the thirty-floor tower to defeat Order, a rogue artificial intelligence who pulled numerous unwilling souls from the outside into the Memverse as part of its plot to instigate a sterile world of pure orderliness.

=== Spin-off ===
==== Splatoon Raiders (2026) ====
Splatoon Raiders was unveiled by Nintendo on 10 June 2025 as an exclusive for the Nintendo Switch 2, and was released on 23 July 2026. The first spin-off game in the series, Raiders follows Deep Cut and an unnamed mechanic as they explore the Spirhalite Islands region.

== Development ==
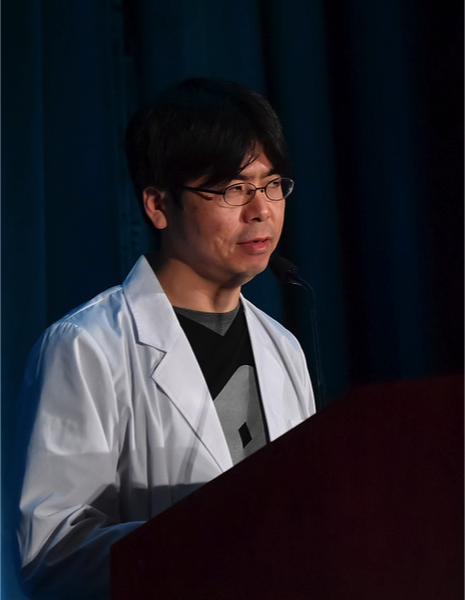
Series producer Hisashi Nogami in 2018

Splatoon was developed for the Wii U by Nintendo Entertainment Analysis & Development (EAD) with later assistance from Monolith Soft, who would contribute to all future installments. Its earliest conceptual stage, formulated in 2013, originally consisted of a four-versus-four ink-based territory control game set in a featureless arena. This version of the game was headed by Shintaro Sato and Hisashi Nogami, both of whom previously worked on Nintendo's Animal Crossing series. The prototype was expanded to include map verticality and the mechanic of hiding in ink, but the team had difficulty trying to "filter it down" to being simple and fun, finding the experience unfocused. At this point, Shigeru Miyamoto felt the game lacked appeal.

The game's art director created preliminary concept sketches of various player characters, including "macho men", robots, and Mario, the latter of which was included at Miyamoto's suggestion. Eventually, the team centered on anthropomorphic rabbits with the ability to burrow through virtually any solid surface so long as it was covered in ink. This was considered due to the game's area control-centric gameplay and the fact that rabbits are naturally territorial animals. While the team liked the idea, it was objected to by others around the company, who felt that there was a clash between the characters' appearances and the ink-based gameplay. After internal creative struggle, the designers settled on squid-like characters that could submerge in ink as a cephalopod, but also utilize a humanoid form for the purpose of holding weaponry. They were initially conceptualized as squid-human hybrids; this design was rejected out of worry such characters "wouldn't sell." They instead decided to have the squid characters, named Inklings, simply switch between a purely humanoid form and a purely cepholopodic form. This concept lent itself to more complex gameplay mechanics, such as the ability to swim through the player's own ink and sustain damage if treading through their opponent's, both of which Miyamoto approved of. The Wii U GamePad was utilized as a means for players to track their team's progress via a real-time overhead view of the current battle.

In 2014, Splatoon was revealed during a Nintendo Direct video presentation at E3 2014, and a playable demo version featuring four-versus-four local Turf War matches was made available on the show floor. By this point, only 10% of the full game had been completed. Subsequently, a time-limited multiplayer demo, the "Global Testfire", was made available for download from 8 to 9 May 2015. The full game was released globally between 28 and 30 May 2015.

Work on a sequel, titled Splatoon 2, began around October 2015. It was developed by Nintendo Entertainment Planning & Development, following the 2015 merger of Nintendo EAD and Nintendo Software Planning & Development (SPD). It was announced for the Nintendo Switch in January 2017. Its formal unveiling came following its soft-reveal in numerous clips in the console's initial announcement trailer, where it was promoted akin to an esport. The full game was subsequently released on 21 July 2017. Splatoon 2 features a redesigned user interface due to the lack of the Wii U GamePad's touch screen, and includes new maps, weapons and abilities. SplatNet 2, a service contained within the Nintendo Switch Online mobile app was released which allows players to view their in-game statistics, earn digital wallpapers by completing challenges, and communicate with other players through voice chat. The Octo Expansion DLC was made available globally on 13 June 2018. On 22 April 2022, Octo Expansion was added as a benefit to members of the Switch Online Expansion Pass.

Splatoon 3 was announced in a Nintendo Direct on 17 February 2021. It was released on 9 September 2022, being developed by Nintendo Entertainment Planning & Development. The game features an apocalyptic setting based on the winner of Splatoon 2's "Chaos vs. Order" Splatfest; the developers had, in advance, planned for either outcome before the results were announced. The sequel adds new maps, weapons, abilities, and movement options, along with a new mode based on card games, known as "Tableturf Battle". An early-access demo titled "Splatoon 3: Splatfest World Premiere" was held on 27 August 2022. In addition, the Nintendo Switch Online app includes SplatNet 3, with in-game statistics, voice chat, and other features. In the 14 September 2023 Nintendo Direct, the paid DLC Splatoon 3: Side Order was announced, featuring a new single-player campaign, which was released on 22 February 2024.

An official soundtrack, Splatune, was released by Enterbrain in Japan on 21 October 2015. The soundtrack to the sequel, Splatune 2, and another for the Octo Expansion, Octotune, released on 29 November 2017 and 18 July 2018 respectively. The soundtrack for the third installment, Splatune 3, and another for Side Order, Ordertune, were released on 26 April 2023 and 11 December 2024 respectively.

== Reception ==
Sales and aggregate review scores As of 30 September 2026.
Game	Year	Units sold (in millions)	Metacritic
Splatoon	2015	4.95	81
Splatoon 2	2017	13.60	83
Splatoon 2: Octo Expansion	2018	—	82
Splatoon 3	2022	11.96	83
Splatoon 3: Side Order	2024	—	78
Splatoon Raiders	2026	2.42	82

Games in the Splatoon series have been generally well-received, and its unique gameplay has been credited as a successful reinvention of the third-person shooter genre. Giovanni Colantonio of Digital Trends lauded the signature Turf War mode as a "genius concept", with its simplicity allowing all players, regardless of skill level, to meaningfully contribute to victory. The franchise's colorful presentation and cartoony characters, in contrast to contemporary shooters' focus on realistic graphics, have been highly praised by reviewers. Jordan Biordi of CG Magazine critiqued the series' predetermined loadout system for weapons as restrictive for player freedom. Additionally, a lack of built-in voice chat functionality, with later entries restricting said voice chat to the Nintendo Switch Online mobile app, has been met with criticism. The series' online matchmaking has seen a generally mixed reception. Brendan Graeber of IGN praised later games' quality-of-life improvements such as the inclusion of a physical training room in the online lobby of Splatoon 3, as opposed to earlier titles' static matchmaking screens. However, other critics have lamented a prevalence of network disconnections and unbalanced skill pairings between teams during battles.

The soundtrack of Splatoon has been acclaimed by critics. Ben Johnson of Pocket Tactics praised the music as "genre fusion to the max, in the strangest way possible." Johnson further commended the series' incorporation of the soundtrack with the game's universe as a whole, saying "The games are set in dense cities, with a hyper fixation on fashion and music... As the world itself is so focused on music, it can't be mere background noise."

The aesthetic design of the Inklings has received a positive critical reception from multiple video game publications following the release of the first Splatoon, and have since become a popular subject for cosplay activities. The integration of the Inklings' physiological characteristics into the gameplay mechanics of the Splatoon series have been praised, as it allowed players to explore a unique tactical concept. Polygon staff in particular ranked two notable Inkling characters, the "Squid Sisters" idols Callie and Marie, among the 70 best video game characters of the 2010s decade, describing them as "pop sensations". A seemingly-intentional decision to remove gendered language from player character customization in Splatoon 3's English localization was praised by Ana Diaz of Polygon.

Josh Broadwell of NPR reported on how Splatoon differed from games like it in its genre and has created a more welcoming community than other shooters, due to the flexibility of its gameplay, Nintendo's approach to player communication, and the series' casual nature. The more welcoming behavior of Splatoon's playerbase, a sizeable portion of which consist of LGBTQ+ people, was analyzed in Xtra Magazine, where Jade King suggested the large queer community of Splatoon was largely a result of the series' emphasis on individuality, rebellion, self-expression and style, and the lack of gender-restricted styles and customization; the omission of built-in voice chat was noted as having created a more accepting environment.

Due to the polarizing nature of the choices offered during Splatfests, the themes themselves tend to be the subject of media attention. Professor Derek Foster noted in an article on the tendency of some Splatoon players to choose one team over another based on which idol was backing said team, rather than the question being asked. He commented that, at the time of writing in 2023, fans of Frye of Deep Cut had exhibited aggression towards those of her co-star Shiver online after the latter held a prolonged Splatfest winstreak in Splatoon 3, with some further accusing Nintendo of deliberate favoritism. In the prelude to the "Spicy vs. Sweet vs. Sour" Splatfest, in which Team Sweet was supported by Frye, fans rallied support for her in acknowledgement of her past unluckiness; her ultimate victory was met with warm reception among players.

=== Sales ===
By September 2022, the first Splatoon sold approximately 4.95 million copies, while its sequel amassed around 13.60 million sales. Splatoon 3 attracted media attention when it became the fastest-selling game of all time in Japan from September to November 2022 when it was surpassed by Pokémon Scarlet and Violet; Splatoon 3 amassed 3.45 million copies three days after release. By 2024, the title had sold 11.96 million copies, making for an all-time series sales figure of about 30 million.

== In other media ==
Characters from Splatoon, particularly the Inklings, have appeared in other games created by Nintendo, such as Super Mario Maker, Mario Kart 8 Deluxe, and Super Smash Bros. Ultimate. A crossover event between Splatoon 2 and Animal Crossing: Pocket Camp occurred in September 2018. In July 2019, a Splatoon 2 theme was made available in Tetris 99 to commemorate Splatoon 2's "Final Fest" Splatfest on 18 July 2019. On 16 January 2026, the 3.0 update for Animal Crossing: New Horizons, which adds various furniture items and two islanders based on Splatoon that are accessible via Amiibo, was released.

The NES Zapper, which appears as a usable weapon, became a popular collectible item following its inclusion. Water guns modeled after the weapons that appear in the games have additionally been sold as toys.

=== Esports ===
Due to the availability of competitive game modes in Splatoon, competitive esports tournaments with sponsored prizing have been held as early as 2016 in Japan.

With the release of Splatoon 2, Nintendo established the Splatoon 2 World Championships and began hosting competitive tournaments in 2018. Teams of four compete in a series of online qualifiers or live tournaments to earn invitations to play at the World Championships, which are played at the Nintendo World Championships alongside other Nintendo games such as Super Smash Bros. Ultimate. The event was typically held during Nintendo's E3 events and livestreamed.

=== Print media ===
Between January 2016 and March 2017, two webcomic series based on Splatoon appeared in Enterbrain's Weekly Famitsu magazine: Honobono Ika 4koma illustrated by Kino Takahashi, and Play Manga by various doujin writers. The comics were published by Kadokawa Future Publishing on 15 June 2017.

A Splatoon manga series illustrated by Sankichi Hinodeya began serialization in Shogakukan's CoroCoro Comic magazine in February 2016, following a one-shot published in CoroCoro in May 2015. The licensing rights to publish the manga in North America was later acquired by Viz Media in 2017. In July 2017, a motion comic adaptation of the manga was announced and then released on CoroCoro's YouTube channel the following month. As of February 2018, the manga has over 800,000 copies in print and the series is currently ongoing.

In April 2017, a manga series illustrated by Hideki Goto titled Splatoon: Squid Kids Comedy Show was published in Bessatsu CoroCoro Comic. It was also later acquired by Viz Media, who translated and published the series in North America.

=== Concerts ===
A series of real-life virtual concerts featuring holograms of the game's protagonists have been held at various locations, primarily in Japan.

In 2016, a concert tour known as "Squid Sisters Live" was held commemorating the sale of 1 million copies of Splatoon. The concerts have taken place at Niconico Tokaigi, Chokaigi and Niconico Cho Party in Japan, and the Japan Expo in Paris. Similarly, concert tours featuring Splatoon 2's Off the Hook was held months after the game's release since 2018. Recordings from the concerts have been made into albums. Concerts of Splatoon 3's Deep Cut have also been held.
