= Ace Angler =

2019 video game

- Developer: Bandai Namco Entertainment
- Publisher: Bandai Namco Entertainment
- Platform: Nintendo Switch
- Release: JP: July 25, 2019; SEA: July 21, 2020
- Genre: Fishing
- Modes: Single-player, multiplayer

Ace Angler: Nintendo Switch Version (or simply Ace Angler), released in Japan as Fishing Spirits: Nintendo Switch Version, (Note: Alternatively, Tsuri Spirits: Nintendo Switch Version) is a 2019 fishing video game published by Bandai Namco Entertainment. The game was released for the Nintendo Switch.

== Development and release ==
Ace Angler is based on Fishing Spirits, a fishing simulator arcade game. In the arcade game, players use their rod controllers to catch the fish swimming on the monitor. A trailer for Ace Angler was released in May 2019.

The arcade game was ported to the Nintendo Switch and released in Japan under the title Fishing Spirits: Nintendo Switch Version on July 25, 2019. It was later released in Southeast Asia on July 21, 2020, as Ace Angler: Nintendo Switch Version. Though release for Western markets never occurred, copyrights for the game's title surfaced in various countries in 2022 (its sequel would be released outside Asia).

== Reception ==
Ace Angler sold over 800,000 copies.

== Sequel ==
Ace Angler: Fishing Spirits, a sequel to the game, was announced in 2022. It was released in Japan on October 27, 2022 and North America on October 28, 2022.
