= Honō no Tōkyūji: Dodge Danpei =

Japanese manga series

- First tankōbon volume cover, featuring Danpei Ichigeki

炎の闘球児 ドッジ弾平
- Genre: Action, comedy, sports
- Manga
- Written by: Tetsuhiro Koshita
- Published by: Shogakukan
- Magazine: CoroCoro Comic
- Original run: 1989 – 1995
- Volumes: 18
- Anime television series
- Directed by: Hiroshi Sasagawa
- Written by: Takashi Yamada
- Music by: Ryuichi Katsumata
- Studio: Animation 21
- Original network: TXN (TV Tokyo)
- Original run: October 14, 1991 – September 21, 1992
- Episodes: 47
- Manga

Honō no Tōkyūjo: Dodge Danko
- Written by: Tetsuhiro Koshita
- Published by: Shogakukan
- Magazine: Weekly CoroCoro Comic
- Original run: November 28, 2022 – present
- Volumes: 9
- Anime television series

Honō no Tōkyūjo: Dodge Danko
- Directed by: Hiroshi Ikehata
- Written by: Kazuho Hyōdō
- Music by: Yasunori Iwasaki; Ren Tsukagoshi
- Studio: Cue
- Licensed by: SEA: Plus Media Networks Asia
- Original network: Tokyo MX, MBS, BS11, MTV
- Original run: July 6, 2026 – September 21, 2026
- Episodes: 12

Honō no Tōkyūji: Dodge Danpei (炎の闘球児 ドッジ弾平; 'Flaming Rugby Boy: Dodge Danpei') is a Japanese manga series about dodgeball written and illustrated by Tetsuhiro Koshita, which was serialized in Shogakukan's CoroCoro Comic magazine from 1989 to 1995. An anime television series produced by Animation 21 aired from October 1991 to September 1992, along with eight video game adaptations.

A sequel series, titled Honō no Tōkyūjo: Dodge Danko, began serialization on the Weekly CoroCoro Comic website on November 28, 2022. It was nominated for the Next Manga Award in the web manga category in 2023. An anime television series adaptation of the sequel produced by Cue aired from July to September 2026.

== Plot ==
Danpei Ichigeki loves dodgeball and is excited to join the dodgeball club when he enters elementary school. On the morning of the entrance ceremony, Danpei visits the grave of his father, Danjūrō, who was a famous dodgeball player, and knocks over his gravestone with a hard throw. Inside, he finds a ball, which he assumes is a gift; he eventually joins the dodgeball club after passing the difficult entrance exam.

== Characters ==
=== Tamagawa Dodge Club ===
Danpei Ichigeki (一撃 弾平)
Voiced by: Noriko Hidaka
Chin'nen Kobotoke (小仏 珍念)
Voiced by: Masako Nozawa
Misato Tōdō (藤堂 みさと)
Voiced by: Satoko Kitō
Tsutomu Miura (三浦 つとむ)
Voiced by: Kappei Yamaguchi/Akiko Suzuki

==== Year 1 ====
Taisei Mikasa (三笠 大成)
Voiced by: Kiyoyuki Yanada
Takashi Hiura (火浦 高志)
Voiced by: Shin'ichirō Miki
Masaru Kazami (風見 勝)
Voiced by: Jun'ichi Kanemaru
Manabu Hayami (速水 学)
Voiced by: Kyōsei Tsukui
Masaru Hijikata (土方 大)
Voiced by: Hidenari Ugaki

==== Year 4 ====
Osamu Ozaki (尾崎 治)
Voiced by: Toshiharu Sakurai
Tsuyoshi Kinoshita (木下 つよし)
Voiced by: Shin'ichirō Miki
Yūichi Takeda (武田 勇一)
Voiced by: Kiyoyuki Yanada
Yūji Takeda (武田 勇二)
Voiced by: Jun'ichi Kanemaru
Kōji Sakamaki (逆巻 浩司)

==== Year 5 ====
Jirō Murakami (村上 ジロー)
Sawamura (沢村)

=== Danpei's Family ===
Haruka Ichigeki (一撃 遙)
Voiced by: Rumiko Ukai
Danjūrō Ichigeki (一撃 弾十郎)
Voiced by: Tesshō Genda
Mr. Tama (タマ公, Tama-kō)
Voiced by: Ayako Shiraishi
Father Ikkyū (一球和尚, Ikkyū-oshō)
Voiced by: Kaneta Kimotsuki

=== Tamagawa Elementary ===
Principal Kuga (久我校長, Kuga-kōchō)
Voiced by: Toshiya Ueda
Tōdō (藤堂)
Voiced by: Toshiharu Sakurai
Tatsuya Kuroiwa (黒岩 竜也)
Voiced by: Chika Sakamoto
Tatsuya's Father
Voiced by: Mitsuaki Hoshino
Kanō (叶)

=== St. Arrows Institute ===
Taiga Nikaidō (二階堂 大河)
Voiced by: Toshihiko Seki
Gō Igarashi (五十嵐 剛)
Voiced by: Hideyuki Umezu
Kazuhiko Higashiyama (東山 一彦)
Ryō Sakakibara (榊原 良)
Shun Kusunoki (楠木 俊)
Makoto Kobayakawa (小早川 誠)
Futoshi Mitamura (三田村 太)

=== Tosa Attackers ===
Ryūta Sakamoto (坂本 龍太)
Voiced by: Kenshi Tobiyama
Gorō Katsuragi (桂木 五郎)
Keiji Harima (播磨 啓次)
Kaoru Shisoma (四十間 薫)
Ryūnoshin Sakamoto (坂本 龍之進)
Voiced by: Hiroshi Ito

=== Black Armors ===
Arashi Midō (御堂 嵐)
Voiced by: Shigeru Nakahara
Jun Takayama (高山 準)
Voiced by: Hidenari Ugaki
Shun Usami (宇佐美 俊)
Voiced by: Masami Kikuchi
Ryūnosuke Fuwa (不破 龍之介)
Kenji Ogata (緒方 健治)
Kazuki Hattori (服部 一樹)
Takeshi Yūki (結城 猛)
Mamoru Kunidera (国寺 護)

=== Arasaki Elementary ===
Tōma Rikuō (陸王 冬馬)
Voiced by: Jun Nakahara
Akira Shirakawa (白川 晶)
Voiced by: Wataru Takagi
Ken Sakamaki (逆巻 拳)
Gō Sakamaki (逆巻 豪)
Shōji Taki (滝 省治)
Takumi Misawa (三沢 巧)
Yukio Tsunoda (角田 行男)

=== Kazama Elementary ===
Kōji Sakamaki (逆巻 浩司)
Godai (五大)

=== Genbu Elementary ===
Hyō Sakaki (賢木 豹)
Kumamaru Sakaki (賢木 熊丸)

=== Honō no Tōkyūjo: Dodge Danko ===
Danko Ichigeki (一撃 弾子)
Voiced by: Manaka Nakayama
The daughter of Danpei Ichigeki. Possessing the same hotblooded attitude as her father, Danko strives to carry on his legacy and continue playing Super Dodgeball with the next generation of the Tamagawa Dodge Club. Her style is as straightforward as her father's, relying on powerful throws and impacts. She takes her training very seriously and always gives 100% effort.
Chinko Kobotoke (小仏 珍子)
Voiced by: Kaori Maeda
Mochiko Etai (江袋 もち子)
Voiced by: Akira Sekine
Susan Canon (スーザン・キャノン)
Voiced by: Yō Taichi
Honey Otohana (音花 羽仁衣)
Voiced by: Yū Sasahara
Danpei Ichigeki (adult) (一撃 弾平)
Voiced by: Katsuyuki Konishi
Chin'nen Kobotoke (adult) (小仏 珍念)
Voiced by: Tetsu Inada
Peiko Nikaidō (二階堂 平子)
Voiced by: Yuki Wakai
The daughter of Taiga Nikaidō and the leader of St. Arrows in the current generation. Wanting to keep up the spirit of competition between her father and Danpei, Peiko declares Danko her eternal rival in dodgeball and aims to make sure she is always focused on her dodgeball duties. A lot of her actions come off as obsessive, and when it comes to facing Danko on the court, she shows a highly masochistic side. Nevertheless, she is a very fierce competitor.
Hako Mikasa (三笠 はこ)
Voiced by: Sumire Uesaka
Hayami Hiura (火浦 颯美)
Voiced by: Kanna Nakamura
Juri Igarashi (五十嵐 柔里)
Voiced by: Yuka Iguchi
Ruka Sakamoto (坂本 龍華)
Voiced by: Satomi Akesaka
Zoe (ゾーイ)
Voiced by: Fairouz Ai
Ran Midou (御堂 蘭)
Voiced by: Mariya Ise

== Media ==
=== Anime ===
An anime television series adaptation of Honō no Tōkyūji: Dodge Danpei, produced by Animation 21 and directed by Hiroshi Sasagawa, aired for 47 episodes from October 14, 1991, to September 21, 1992, on TV Tokyo and its affiliates.

An anime television series adaptation of the sequel Honō no Tōkyūjo: Dodge Danko was announced on July 11, 2025. It is produced by Cue and directed by Hiroshi Ikehata, with Kazuho Hyōdō handling series composition, Narihito Sekikawa designing the characters and serving as the chief animation director, and Yasunori Iwasaki and Ren Tsukagoshi composing the music. The series aired from July 6 to September 21, 2026, on Tokyo MX and other networks. The opening theme song is "Kaishin no Ichigeki" (会心の一劇; A Masterful Play) performed by Momoiro Clover Z, while the ending theme song is "Welcome to Azatosa World" (Welcome to あざとさワールド), performed by Iris.

==== Episodes ====
===== Honō no Tōkyūji: Dodge Danpei =====
No.	Title	Directed by	Written by	Storyboarded by	Original release date
1	Transliteration: "Tanjō! Honō no Tōkyūji" (Japanese: 誕生! 炎の闘球児)	Yutaka Kagawa	Kōichi Mizuide	Yutaka Kagawa	October 14, 1991
2	Transliteration: "Kyōfu no Senkyū Dojji" (Japanese: 恐怖の千球ドッジ)	Yutaka Kagawa	Kōichi Mizuide	Yutaka Kagawa	October 21, 1991
3	Transliteration: "Enjōzan no Mō Tokkun" (Japanese: 炎上山の猛特訓)	Toshi Shishikura	Takashi Yamada	Toshi Shishikura	October 28, 1991
4	Transliteration: "Datō! Tama-Shō Shiten'nō" (Japanese: 打倒! 球小四天王)	Seitarō Hara	Takashi Yamada	Seitarō Hara	November 4, 1991
5	Transliteration: "Mieta zo Honō no Māku! Taose Nazo no Tōkyūji!!" (Japanese: 見えたぞ炎のマーク! 倒せ謎の闘球児!!)	Akinori Ōrai	Kōichi Mizuide	Akinori Ōrai	November 11, 1991
6	Transliteration: "Kyōfu no Tōkyū Dōmu Yaru ze Tekkyū Dojji" (Japanese: 恐怖の闘球ドーム やるぜ鉄球ドッジ)	Takeshi Ashizawa	Kōichi Mizuide	Takaaki Ishiyama	November 18, 1991
7	Transliteration: "Danpei o Koeru! Chin'nen: Honō no Heikindai Shōbu" (Japanese: 弾平を超える! 珍念・炎の平均台勝負)	Shinji Takagi	Mihoko Inoue	Yoshizo Tsuda	November 25, 1991
8	Transliteration: "Kowakunai ze! Nana Mētoru e no Charenji" (Japanese: 怖くないぜ! 7メートルへのチャレンジ)	Toshi Shishikura	Mihoko Inoue	Toshi Shishikura	December 2, 1991
9	Transliteration: "Regyurā o Tsukame! Kizutsuita Yubi no Gōsokkyū" (Japanese: レギュラーをつかめ! 傷ついた指の豪速球)	Seitarō Hara	Takashi Yamada	Seitarō Hara	December 9, 1991
10	Transliteration: "Iku zo Taiga! Shōri o Yobu ka Danpei Hatsu Kessen" (Japanese: いくぞ大河! 勝利をよぶか弾平初決戦)	Yoshiaki Iwasaki	Kōichi Mizuide	Shinji Takagi	December 16, 1991

===== Honō no Tōkyūjo: Dodge Danko =====
No.	Title (Note: All English titles are taken from Aniplus Asia.)	Directed by (Note: Production staff information is taken from the ending credits of each episode.)	Written by	Storyboarded by	Original release date
1	Transliteration: "Honō no Tōkyūjo! Danko Ichigeki!" (Japanese: 炎の闘球女！一撃弾子！)	Kanta Shiba	Kazuho Hyōdō	Hiroshi Ikehata	July 6, 2026
2	Transliteration: "Sassō Hatsujō! In'nen no Raibaru!" (Japanese: 颯爽発場！因縁のライバル！)	Madoka Yaguchi	Kazuho Hyōdō	Hiroshi Ikehata	July 13, 2026
3	Transliteration: "Gekitotsu! Haran Hisshi no Shiai Kaishi!" (Japanese: 激突！波乱必至の試合開始！)	Toshiyuki Sone	Kazuho Hyōdō	Takayuki Inagaki	July 20, 2026
4	Transliteration: "Ame no Naka no Kessen! Danko, Kakusei!" (Japanese: 雨の中の決戦！弾子、覚醒！)	Kō Horio	Kazuho Hyōdō	Kō Horio	July 27, 2026
5	Transliteration: "In'nen no Kecchaku! Susume Tamagawa Tōkyū Bu!" (Japanese: 因縁の決着！進め球川闘球部！)	Mio Nishimura, Yurina Utsugi	Kazuho Hyōdō	Takayuki Inagaki	August 3, 2026
6	Transliteration: "Arata na Kyōteki!? Gōdō Tokkun!" (Japanese: 新たな強敵！？合同特訓！)	Kanta Shiba	Kazuho Hyōdō	Hiroaki Shimura	August 10, 2026
7	Transliteration: "Kaimaku! Ura Chō Tōkyū Taikai!" (Japanese: 開幕！裏超闘球大会！)	Yoshitsugu Kimura	Kazuho Hyōdō	Hiroshi Ikehata	August 17, 2026
8	Transliteration: "Chōjō Taiketsu! Kyojin tai Kyojin!" (Japanese: 超常対決！巨人vs巨人！)	Madoka Yaguchi	Kazuho Hyōdō	Susumu Nishizawa	August 24, 2026
9	Transliteration: "Senritsu no Kioku! Shura no Dojji!" (Japanese: 戦慄の記憶！修羅のドッジ！)	Naoki Yamamoto	Kazuho Hyōdō	Hiroaki Shimura	August 31, 2026
10	Transliteration: "Ikinokore! Denjarasu Taimu!" (Japanese: 生き残れ！デンジャラス・タイム！)	Hideaki Ōba	Kazuho Hyōdō	Keiichirō Kawaguchi	September 7, 2026
11	Transliteration: "Yami wo Nagiharae! Densetsu no Shūto!" (Japanese: 闇をなぎ払え！伝説のシュート！)	Akira Katō	Kazuho Hyōdō	Yukihiro Matsushita	September 14, 2026
12	Transliteration: "Honō no Kecchaku! Saishū Kessen!" (Japanese: 炎の決着！最終決戦！)	Hiroshi Ikehata	Kazuho Hyōdō	Hiroshi Ikehata	September 21, 2026

=== Video games ===
- Honō no Tōkyūji: Dodge Danpei (March 28, 1992, Famicom, published by Sunsoft)
- Honō no Tōkyūji: Dodge Danpei (April 24, 1992, Game Boy, published by Hudson Soft)
- Honō no Tōkyūji: Dodge Danpei (July 10, 1992, Mega Drive, published by Sega)
- Honō no Tōkyūji: Dodge Danpei (July 31, 1992, Super Famicom, published by Sunsoft)
- Honō no Tōkyūji: Dodge Danpei (August 7, 1992, Game Gear, developed by Sims, published by Sega)
- Honō no Tōkyūji: Dodge Danpei (September 25, 1992, PC Engine, developed by AIM, published by Hudson Soft)
- Honō no Tōkyūji: Dodge Danpei 2 (March 26, 1993, Famicom, published by Sunsoft)
- Pigu-Wang Tongki M (피구왕통키M "Dodgeball King Tongki M") (September 6, 2018, Android/iOS, developed by Snowpipe)

== See also ==
- List of anime distributed by TV Tokyo
- Noriko Hidaka
- Tesshō Genda
