= Squid Girl =

Japanese manga series by Masahiro Anbe

- Volume 1 cover, featuring Squid Girl

侵略!イカ娘 (Shinryaku! Ika Musume)
- Genre: Comedy, slice of life
- Manga
- Written by: Masahiro Anbe
- Published by: Akita Shoten
- Magazine: Weekly Shōnen Champion
- Original run: July 26, 2007 – February 25, 2016
- Volumes: 22
- Anime television series
- Directed by: Tsutomu Mizushima
- Written by: Michiko Yokote
- Music by: Tomoki Kikuya
- Studio: Diomedéa
- Licensed by: AUS: Madman Entertainment; NA: Sentai Filmworks; UK: Manga Entertainment
- Original network: TV Tokyo
- English network: SEA: Animax Asia
- Original run: October 4, 2010 – December 20, 2010
- Episodes: 12
- Anime television series

Shinryaku!? Ika Musume
- Directed by: Tsutomu Mizushima (general director); Yasutaka Yamamoto (director)
- Written by: Michiko Yokote
- Music by: Tomoki Kikuya
- Studio: Diomedéa
- Licensed by: NA: Sentai Filmworks
- Original network: TV Tokyo, AT-X
- English network: SEA: Animax Asia
- Original run: September 26, 2011 – December 26, 2011
- Episodes: 12
- Original video animation

Shinryaku!! Ika Musume
- Directed by: Tsutomu Mizushima
- Written by: Michiko Yokote
- Music by: Tomoki Kikuya
- Studio: Diomedéa
- Licensed by: NA: Sentai Filmworks
- Released: August 8, 2012 – September 9, 2014
- Runtime: 24 minutes
- Episodes: 3
- icon

Squid Girl, known in Japan as Shinryaku! Ika Musume (侵略!イカ娘; lit. Invasion! Squid Girl) with the subtitle The invader comes from the bottom of the sea!, is a Japanese manga series by Masahiro Anbe, which was serialized in Akita Shoten's Weekly Shōnen Champion between July 2007 and February 2016. An anime television series adaptation produced by Diomedéa aired on TV Tokyo between October and December 2010, with a second season airing between September and December 2011. Three original video animation (OVA) episodes were released between 2012 and 2014.

== Premise ==
Vowing to take over the world as revenge for polluting the ocean, Squid Girl attempts to make her base of operations the Lemon Beach House (alt. Lemon Beach Shack), a small beachside restaurant run by the Aizawa siblings. However, when she accidentally breaks a hole in their wall trying to demonstrate her power by trying to swat a mosquito, she is forced to work as a waitress to pay off the damages. Thus, Squid Girl begins her life on the surface, learning new things and encountering many curious visitors.

== Characters ==
=== Main characters ===
Squid Girl (イカ娘, Ika Musume)
Voiced by: Hisako Kanemoto (Japanese); Christine Marie Cabanos (English)
Squid Girl appears as a young humanoid girl with blue cephalopod tentacles for hair. Her goal is to take over humanity as punishment for the pollution done to the sea. However, after causing damage to Lemon (which she planned to use as a base), she was forced to work as a waitress to pay for the damages. She possesses numerous squid abilities including extending her tentacles, regenerating severed ones, spewing squid ink from her mouth, glowing in the dark like the firefly squid, swimming and breathing underwater. She also has bracelets that enable her to have weight-shifting abilities.^{S2 Ep. 2c} It is later revealed that what appears as her white squid-shaped skullcap is actually part of her head, so fatal consequences might occur if someone was to attempt removing her "cap". The two fins on her "cap" can move like actual squid fins, although she was initially ignorant of the fact. Her favorite food is shrimp, and she greatly fears natural predators of squids like sharks and killer whales to the point that even swimming floats of such creatures terrify her. Although generally immature at first and often getting herself into mischief from the start, she is a fast learner, able to master complex things such as math and other languages in a short period of time.
Eiko Aizawa (相沢 栄子, Aizawa Eiko)
Voiced by: Ayumi Fujimura (Japanese); Heather Pennington (Season 1), Kira Vincent-Davis (Season 2, OVAs) (English)
A 17-year-old high school student and the co-manager^{S1 episode preview} of the Lemon Beach House with short red hair who lives with her siblings Chizuru and Takeru. She is a strong-minded girl and constantly has to keep Squid Girl in check. Despite her frequent irritation towards Squid Girl, Eiko does seem to care for her more than she is willing to admit and the two eventually become good friends. When not minding the shop, she enjoys playing video games, but studying is a weak point for her. As a tomboy, she loathes wearing girly clothes and even skirts.
Chizuru Aizawa (相沢 千鶴, Aizawa Chizuru)
Voiced by: Rie Tanaka (Japanese); Shelby Lindley (Season 1), Luci Christian (Season 2, OVAs) (English)
Eiko's older sister and manager who has long blue hair and narrowed eyes; she is the main cook at Lemon. She has the appearance of a kind person, but every so often, she exhibits extraordinary abilities and a fearsome aura which she will direct at anyone looking to cause trouble to Lemon or threaten her family and friends.
Takeru Aizawa (相沢 たける, Aizawa Takeru)
Voiced by: Miki Ōtani (Japanese); Amanda C. Miller (Season 1), Greg Ayres (Season 2, OVAs) (English)
Eiko and Chizuru's younger brother. Takeru is a third-grader with black spiky hair who enjoys playing with Squid Girl, whom he calls Ika Nee-chan (lit. "Big Squid Sister").

=== Supporting characters ===
Goro Arashiyama (嵐山 悟郎, Arashiyama Gorō)
Voiced by: Yuichi Nakamura (Japanese); Jason Wishnov (Season 1), Blake Shepard (Season 2, OVAs) (English)
Eiko's childhood friend who works as a lifeguard; he is dedicated to protecting the sea and the people on the beach. He is usually serious about his job but will sometimes get riled up when Squid Girl messes about, most often when she pilfers shrimp from his meals. Despite being attractive to many girls, he himself has a crush on Eiko's older sister Chizuru, but does not have the courage to confess his feelings to her.
Sanae Nagatsuki (長月 早苗, Nagatsuki Sanae)
Voiced by: Kanae Itō (Japanese); Xanthe Huynh (Season 1), Emily Neves (Season 2, OVAs) (English)
Eiko's classmate and neighborhood friend who develops an obsessive crush on Squid Girl. She keeps a vast collection of Squid Girl photographs and memorabilia, and often stalks her. Although Squid Girl often retaliates violently to her advances, she enjoys it. She has a pet dog named Alex who's jealous of Squid Girl.
Nagisa Saito (斉藤 渚, Saitō Nagisa)
Voiced by: Azusa Kataoka (Japanese); Cristina Vee (Season 1), Stephanie Wittels (Season 2, OVAs) (English)
A surf-loving girl who works part-time at the Lemon. Unlike everyone else, she takes Squid Girl's conquest talk seriously and fears her greatly. Squid Girl, on the other hand, enjoys the fact that there is finally someone who fears her and thus she constantly teases Nagisa whenever she can. For a short period, Nagisa started dressing up as a guy in order to attract female customers and stop Squid Girl from teasing her, but she gave up after assuming she needs to be the one who recognizes her as an invader.^{S2 ep 2b}
Manager of Minamikaze (南風の店長, Minamikaze no Tenchō)
Voiced by: Rikiya Koyama (Japanese); Tony Oliver (Season 1), David Wald (Season 2 as Boss) (English)
The unnamed owner of a beach shack called Southern Winds (南風, Minamikaze). A rather strict manager, he hopes to capitalize on Squid Girl's popularity by making his own creepy kigurumi (mascot head) based on her likeness, filled with various gadgets that often go awry. The kigurumi is worn by his daughter Ayumi. He hopes to get the real Squid Girl to work at his shop.
Ayumi Tokita (常田 鮎美, Tokita Ayumi)
Voiced by: Ayako Kawasumi (Japanese); Sarah Williams (Season 1), Allison Sumrall (Season 2, OVAs) (English)
The daughter of the owner of The Southern Winds. Though her beauty attracts a lot of customers, she is painfully shy around people, especially men. In order to face people, her father fits her with a fake Squid Girl (ニセイカ娘, Nise ika musume) kigurumi mask. She occasionally works at the Lemon as a means to improve her sociability, and tends to be more social around Squid Girl and when interacting with animals. In the first drama CD, she confesses that if she isn't wearing her kigurumi mask, she can't properly express herself. She later gets a puppy, whom she names Rentarou, who looks up to Alex like a big brother.
Cindy Campbell (シンディー・キャンベル, Shindī Kyanberu)
Voiced by: Hitomi Nabatame (Japanese); Laura Post (Season 1), Shelley Calene-Black (Season 2, OVAs) (English)
A blonde-haired American research scientist and top MIT graduate, Cindy believes Squid Girl to be an exterrestrial alien. She constantly tries to get Squid Girl to admit to being one, so she can take her back to her lab for analysis and examination. She has a light rivalry with Sanae due to their shared obsession with Squid Girl. In one episode, she suspects Chizuru of being an alien because of the latter's extraordinary abilities.^{S1 ep 11b}
Harris (ハリス, Harisu) , Clark (クラーク, Kurāku) and Martin (マーティン, Mātin)
Harris Voiced by: Seiji Sasaki (Japanese); Phineas (Season 1), Andrew Love (Season 2, OVAs) (English)^{S1 Ep. 7}
Clark Voiced by: Anri Katsu (Japanese); Tony Oliver (Season 1), Jay Hickman (Season 2, OVAs) (English)^{S1 Ep. 7}
Martin Voiced by: Tetsuo Gotō (Japanese); Jonathan Meza (Season 1), Mark Laskowski (Season 2, OVAs) (English)^{S1 Ep. 7}
Cindy's research colleagues who were also top graduates at MIT. Harris is the Head of Experiments; he has dark skin and is the tallest of the three. Clark is the Head of Development; a slim guy with grey hair in a ponytail. Martin is the Head of Research; he is overweight with short brown hair, glasses, and a moustache. The three are research colleagues of Cindy Campbell who are devoted to investigating what they believe are extraterrestrials. Their experiments frequently result in inventions that cause problems for the staff at Lemon, leading other characters to refer to them as "The Three Stooges" (3バカトリオ, San Baka Torio).
Kiyomi Sakura (紗倉 清美, Sakura Kiyomi)
Voiced by: Kokoro Kikuchi (Japanese); Carrie Savage (Season 1), Brittney Karbowski (Season 2) (English)^{S1 Ep. 9}
A middle school student whom Squid Girl makes friends with after an attempt at doorbell ditching goes wrong. She has brown hair styled with two ponytails and wears glasses. She and her classmates form an Invasion Club with Squid Girl where they go do activities around town such as karaoke, bowling, and shopping.
Tatsuo Isozaki (磯崎 辰雄, Isozaki Tatsuo)
Voiced by: Shunzō Miyasaka (Japanese); Philip Hays (Season 2, OVAs) (English)
A lifeguard who works alongside Gorō. He is often judged by his appearance as being no good and usually tries to pick up girls with no results.^{S2 ep 1a}
Kozue Tanabe (田辺 梢, Tanabe Kozue)
Voiced by: Akemi Kanda (Japanese); Erika Harlacher (English)
A young girl with wavy light brown hair who appears to be the same age as Squid Girl and Kiyomi. She wears a long red dress, and a matching beret hat. She sometimes talks with Squid Girl, hinting that invading might not be the best thing to do as not all humans are bad.^{S1 ep. 12c} It is implied that she also comes from the sea, as she has a hat similar to Squid Girl's and makes statements that indicate she isn't human. The first syllables of her name spell out 'tako' (たこ), meaning "octopus."
Aiko Saitō (斉藤 愛子, Saitō Aiko)
Voiced by: Hiroko Ushida
Takeru's elementary school teacher and Nagisa's older sister. Aiko is jealous of Squid Girl's popularity with her students as she was once popular with them before she came into view. She loves kids.^{S2 ep. 2a} And she was Ruka's classmate during their time.
Ruka Shirosugi (白椙 留夏, Shirosugi Ruka)
Voiced by: Hiroko Ushida
The beach nurse who is sometimes harsh towards people who end up in her clinic multiple times and towards the lifeguards whenever they slack off. She hates returning injured persons for the third time in order to not disturb her slacker lifestyle, as shown opening all appliances after the first aid clinic closes. It was revealed that Aiko and Ruka were once classmates and that the latter was a gangster.
Yuta Matsumoto (松本 ユタ, Matsumoto Yūta)
Voiced by: Yuko Sanpei (Japanese); Marin Miller (English)
Takeru's best friend and classmate from school.

== Media ==
=== Manga ===
The manga by Masahiro Anbe was serialized in Akita Shoten's Weekly Shōnen Champion between July 2007 and February 2016. The series was compiled into 22 tankōbon volumes released between March 7, 2008, and May 15, 2016. It is published in Taiwan by Chingwin Publishing Group.

=== Anime ===
A 12-episode anime adaptation by Diomedéa aired on TV Tokyo between October 4 and December 20, 2010. The fifth and sixth DVD/Blu-ray volumes, released on April 20, 2011, and May 18, 2011, contained bonus "Mini-Ika Musume" side-stories. A second anime season, titled Shinryaku!? Ika Musume (侵略!?イカ娘), aired in Japan between September 26 and December 26, 2011. Both series were simulcasted by Crunchyroll. An original video animation (OVA) episode titled Shinryaku!! Ika Musume was bundled with the 12th manga volume released on August 8, 2012, and a second OVA was released with the 14th manga volume on June 7, 2013. Crunchyroll began streaming the OVAs in February 2014. A third OVA was released as a Blu-ray Disc bundled with the 17th manga volume on September 9, 2014.

Media Blasters licensed the anime in North America under the title Squid Girl. The first season was released on two DVD volumes on September 27 and December 6, 2011, respectively, followed by a Blu-ray Disc release on March 13, 2012. Media Blasters originally planned to release the second season but dropped those plans in March 2013. Both anime seasons and the OVAs were later licensed by Sentai Filmworks in 2016. The complete series, including both anime series and the OVAs, was released on Blu-ray and DVD on November 28, 2017, with the second season and OVAs receiving a new English dub cast. The first season was released on DVD in the United Kingdom by Manga Entertainment on August 13, 2012.

For the first anime series, the opening theme is "Shinryaku no Susume" (侵略ノススメ☆; Let's Invade!) by Ultra-Prism with Hisako Kanemoto, which was released on October 27, 2010, and the ending theme is "Metame Rhythm" (メタメリズム, Metamerizumu) by Kanae Itō, which was released on November 26, 2010. A character song, "Ika Aisu Tabe na Ika?" (イ・カ・ア・イ・ス食べなイカ?; Won't You Eat Squid Ice Cream?), sung by Kanemoto, was released on July 6, 2011, bundled with a DVD music video. For the second season, the opening theme is "High Powered" by Sphere, and the ending theme is "Kimi o Shiru Koto" (君を知ること; Learning About You) by Kanemoto. For the OVAs, the opening theme is "Let's Shinryaku Time!" (Let's☆侵略タイム!, Let's Shinryaku Taimu) by Ultra-Prism, and the ending theme is "Puzzle" (パズル, Pazuru) by Itō for the first two OVAs, and "Miser's Dream" (マイザーズドリーム, Maizāzu Dorīmu) by Itō for the third.

=== Other ===
A collaboration with Nintendo's Splatoon video game was announced on May 27, 2015. Along with collaboration artwork by Anbe posted on the official Japanese Twitter account, free clothing items based on Squid Girl's outfit were released for the game on August 6, 2015.

== Works cited ==
- "Ch." is shortened form for chapter and refers to a chapter number of the Squid Girl manga
- "Ep." is shortened form for episode and refers to an episode number of the Squid Girl anime. S1 refers to season 1 and S2 refers to season 2.
