= Grandpa Danger =

Franchise

絶体絶命でんぢゃらすじーさん (Zettai Zetsumei: Denjarasu Jii-san)
- Genre: Adventure, surreal humor
- Manga
- Written by: Kazutoshi Soyama
- Published by: Shogakukan
- Magazine: CoroCoro Comic
- Original run: October 2001 – March 2010
- Volumes: 20
- Anime television series
- Directed by: Yorifusa Yamaguchi
- Produced by: Naohiko Furuichi; Takeshi Sasamura
- Written by: Isamu Sasagawa
- Music by: Makoto Takou
- Studio: Studio Hibari
- Licensed by: NA: Viz Media
- Original network: TXN (TV Tokyo)
- Original run: April 4, 2004 – March 27, 2005
- Episodes: 51 (5 minutes per episode)
- Manga

Dangerous Jii-san Ja
- Written by: Kazutoshi Soyama
- Published by: Shogakukan
- Magazine: CoroCoro Comic
- Original run: April 2010 – February 15, 2017
- Volumes: 20
- Original video animation

Dangerous Jii-san Ja
- Directed by: Takashi Watanabe
- Music by: Hyadain
- Studio: J.C.Staff
- Released: July 27, 2012 – November 22, 2012
- Runtime: 30 minutes
- Episodes: 2
- Anime television series

Dangerous Jii-san Ja
- Directed by: Takashi Watanabe
- Music by: Hyadain
- Studio: J.C.Staff
- Original network: Kids Station
- Original run: October 20, 2012 – December 22, 2012
- Episodes: 10

Grandpa Danger (絶体絶命でんぢゃらすじーさん, Zettai Zetsumei: Denjarasu Jii-san; lit. 'Absolute Death: Dangerous Grandpa') is an adventure manga series by Kazutoshi Soyama first published by Shogakukan in CoroCoro Comic in October 2001. The series was adapted as a 51-episode anime broadcast on TV Tokyo from April 2004 to March 2005, which is licensed by Viz Media in North America as Grandpa Danger, and a series of video games. A second anime television series premiered on October 20, 2012.

== Characters ==
Grandpa（じーさん, Jhi-san）

Protagonist of this work. A self-proclaimed old man who teaches how to survive the dangers of the world.

Yosuke（ようすけ）

Grandpa's grandchild.

Principal（校長, Ko-cho-）

The principal of the school that Yosuke attends.

Gebe（ゲベ）

Grandpa's pet. Mysterious cat-like creature.

Koutei（コウテイ, 校庭）

Principal's dog.

Mr.Strongest（最強さん, Saikyo-san）

The strongest uncle in history.
