= Ace Angler: Fishing Spirits =

2022 video game

- Developers: Racjin Co., Ltd.
- Publisher: Bandai Namco Entertainment
- Platform: Nintendo Switch
- Release: JP: October 27, 2022; NA: October 28, 2022
- Genre: Fishing
- Modes: Single-player, multiplayer

Ace Angler: Fishing Spirits is a fishing video game published by Bandai Namco Entertainment. The sequel to the 2019 release Ace Angler, the game was released on the Nintendo Switch in Japan on October 27, 2022, and in Western markets on October 28, 2022.

== Gameplay ==
The game is set in an aquarium-themed amusement park and features story, arcade, online multiplayer, and party modes.

== Development and release ==
In June 2022, a trailer for Fishing Spirits: Fish & Play Aquarium was shown during the Japanese edition of the Nintendo Direct Mini: Partner Showcase presentation. The game was not mentioned in the Western presentation. The game was later renamed Ace Angler: Fishing Spirits. An announcement trailer for the game was released on August 15. The game's physical version was bundled with a special rod controller.

The game was released in Japan and Asia on October 27, 2022. This version of the game is accompanied by English subtitles. In Western markets, the game was released on October 28 via the Nintendo eShop.

== Reception ==
=== Pre-release ===
When describing the game's trailer, Luke Plunkett of Kotaku wrote: "Do not think of, say, Sega Bass Fishing here. This is not intended as an accurate representation of the sport/pastime of fishing. Instead, what you need to do here is imagine that Capcom's Monster Hunter series took over management of the Animal Crossing aquarium."

=== Critical reception ===
Reception

Aggregate score
Aggregator	Score
Metacritic	66/100

Review score
Publication	Score
TouchArcade	3/5

Ace Angler: Fishing Spirits received "mixed or average" reviews according to review aggregator Metacritic. Shaun Musgrave of TouchArcade gave the game a 3/5 rating.

== Manga adaptation ==
A manga adaptation began serialization in Shogakukan's Monthly CoroCoro Comic magazine on December 18, 2022.
