= Splatoon (manga) =

2015 manga based on the Splatoon video games

- The cover art for the first volume of the English localization

スプラトゥーン (Supuratūn)
- Genre: Action/comedy
- Created by: Sankichi Hinodeya
- Manga
- Written by: Sankichi Hinodeya
- Published by: Shogakukan
- English publisher: NA: Viz Media
- Magazine: CoroCoro Comic
- Original run: November 13, 2015 – January 27, 2022
- Volumes: 16
- Manga

Splatoon 3: Splatlands
- Written by: Sankichi Hinodeya
- Published by: Shogakukan
- English publisher: NA: Viz Media
- Magazine: CoroCoro Comic
- Original run: January 27, 2023 – present
- Volumes: 8 (Ongoing)

Splatoon (スプラトゥーン, Supuratūn) is an action-comedy Japanese manga based on Nintendo's video game series of the same name, and written and illustrated by Sankichi Hinodeya.

The manga follows the Blue Team, a group of Inklings that compete in Turf Wars, the primary online battle mode in the Splatoon franchise. Goggles, a member of the Blue Team, serves as the manga's protagonist.

An anime adaptation was released on the YouTube channel of CoroCoro starting in August 2017.

== Plot ==
Splatoon stars the Blue Team, a team of Inklings who compete in Turf Wars against other teams. The Blue Team consists of Goggles, Headphones, Specs, and Bobble Hat. While the Blue Team has a lower rank than other competitors, they aim to succeed in their battles regardless. They enter the CoroCoro Cup, a tournament to decide who is the best Turf War team. After arriving, the Blue Team realizes that others refer to them as "famous idiots". The Blue Team's first match is against the Yellow-Green Team, a top-ranked team. Despite this, though, the Blue Team defeats them.

== Characters ==
(Note: All of the characters here are all manga-original.)

- Blue Team
  - Goggles: A Rank C- male Inkling. He is silly, immature, and quite naïve. He tends to mostly ignore anyone else except for Bobble Hat, showing that she and Goggles have a special bond. He often can be found pantsing other Characters, mainly Rider, and often gets naked in public. He cannot hear his alarm clock very well, so he always leaves his house tired and disorientated. He also has a bad sleeping posture. The lunch he brings to practice is usually pickled plums made by his grandmother. He uses a Splattershot.
  - Headphones: A Rank B- female Inkling. She is a cool and level-headed Inkling, often acting as a big sister to the team despite them being the same age. Despite her calm and collected demeanour, she frequently becomes irritated by Goggles and his antics. She uses a Classic Squiffer and other charger-type weapons.
  - Bobble Hat: A Rank C female Inkling. Unlike most of her teammates, Bobble Hat seems to enjoy Goggles' actions. She and her big smile show her innocence and is pretty much always smiling, even in the face of danger. She uses a Slosher.
  - Specs: a Rank C+ male Inkling who is leader of the team. He is a nerdy Inkling who can be very anxious but tries to hide it as best as he can. He tries to come across as level-headed and tends to flaunt his knowledge a lot but becomes upset if no one is listening to him. He uses an Octobrush Nouveau.
- Yellow-Green Team This Team is led by Rider. Despite Rider hating teamwork from his initial appearance, he brought them together so he could compete.
  - Rider: an S+ rank male Inkling, arguable the best roller wielder, whose weapon of choice is the Gold Dynamo Roller. He believes in himself is his training philosophy. he also takes good care of his weapon. He has been pantsed repeatedly by Goggles, and he gets very angry with him when he does it, often rolling over Goggles with the whichever dynamo roller he has on hand.
  - Stealth Goggles: A male Inkling who uses the Jet Squelcher. He is said to love airsoft sports.
  - School Uniform: A female Inkling who uses the .52 Gal Deco She is said to be a class representative, indicating that she attends school. She is also seen to be good friends with Bamboo as she only joined back with Rider if Bamboo would join as well.
  - Bamboo Hat: A female Inkling who uses the Heavy Splatling. She is said to have a hobby in wood carving.
- Orange Team They are all very punctual and also clean up themselves after their battles. They follow their Inkling Manual to read their enemy's actions and tactics. It works every time, except when something unexpected happens or no tactic is involved.
  - Army, one of the S4. A male Inkling who uses the N-ZAP '85. He applies his own face paint. He also came from a noble family.
  - B-Sailor: A male Inkling who uses the Splatterscope.
  - Octarian Jacket: A female Inkling who uses the Rapid Blaster.
  - W-Sailor: A female Inkling who uses the Dualie Squelcher.

== Release ==
Splatoon first released in Japan on February 29, 2016, through the CoroCoro Comic magazine. It first released in English on December 14, 2017, translated by Viz Media.

On August 13, 2017, the manga was adapted into an animated series, starring Mikako Komatsu as Goggles. The adaptation released on CoroCoro's YouTube channel.

With the series covering the plot of Splatoon 3, the manga was renamed as Splatoon 3: Splatlands with its volume number reset. It was published by Viz Media in the United States on April 9, 2024.

The manga series was released digitally on the Nintendo Switch on March 13, 2025, by Shogakukan, with indieszero developing the application.

== Reception ==
Dale Bashir of IGN Southeast Asia called the manga "a true shōnen interpretation of Splatoon ... that is quite faithful to the regular player's experience with the game".
