= Callie and Marie =

Splatoon characters and idols

- Splatoon characters
- Artwork of Callie (left) and Marie (right)
- First appearance: Splatoon (2015)
- Voiced by: keity.pop (Callie); Mari Kikuma (Marie)

In-universe information
- Species: Inkling

Callie (Japanese: アオリ, Hepburn: Aori) and Marie (Japanese: ホタル, Hepburn: Hotaru) are a duo of characters in the Splatoon series. They first appeared in Splatoon (2015) as a pop music duo known as the Squid Sisters (Japanese: シオカラーズ, Hepburn: Shiokarāzu; lit. "Sea O'Colors" in Japanese) and have appeared in every subsequent entry in the series.

The duo was conceptualized by Splatoon's art director Seita Inoue for the purpose of accompanying in-game Splatfest events. As Splatfests prompted players to choose one of two teams presented in a questionnaire format, Inoue wanted to make constrasting characters that would sponsor each side. They were initially designed as shrine maidens that would interpret and relay divine messages that would become the Splatfest prompt. Deeming this occuptation "too formal", the development tream opted instead to make them resident idol musicianas; they together were envisioned as having an "edgy" and laid-back disposition, more akin to Western celebrities than traditional Japanese idols.

Callie and Marie have both been praised by critics. They are considered the mascots and face of the Splatoon series, and have made cameo appearances in other franchises such as the Super Smash Bros. series. They have starred in real-world concerts in the form of holograms and have established themselves as fan-favorite characters.

== Concept and creation ==
=== Design ===
The characters went through multiple designs and outfits during development.

Callie and Marie were created for and first appeared in Splatoon for the Wii U in 2015. They were part of a pop duo known as the Squid Sisters, where they were the hosts of Inkopolis News. Their role was to provide updates and map rotations to the player whenever they booted up the game, while being the singers behind some of the game's soundtrack, such as "Calamari Inkantation". The names Callie and Marie may come from the Italian word calamari. Callie in particular was meant to invoke the image of a "Western" singer when she sang, while Marie was meant to sound like a "Folk" musician, who "put her fists into the song".

When designing the characters, the development team was not aiming for typical Japanese idols, but an "edgy" idol more typically seen in Western countries. Artist Seita Inoue also wanted to capture the "homemade feel" of upcoming idol presentations on radio programs and late-night shows, illustrating them as characters whose popularity had not quite exploded. The designs for them were originally conceived by one of the developers who created the generic non-playable characters for the title, with Inoue drawing their art afterward. When writing the pair, the development team were very particular in how they would speak, with some speaking up if they felt a line was out of character for one of the girls. In early drafts of the game, they were originally shrine maidens, who received messages from "God". These "messages" would have actually been sound waves that traveled from present day conversations to another planet and back to Splatoon's version of Earth, which was set 12,000 years in the future. The duo receive these, and misinterpret them as coming from a divine power.

Several elements of their design were intended to reference their "squid" nature, such as the splay of their fingers, and their pupils which resemble those of a squid. The dark makeup around their eyes on the other hand was intended to reference makeup used by punk rock groups. Several outfit designs were considered, with military or casual themes suggested, though the development team focused on differentiating them from the player models. Multiple hair styles were also considered, and while they were being decided, they chose to go with a sleeker look for the characters. The finalized outfits feature patterns on their dresses meant to look like sequins, "simple yet shiny". As an additional detail, Callie was given a beauty mark on her left cheek below her eye, while Marie was given one on her right.

=== Voice acting ===
Callie is voiced by keity.pop, while Marie is voiced by Mari Kikuma. During their auditions, the actresses only knew the characters were to feature in a video game; the pair had not met each other prior, and were unaware the characters were a duo or associated with Nintendo. During the audition, they were given text they did not understand, meant to represent the Inklings' native language. The text was accompanied with musical notes, and the pair were told to recognize what they could. After getting the roles this repeated for subsequent voice overs, with the two working side by side to voice the characters. keity.pop approached the songs in the manner she normally spoke, while Kikuma focused on where she could put the "most excitement" into the melody. To get a better feel for their roles, keity.pop wore makeup akin to "Western" musicians coupled with miniskirts and pink Dr. Martens boots. Kikuma on the other hand listened to folk songs daily to get a feel for them.

== Appearances ==
=== Splatoon ===
Splatoon was the first game in the Splatoon series, and the first to feature Callie and Marie as characters. Callie and Marie appear as the hosts of the game, and news reporters of Inkopolis. The two also appear in the games campaign under the aliases Agent 1 and 2. During each Splatfest, Callie and Marie would each pick a side and represent it, while performing live in Inkopolis during each Splatfest. The final Splatfest was Callie vs. Marie, and players were forced to choose one. Marie would win the final Splatfest.

In-game backstory material elaborates that, despite the duo being referred to as the Squid Sisters, Callie and Marie are actually cousins, and are the granddaughters of Cap’n Craig Cuttlefish, a veteran of a major conflict known as the Great Turf War. The two were born in Calamari County, a rural area hours away from Inkopolis. The two rose to fame after winning a local singing contest in Calamari County, and went on to become the news hosts of Inkopolis. Callie's personality is shown to be energetic and cheerful, while Marie's is more laid back and relaxed.

Prior to the release of Splatoon 2, Nintendo released the Squid Sister Stories, a series of online vignettes explaining what happened to the characters between games. After the final Splatfest, Callie and Marie began going their separate ways. Marie would travel to the countryside to visit her parents, and upon returning, Marie would learn that Callie had been reported missing. Marie appears as in the campaign of Splatoon 2, recruiting the player to try and save the great Zapfish, as well as the missing Callie. Callie turned out to be an antagonist under the influence of the villain D.J. Octavio, and she was saved from his influence. In the final Splatfest of Splatoon 2, Chaos vs. Order, Callie supported Team Chaos, and Marie supported Team Order.

Callie and Marie return in Splatoon 3 in the campaign, guiding the player through Alterna. On February 28, 2023, the first wave of downloadable content for Splatoon 3 released, allowing players to return to the original Inkopolis, and with it, Callie and Marie return as its idols; however, they no longer pick a side during the Splatfest, nor do they broadcast their news station. They continue to perform for each Splatfest.

=== Other appearances ===
The Squid Sisters appear as an assist trophy and Spirit in Super Smash Bros. Ultimate, where they sing one of two songs and zoom in the camera, shrinking the stage boundaries and making it easier to knock out fighters. Later in the game's life, purchasable Mii costumes based on the duo were introduced in 2020. In-game costumes for the duo were added to Super Mario Maker on July 8, 2016, alongside an in-game event. Characters based on the duo were added to Animal Crossing: New Leaf on November 2, 2016.

In celebration of sales for Splatoon reaching one million units in less than a year, a live holographic concert of the Squid Sisters was announced by Nintendo in December 2015. The concert took place on January 30, 2016 in Chiba, Japan. More concerts were held worldwide, such as in Paris, France on July 12, 2016, and they continued into 2022, eventually featuring Off the Hook and Deep Cut, the idols of Splatoon 2 and 3 respectively. The concerts would eventually feature guest star K.K. Slider from the Animal Crossing series as a DJ.

== Promotion and reception ==
Official plushies of Callie and Marie created by San-Ei were revealed at the Tokyo Game Show in September 2015 alongside two other Inkling plushies. The plushies were officially released in December of that year. In April 2016, Amiibo figures of Callie and Marie were announced to come in a two pack. The amiibo were released on July 8, 2016. The amiibo were rereleased for the launch of Splatoon 3 in 2022. During the final Splatfest, Nintendo released printable alternate cover art for Splatoon as a celebration and way for players to further show their support to their side.

Callie and Marie have been subject to a large amount of praise from fans and critics, and the two have been considered the primary mascots of the Splatoon games. Initial reception of the characters in the original Splatoon from critics was mixed, however. In the games reviews, Jose Otero of IGN said that the game could "do without the Squid Sisters", criticizing their cutscenes that couldn't be skipped, while on the contrary, Ryan Bates of GameRevolution wrote that the Squid Sisters gave the player the proper introduction to the game. The Squid Sisters were incredibly popular amongst fans, and the final Splatfest was noted to cause an uproar amongst fans for forcing them to choose one over the other, with Polygon describing it as "almost cruel". USGamer's staff considered them potentially two of the best Nintendo characters introduced in the 2010s, praising their music and chemistry. While they acknowledged that the characters that replaced them in Splatoon 2, Pearl and Marina, were good characters in their own right, "We have to hand it to the originals, though."

The Squid Sister Stories prologue was praised by fans and its events were compared to real-world loss. Nadia Oxford of USGamer described the events of the series to be "tragically effective", and a "real heart-punch for anyone who's been part of a dissolving friendship or relationship". The influence the events had on Splatoon 2 were praised by Connor Sheridan of GamesRadar+, describing it as a "fresh idea" and a "pleasant surprise", while also saying "I don't know if my heart could stand a war between the Squid Sisters". Fan speculation of the Squid Sisters Stories was abundant, with the creation of fanart and different theories, going as far as speculation on whether or not Callie had died. The stories and usage of the Squid Sisters in the lead up for Splatoon 2 were considered very effective viral marketing.

As a result of the concerts, the Squid Sisters have been described as and compared to vocaloids like Hatsune Miku, with Shacknews saying that the Squid Sisters were superior and were "totally killing it". Other publications, such as Kotaku, wrote that the Squid Sisters made great virtual idols, and they are recognized as pop icons by Polygon. The Squid Sisters were used in a study on music artist projections and holograms from PUCRS.
