= Black Channel (manga) =

Japanese manga series

- First tankōbon volume cover

ブラックチャンネル (Burakku Channeru)
- Genre: Black comedy
- Manga
- Written by: Satoshi Kisaichi
- Published by: Shogakukan
- Imprint: Tentomushi CoroCoro Comics
- Magazine: Monthly CoroCoro Comic (October 15, 2020 – May 15, 2026); Weekly CoroCoro Comic (May 17, 2026 – present)
- Original run: October 15, 2020 – present
- Volumes: 15
- Original net animation
- Released: August 31, 2020 – present
- Manga

Black Channel: Breaking the Wall
- Written by: Satoshi Kisaichi
- Published by: Shogakukan
- Magazine: Monthly CoroCoro Comic
- Original run: June 15, 2022 – August 12, 2022
- Original net animation

Black Channel: Breaking the Wall
- Released: August 19, 2022 – September 24, 2022
- Novel series
- Written by: Shin Sukitake
- Illustrated by: Satoshi Kisaichi
- Published by: Shogakukan
- English publisher: Shogakukan Junior Bunko
- Original run: January 27, 2023 – present
- Volumes: 4
- Anime television series

Black Channel (Japanese: ブラックチャンネル, Hepburn: Burakku Channeru) is a Japanese manga series written and illustrated by Satoshi Kisaichi. It originally began serialization as a pilot version in Shogakukan's Monthly CoroCoro Comic magazine between April and August 2020, before beginning regular serialization in October of that year. The series has been compiled into 15 volumes as of August 2026. A novel adaptation written by Shin Sukitake began publication in January 2023. Short-form original net animation videos began being posted to YouTube in August 2020. An anime television series adaptation has been announced.

== Plot ==
Black, a YouTuber who is actually a demon, goes around filming the lives of unfortunate people, even if it involves recording their misery. He aims to document humanity's "true sides" by making deals with people to be featured on YouTube, only for him to turn these deals against them and show their true nature.

== Characters ==
Black (ブラック, Burakku)
Voiced by: Yuya Hozumi (ONA)
The title character, he is a YouTuber who finds pleasure in filming unfortunate incidents and people's misery. He tricks people into collaborating with them in exchange for granting their desires, only to expose their true nature. In the process, he uses his powers to cleanse people of their evil tendencies, as well as erase people's memories to make them forget about ever working with him.
Camera-chan (カメラちゃん, Kamera-chan)
Voiced by: Akiha Matsui (ONA)
Black's assistant, who takes the form of a small person with a video camera for a head. Camera-chan has the ability to transform into various objects when needed by Black's antics.
Satoshi (さとし)
Voiced by: Akiha Matsui (ONA)
An elementary school student who becomes involved with Black and Camera-chan's activities. He is also active as a YouTuber, although he is not very popular.
Hime Ichii (市井 ひめ, Ichii Hime)
Satoshi's schoolmate and the most popular girl in school. While she acts friendly towards others, in reality she has an insecure personality.

== Development ==
Kisaichi originally began working on Black Channel after his previous work, which was released on Shogakukan's MiraCoro Comic Vol. 1 compilation issue, was not picked up for serialization. He felt frustrated at not winning last time and wanted to make a work that would win. Growing up, Kisaichi was fond of manga that were "powerful, energetic, and exciting," with him wanting to get serialized in CoroCoro because he wanted his work to be read by elementary students.

== Media ==
=== Manga ===
The manga was initially released on the MiraCoro Comic Vol. 2 compilation issue on January 17, 2020, and was later voted the most popular choice among the issue's featured manga. It then began a pilot serialization on Shogakukan's Monthly CoroCoro Comic magazine on April 15, 2020, before starting regularization in the magazine on October 15, 2020. The series moved to the Weekly CoroCoro Comic website on May 17, 2026. The first tankōbon volume was released on January 28, 2021; fifteen volumes have been released as of August 28, 2026. A spin-off manga titled Black Channel: Breaking the Wall was serialized in the same magazine from June 15 to August 12, 2022.

No.	Release date	ISBN
1	January 28, 2021	978-4-09-143264-3
2	June 28, 2021	978-4-09-143316-9
3	October 28, 2021	978-4-09-143348-0
4	February 28, 2022	978-4-09-143376-3
5	June 28, 2022	978-4-09-143524-8; 978-4-09-943114-3 (SE)
6	September 28, 2022	978-4-09-143550-7
7	February 28, 2023	978-4-09-143581-1
8	July 18, 2023	978-4-09-143639-9
9	December 27, 2023	978-4-09-143674-0
10	June 27, 2024	978-4-09-149735-2
11	December 26, 2024	978-4-09-149876-2
12	May 28, 2025	978-4-09-154034-8
13	December 26, 2025	978-4-09-154088-1
14	April 28, 2026	978-4-09-154257-1
15	August 28, 2026	978-4-09-154326-4

=== Novel ===
A novel adaptation written by Shin Sukitake and illustrated by Kisaichi began publication under Shogakukan's Shogakukan Junior Bunko imprint on January 27, 2023. Four volumes have been released as of February 20, 2026.

No.	Release date	ISBN
1	January 27, 2023	978-4-09-231445-0
2	August 25, 2023	978-4-09-231460-3
3	September 27, 2024	978-4-09-231495-5
4	February 20, 2026	978-4-09-231542-6

=== Anime ===
An official YouTube channel featuring animated videos was launched on August 31, 2020. The series also had a collaboration with the film Case Closed: The Scarlet Bullet. A short-form anime adaptation of Breaking the Wall was released between August 19 and September 24, 2022.

An anime television series adaptation was announced on April 15, 2026.

== Reception ==
The series was nominated for the 2022 Next Manga Award, ultimately placing 20th in the Print Manga category. The series was nominated for the Best Children's Manga award at the 68th Shogakukan Manga Award.
