= Masahiro Anbe =

Japanese manga artist

Masahiro Anbe 安部 真弘
- Born: May 4, 1983 (age 43) Hiratsuka, Kanagawa, Japan
- Area: Manga artist
- Notable works: Squid Girl

Masahiro Anbe (安部 真弘, Anbe Masahiro; born May 4, 1983) is a Japanese manga artist best known for his work Squid Girl. He was formerly assistant/student of Jun Sadogawa.

== Works ==
| Title | Year | Notes | Refs |
|---|---|---|---|
| Squid Girl | 2007–2016 | Serialized in Weekly Shōnen Champion; Published by Akita Shoten in 22 volumes | |
| Atsumare! Fushigi Kenkyū-bu | 2016–2024 | | |
