= Nintendo Entertainment System =

Home video game console

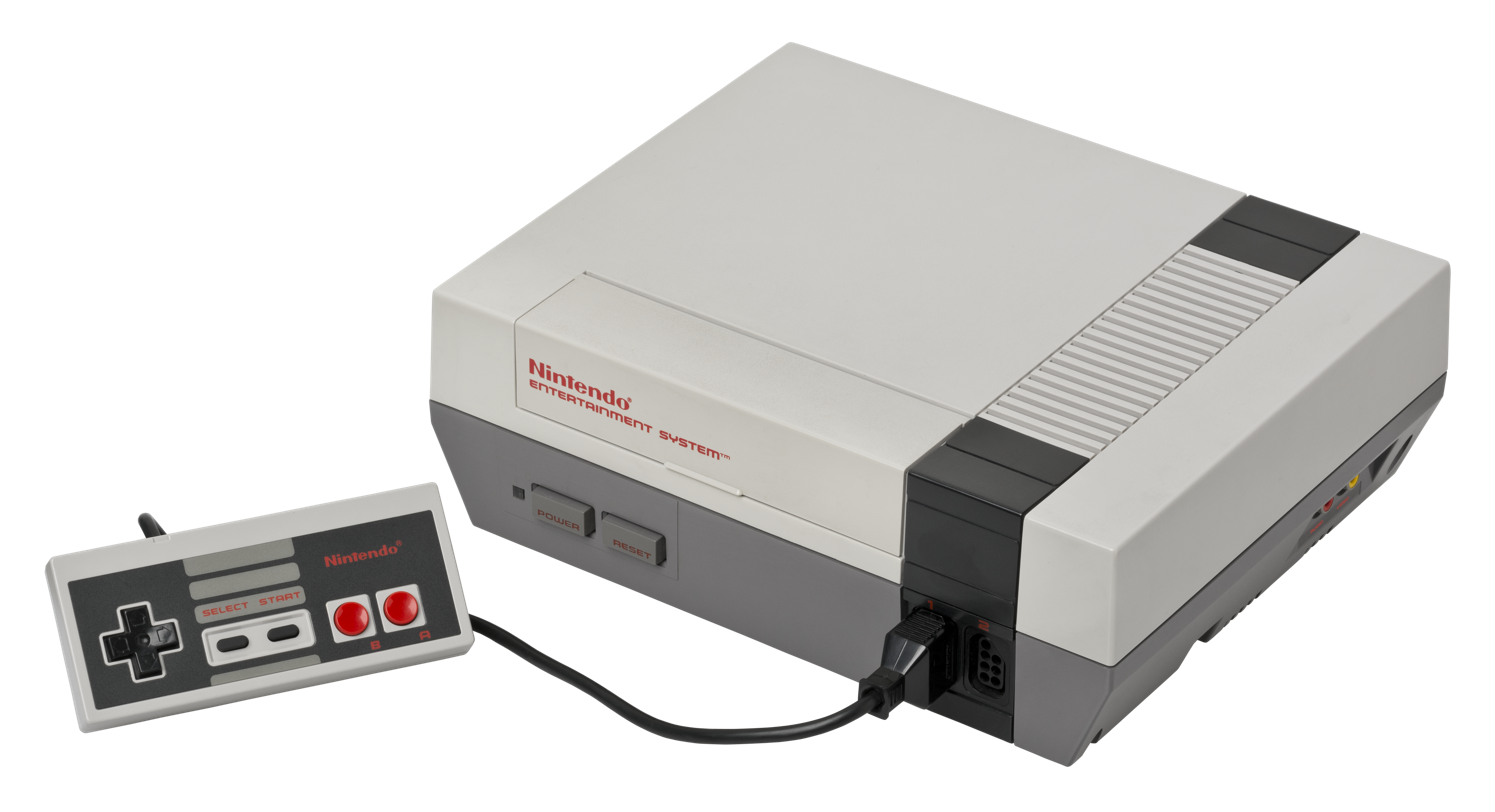
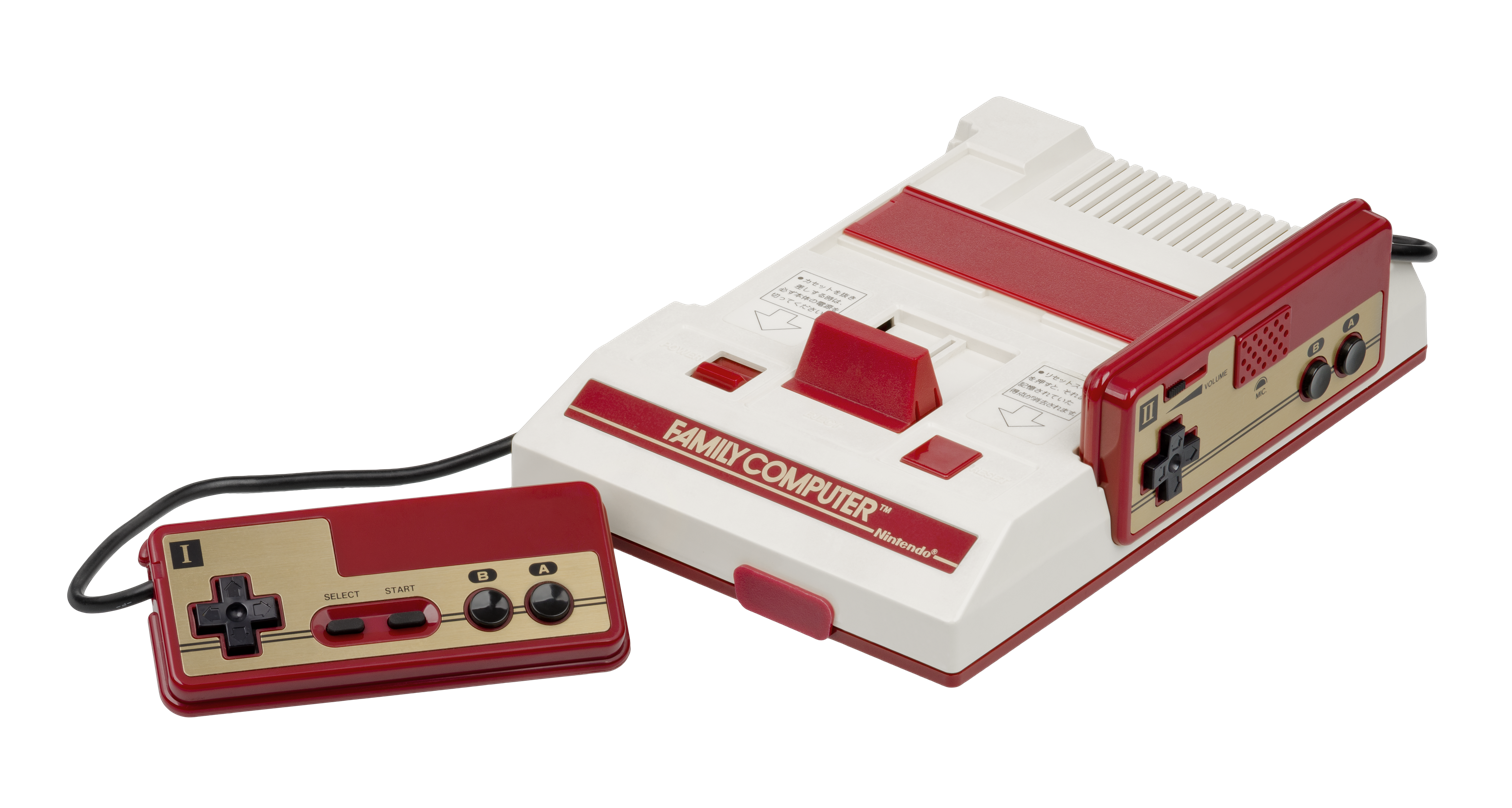
- Top: NES Control Deck with detachable controller Bottom: Family Computer main unit with hardwired controllers
- Also known as: KOR: Hyundai Comboy; IND: Samurai Electronic TV Game System
- Developer: Nintendo R&D2
- Manufacturer: Nintendo
- Type: Home video game console
- Generation: Third
- Released: July 15, 1983: JP: July 15, 1983; NA: October 18, 1985 (Note: First released in New York City test markets on October 18, 1985, followed by Los Angeles in February 1986 and the rest of North America on September 27, 1986.); EU: September 1, 1986 (Note: For distribution purposes, most of Europe and Australasia were divided into two regions by Nintendo. The first of these regions consisted of mainland Europe (excluding Italy) and Scandinavia, where the NES was released from 1986 to 1988, depending on the country. The console was released in the second region, consisting of the United Kingdom, Ireland, Italy, Australia, and New Zealand, in 1987.); UK/IRE/ITA/AU: 1987 (Note: For distribution purposes, most of Europe and Australasia were divided into two regions by Nintendo. The first of these regions consisted of mainland Europe (excluding Italy) and Scandinavia, where the NES was released from 1986 to 1988, depending on the country. The console was released in the second region, consisting of the United Kingdom, Ireland, Italy, Australia, and New Zealand, in 1987.); IND/TW: 1987; KOR: 1989; CHL: 1991; ZA: 1993; BRA: March 1993
- Introductory price: ¥14,800 (equivalent to ¥19,990 in 2024); US$180 (equivalent to $540 in 2025)
- Discontinued: NA/EU/AU: August 14, 1995; BRA/KOR/TW: Early/Mid 2003; JP: September 25, 2003
- Units sold: 61.91 million
- Media: Nintendo Entertainment System Game Pak
- CPU: Ricoh 2A03 @ 1.79 MHz; Ricoh 2A07 @ 1.66 MHz (Note: The 2A03 is in NTSC consoles, and the 2A07 is in PAL consoles. Both CPUs are based on the MOS Technology 6502; see technical specifications section.)
- Memory: 2 KB work RAM; 2 KB video RAM; 256 bytes sprite RAM
- Display: 256 × 240 px
- Graphics: PPU (Ricoh 2C02)
- Sound: APU, 5 channels: 2 pulse wave, triangle wave, white noise, DPCM
- Controller input: 2 controller ports (Note: The original Famicom has two hardwired game controllers and a single port for additional input devices. See game controllers section.)
- Best-selling game: Pack-in: Super Mario Bros. (40 million); Standalone: Super Mario Bros. 3 (18 million) (list)
- Predecessor: Color TV-Game
- Successor: Super Nintendo Entertainment System
- Related: Famicom Disk System; Famicom 3D System
- Made in: Japan

The Nintendo Entertainment System (NES) is a home video game console developed and marketed by Nintendo. It was released as the Family Computer (Famicom) (Note: Japanese: ファミリーコンピュータ (ファミコン), Hepburn: Famirī Konpyūta (Famikon)) in Japan on July 15, 1983, and as the NES in test markets in the United States on October 18, 1985, followed by a nationwide launch on September 27, 1986. The NES was distributed in Europe, Australia, and parts of Asia throughout the 1980s. It was Nintendo's first programmable home console, succeeding the Color TV-Game line of dedicated consoles, and primarily competed with Sega's Master System in the third generation of video game consoles.

The engineer Masayuki Uemura designed the 8-bit Famicom after Nintendo's president Hiroshi Yamauchi called for a simple, cheap console that could run arcade games from cartridges. Its hardware was based on that of Nintendo's arcade game Donkey Kong (1981) and its controller design was reused from Nintendo's portable Game & Watch hardware. For Western markets, Lance Barr and Don James redesigned it as the NES to resemble a video cassette recorder. To aid its acceptance in stores, Nintendo released add-ons such as the Zapper, a light gun for shooting games, and R.O.B., a toy robot. In Japan, Nintendo released the Famicom Disk System add-on to distribute games on floppy disks, although it gradually reduced support for the peripheral due to hardware constraints.

Nintendo released the NES in the aftermath of the video game crash of 1983. In Japan and North America, it quickly dominated and gave Nintendo a near-monopoly on the home console market. Unlike the previous market leader, Atari, Nintendo sought the support of third-party developers, such as Capcom, Hudson Soft, Konami, Namco, Enix, and Square. Its restrictive licensing terms, which included platform exclusivity and a five-game-per-year limit, led to accusations of antitrust violations in the US, culminating in a 1991 settlement with the Federal Trade Commission. Nintendo sold 61.91 million consoles; though dominant in Japan and North America, the NES performed worse in Europe, (Note: The NES was the overall bestselling system worldwide of its time. In Japan and the United States, it controlled 85–90% of the market. In Europe, it was at most in 10–12% of households. Nintendo sold 61.91 million NES units worldwide: 19.35 million in Japan, 34 million in the Americas, and 8.56 million in other regions.) where it faced competition from the Master System and home computers such as the Commodore 64 and ZX Spectrum.

Nintendo released a successor, the Super Nintendo Entertainment System, on November 21, 1990, but continued to support the NES into the 16-bit era. It discontinued the NES on August 14, 1995 and the Famicom on September 25, 2003. The NES is regarded as one of the most influential consoles, as it helped revitalize the American gaming industry following the 1983 crash and pioneered the now-standard business model of licensing third-party developers to produce and distribute games. Several NES games, including Super Mario Bros. (1985), The Legend of Zelda (1986), Castlevania (1986), Dragon Quest (1986), Mega Man (1987) and Final Fantasy (1987), became major franchises.

== History ==
=== Background ===
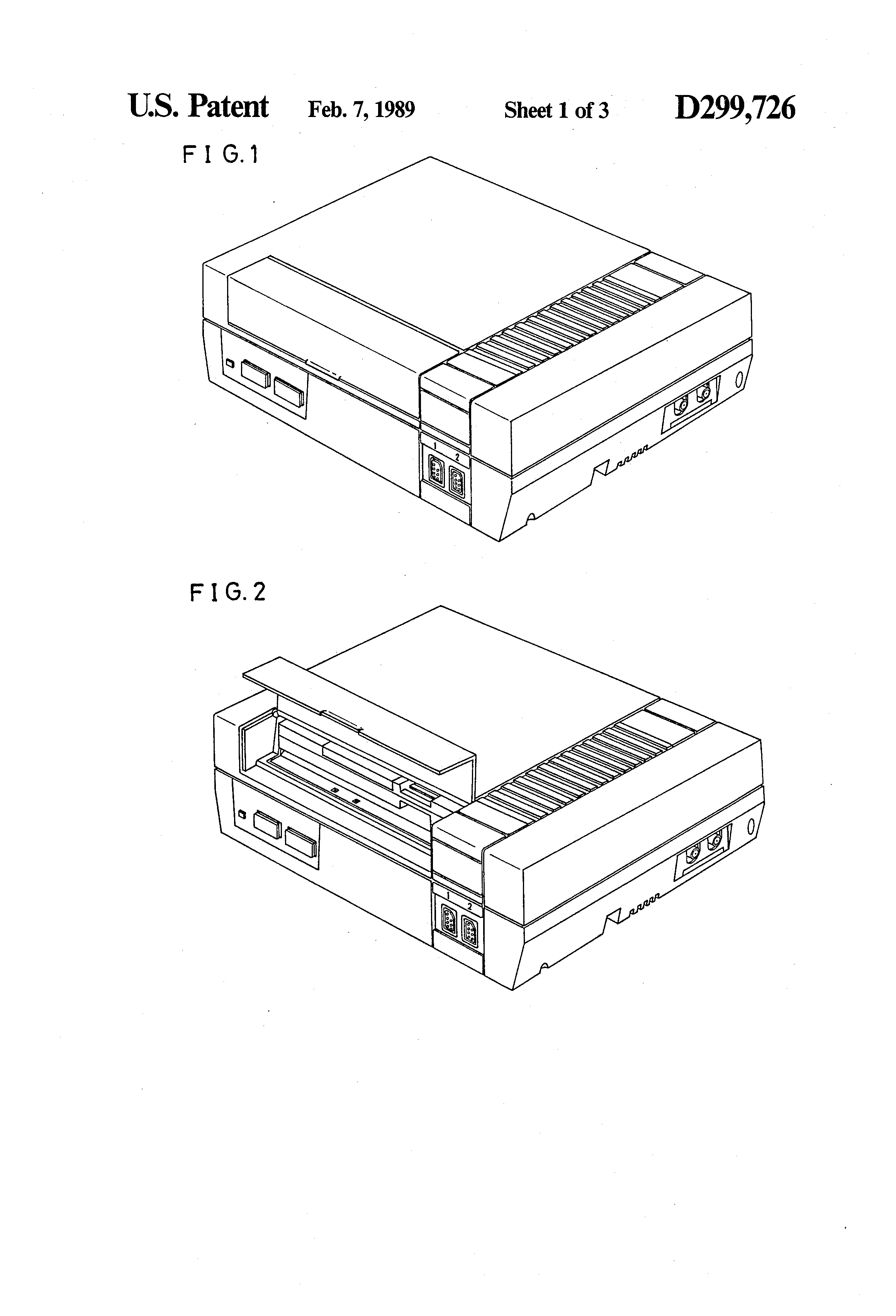
The design of the NES in a 1989 United States patent by Masayuki Yukawa

The video game industry experienced rapid growth and popularity from the late 1970s to the early 1980s, marked by the golden age of arcade games and the second generation of consoles. Games like Space Invaders (1978) became a phenomenon across arcades worldwide, while home consoles such as the Atari 2600 and home computers such as the Commodore 64 and the Intellivision gained a foothold in the American market. Many companies emerged to capitalize on the growing industry, including the card and toy company Nintendo.

Nintendo president Hiroshi Yamauchi realized that breakthroughs in the electronics industry meant that entertainment products could be produced at lower prices. Companies such as Atari and Magnavox were already selling gaming devices for use with television sets to moderate success. Yamauchi negotiated a license with Magnavox for the patents on the technology used in the Magnavox Odyssey. Since Nintendo's operation was not yet sophisticated enough to design its own hardware, Yamauchi forged an alliance with Mitsubishi Electric and hired several Sharp Electronics employees to assist in developing the Color TV-Game 6 and the Color TV-Game 15 in Japan. This was followed by the handheld Game & Watch series. The successes of these consoles gave Yamauchi the confidence to expand Nintendo's influence in the fledgling video game industry.

In 1978, Yamauchi split Nintendo into separate research and development divisions. He appointed Masayuki Uemura as head of Nintendo Research & Development 2. Yamauchi, through extensive discussions with Uemura and other engineers, recognized the potential of the developing console beyond gaming. He envisioned a home computer system disguised as a toy, which could significantly expand Nintendo's reach if it became popular with children. This popularity would drive demand for games, with Nintendo as the sole provider. Indeed, by 1980 several systems had already been released in Japan by both American and Japanese companies. Yamauchi tasked Uemura with developing a system that would be superior to its competitors and difficult to replicate for at least a year. Uemura's main challenge was economic rather than technological; Yamauchi wanted the system to be affordable enough for widespread household adoption, aiming for a price of ¥9,800 (less than $75) compared to existing machines priced at ¥30,000 to ¥50,000 ($200 to $350). The new system had to outperform other systems, both Japanese and American, while being significantly more affordable.

=== Inception ===
As development progressed on the new video game system, engineers sought Yamauchi's guidance on its features. They questioned whether to include a disk drive, keyboard, data port, as well as the potential for a modem, expanded memory, and other computer-like capabilities. Yamauchi ultimately instructed Uemura to prioritize simplicity and affordability, omitting these peripherals entirely. Game cartridges, which Uemura saw as "less intimidating" to consumers, were chosen as the format. The team designed the system with 2,000 bytes of random-access memory (RAM).

The console's hardware was largely based on arcade video games, particularly the hardware for Namco's Galaxian (1979) and Nintendo's own Donkey Kong (1981), with the goal of matching their powerful sprite and scrolling capabilities in a home system. A test model was constructed in October 1982 to verify the functionality of the hardware, and work began on programming tools. Because 65xx CPUs had not been manufactured or sold in Japan by that time, no cross-development software was available, and had to be developed from scratch. Early Famicom games were written on a PC-8001 computer. LEDs on an 8×8 grid were used in conjunction with graphing paper scanned with a digitizer to design graphics, as no such software design tools existed at the time.

The codename for the project was GameCom, but Masayuki Uemura's wife proposed the name Famicom, arguing that "In Japan, 'pasokon' is used to mean a personal computer, but it is neither a home nor personal computer. Perhaps we could say it is a family computer." (Note: The "Famicom" name was prevalent among the general public in Japan, but Nintendo solely used the "Family Computer" moniker there because Sharp Corporation held the similarly-pronounced "Famicon" trademark for its Family Convection Oven, a microwave oven released in 1979 that was classified as a "consumer electronic device". As such, Nintendo could not reuse the trademark under Japanese law due to the overlap in classification between the two products. Sharp eventually transferred the trademark to Nintendo on October 17, 1985, but the latter retained the "Family Computer" moniker until the console's discontinuation; the former used the "Famicom" name for all of its licensed console variants.) Meanwhile, Yamauchi decided that the console should use a red white, and gold color scheme after seeing a billboard for DX Antenna (a Japanese antenna manufacturer) that used those colors. This decision was reinforced due to Yamauchi's favorite scarf sharing the same color scheme.

=== Development ===
The Famicom was influenced by the ColecoVision, Coleco's competition against the Atari 2600 in the United States; the ColecoVision's top-seller was a port of Nintendo's Donkey Kong. The project's chief manager Takao Sawano brought a ColecoVision home to his family, who was impressed by its smooth graphics, which contrasted with the flicker and slowdown commonly seen on Atari 2600 games. Uemura said the ColecoVision set the bar for the Famicom. The team, wanting to surpass the ColecoVision and match the more powerful Donkey Kong arcade hardware, took a Donkey Kong arcade cabinet to chip manufacturer Ricoh for analysis, which led to Ricoh producing the Picture Processing Unit (PPU) chip for the Famicom. Donkey Kong would also influence the development of the system's audio capabilities, with that game's composer and Nintendo's lead sound engineer, Yukio Kaneoka, finding that commonly-available programmable sound generators of the day could not adequately render the game's soundtrack, for which Kaneoka had designed a primitive sample-based sound system. Kaneoka therefore designed the Famicom's sound chip to be able to render a wider variety of waveforms than was common in either consoles or home computers at the time.

During development, Yamauchi directed engineers to reduce costs by removing non-essential components. However, he insisted on including a low-cost circuit and connector that allowed the CPU to send or receive unmodified signals, enabling future hardware expansions such as modems or keyboards. This built-in capability led some within Nintendo to refer to the console as "Yamauchi's Trojan Horse": it entered homes as a simple gaming device with two controllers, and yet contained features far beyond its apparent function. A 1989 corporate report later acknowledged, "In the initial stages of [the system's] development, we foresaw these possibilities... we built a data communications function into the system." Lead engineer Masayuki Uemura credited luck for this foresight, while colleague Genyo Takeda remarked that Uemura's lack of experience allowed him to attempt what others might have deemed unfeasible. Design decisions were also carefully considered. Yamauchi took a hands-on role in determining the controller layout, casing shape, and overall aesthetic. The final design featured a directional pad and two buttons on the right controller, a microphone on the left controller, rounded edges, and a red and white color scheme deliberately made to appear more like a toy than a computer.

Original plans called for the Famicom's cartridges to be the size of a cassette tape, but they ultimately ended up being twice as large. Careful design attention was paid to the cartridge connectors, as loose and faulty connections often plagued arcade machines. Because it necessitated 60 connection lines for the memory and expansion, Nintendo decided to produce its own connectors. Each cartridge typically contained two primary chips: one for the game's program code (up to 32 kilobytes), and another for graphical data used to render on-screen characters (up to 8 kilobytes). Nintendo's R&D3 team designed the "UNROM" cartridge, which enabled larger memory capacities and the use of bank switching. This technique involved storing additional data in RAM and dynamically accessing it as needed, thereby significantly expanding gameplay possibilities. At Gunpei Yokoi's suggestion, a cartridge eject lever was also added, not for functionality, but to amuse children.

The Famicom design team initially considered arcade-style joysticks, and even dismantled existing models from American consoles, but ultimately rejected them due to concerns about durability and the risk of children stepping on them. Instead, they adopted the D-pad and two action button layout developed by R&D1 for their handheld Game & Watch series. As an early prototype, Katsuya Nakagawa attached a Game & Watch D-pad to the Famicom and found it comfortable and easy to use. To reduce costs, the controllers were hardwired to the console and stored in molded pockets on the case. A 15-pin expansion port was added to the front of the console so that an optional arcade-style joystick could be used. The second controller also included a microphone, which Uemura envisioned being used to make players' voices come through the TV speaker.

=== Japanese launch ===
On July 15, 1983, the console was released in Japan as the Home Cassette Type Video Game: Family Computer, (Note: Japanese: 家庭用カセット式ビデオゲーム ファミリーコンピュータ, Hepburn: Katei-yō Kasetto-Shiki Bideo Gēmu: Famirī Konpyūta) priced at ¥14,800 (¥20,718 in 2025) with three launch games, all of which were ports of popular Nintendo arcade games: Donkey Kong (1981), Donkey Kong Jr. (1982), and Popeye (1982). Although it was priced higher than originally intended, the Famicom remained less than half the cost of rival consoles. Backed by a robust marketing campaign, 500,000 units were sold within the first two months. However, a major fault emerged ahead of the critical Japanese New Year season, as reports began surfacing of consoles crashing during gameplay. Uemura and engineer Gunpei Yokoi traced the issue to a defective integrated circuit that could lock under specific data conditions. Upon reporting the issue to Yamauchi, staff proposed selectively replacing affected units. However, they were warned that a partial response could damage consumer trust and jeopardize Nintendo's first-mover advantage before competitors could respond. Yamauchi considered their input, then issued a decisive directive: "Recall them all."

After a product recall and the release of a revised model with a new motherboard, the system's popularity soared. By the end of 1984, the Famicom had become the best-selling game console in Japan in what came to be called the "Famicom Boom". Following the sale of the first million units, demand showed no signs of slowing. Japanese retailers inundated Nintendo with urgent requests for stock. Anticipation for new game releases reached record levels, which resulted in long queues and games selling out instantly. This phenomenon, soon dubbed "Nintendomania", overwhelmed the supply chain and further increased demand. The Famicom's success quickly cleared the field of competition in Japan. Fourteen rival console manufacturers exited the market, and Sega's SG-1000, launched in Japan on the same day as the Famicom, failed to gain traction.

At launch, Nintendo released only first-party games for the Famicom. However, in 1984, after being approached by Namco and Hudson Soft, the company agreed to allow third-party titles. Developers paid a 30% fee to cover console licensing and production costs, a revenue model that would later influence the video game industry for decades.

=== North American launch ===
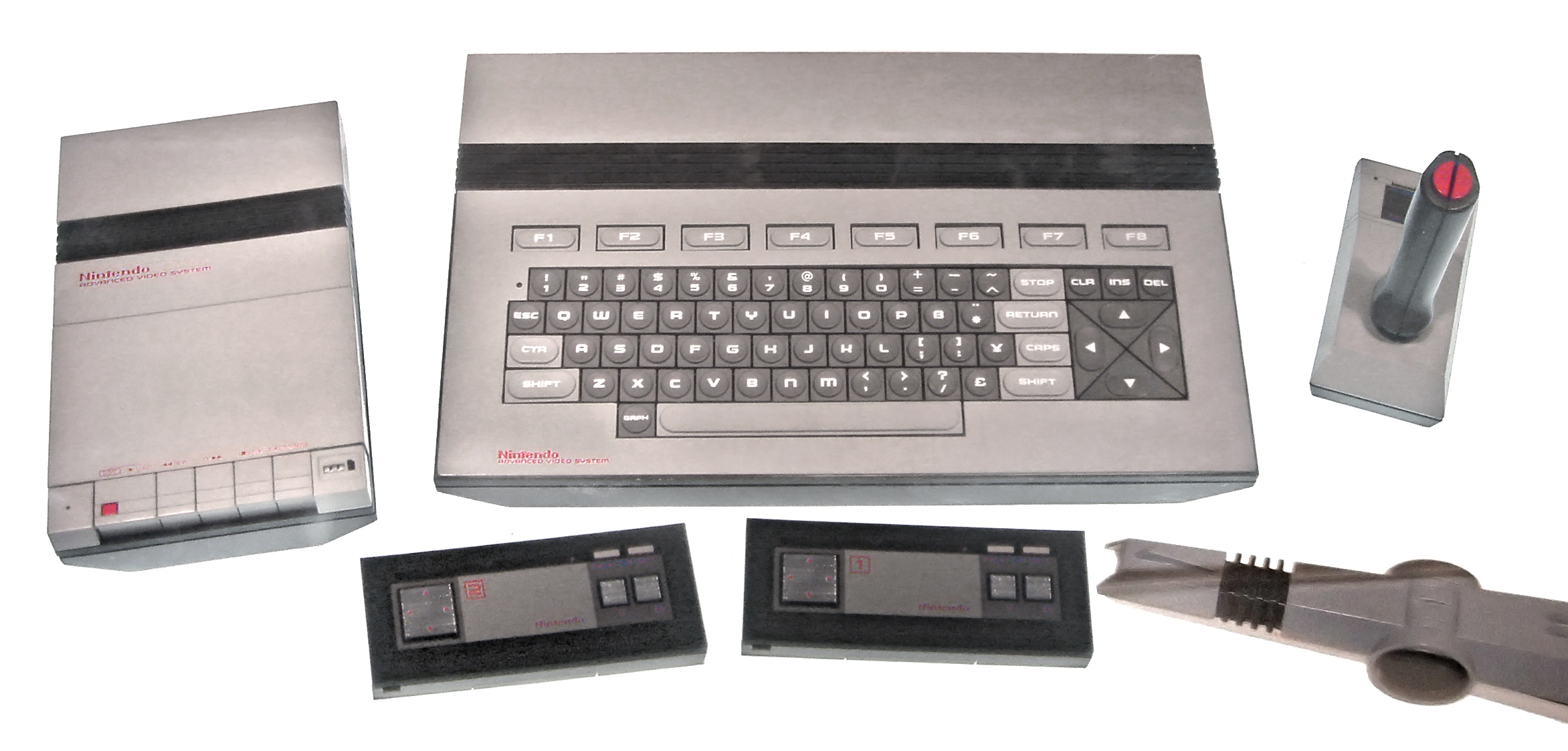
The prototype Advanced Video System, with cassette data drive and wireless accessories

Nintendo initially planned for the console to enter the North American market through a distribution agreement with Atari. The agreement was expected to be finalized at the Summer Consumer Electronics Show (CES) in June 1983. However, during the show, Atari discovered that Coleco was demonstrating an unlicensed port of Nintendo's Donkey Kong on its Adam computer system. Atari, believing this violated its exclusive license for the game, delayed the deal. Shortly afterward, Atari CEO Ray Kassar was fired, the deal fell apart, and Nintendo decided to market its system on its own.

Nintendo believed that the Famicom name might not resonate with American consumers, and initially rebranded the console as the Advanced Video System (AVS). The AVS resembled a home computer rather than a "toy", featuring a built-in keyboard, a cassette-based data drive, and infrared wireless controllers. By positioning the console as a more "sophisticated" consumer electronics product, Nintendo aimed to distance itself from the recent failures of companies such as Atari, Coleco, and Mattel. The AVS was publicly demonstrated at the Winter CES in January 1985, but the reaction was lukewarm. While the hardware and games were praised, there was deep skepticism that the console could succeed in the United States, as the industry there was still recovering from the video game crash of 1983. Electronic Games magazine reported in March 1985 that the video game market in America "[had] virtually disappeared", and believed "[it] could be a miscalculation on Nintendo's part".

With American retailers still wary of stocking game consoles after the 1983 crash, Yamauchi saw an opportunity to introduce the Famicom's hardware to North America through arcades. In 1984, Nintendo launched the VS. System, an arcade conversion system that featured ports of select Famicom games, with a focus on two-player competitive play. The VS. System became a major success, selling nearly 100,000 cabinets and becoming the highest-grossing arcade machine of 1985 in the United States. This success gave Nintendo the confidence to pursue a home console launch in North America, and provided a platform to test new titles to help shape the launch line-up.

Nintendo's display at a FAO Schwarz in New York City, 1986

Nintendo of America designers Lance Barr and Don James were disappointed with the prototype console they received from Japan, which they nicknamed "the lunchbox". For the console's western redesign, they added a two-tone gray color scheme with a black stripe and red lettering, as well as a front-loading, zero insertion force slot modeled after a videocassette recorder which concealed the game cartridge once inserted. The redesigned console, now called the Nintendo Entertainment System (NES), was unveiled by Nintendo at the June 1985 Summer CES, and dropped the home computer features of the earlier AVS prototype while retaining its gray color scheme and boxy form factor. It also replaced the Famicom's hardwired controllers and the AVS's wireless ones with detachable wired controllers using proprietary 7-pin connectors. To avoid the language used by earlier game consoles, marketing manager Gail Tilden coined alternative terms for the NES's hardware, calling the cartridges "Game Paks" and the console itself the "Control Deck", which would later aid its acceptance in toy stores. To further distance the NES from previous consoles, Nintendo heavily promoted optional accessories, such as the Zapper light gun and the Robotic Operating Buddy (R.O.B.), to position the system as cutting-edge and sophisticated. While initial consumer interest in the console was limited, its peripherals drew significant attention.

The NES launched in a limited test market in New York City on October 18, 1985, followed by Los Angeles in February 1986, and finally a full North American release on September 27, 1986. The launch line-up included 17 games: 10-Yard Fight, Baseball, Clu Clu Land, Duck Hunt, Excitebike, Golf, Gyromite, Hogan's Alley, Ice Climber, Kung Fu, Pinball, Soccer, Stack-Up, Super Mario Bros., Tennis, Wild Gunman, and Wrecking Crew. (Note: Donkey Kong Jr. Math and Mach Rider are often erroneously listed as launch games. Neither was available until later in 1986. Also, some modern sources question if Super Mario Bros. was available on launch day, though contemporaneous sources such as Computer Entertainer and The Milwaukee Journal state that the system launched with 17 titles, and the Journal references Super Mario Bros. by name.) Nintendo contracted with toy company Worlds of Wonder (WoW) to get the NES distributed in stores. WoW's aggressive sales tactics, which included requiring retailers to carry the NES in order to sell WoW's other popular toys, helped secure shelf space for the console. WoW salesman Jim Whims distinctly recalled delivering an ultimatum: "if you want to sell Teddy Ruxpin and you want to sell Lazer Tag, you're gonna sell Nintendo as well." WoW's efforts led to a successful first year for the NES; afterwards, Nintendo of America ended the distribution deal and hired WoW's sales team, taking over distribution directly. By the end of 1986, over a million units had been sold in the United States, nearly ten times the amount sold by both its competitors, the Atari 7800 and Master System.

With the launch of the NES, Nintendo redefined the home video game market in North America. The 1983 crash had been fueled by misleading marketing, lack of quality control, and hardware fragmentation. In contrast, Nintendo introduced strict standards for software approval, packaging, and quality. It used consistent branding with genre icons, box art that reflected in-game graphics, and the "Official Nintendo Seal of Quality". To enforce its standards, the company used the 10NES lock-out chip to deter production of unlicensed games.

=== Other markets ===
In Europe and Oceania, the NES was released in two marketing regions. The first consisted of mainland Europe (excluding Italy), where distribution was handled by several different companies, with Nintendo responsible for manufacturing. The NES was launched in Europe in early 1986, although it was released in most European countries in 1987. In Scandinavia, it was released on September 1, 1986, and was distributed by Bergsala. In the Netherlands, it was released in the last quarter of 1987, and was distributed by Bandai BV. In France, it was released in October 1987, and in Spain most likely in 1988 through distributor Spaco. In 1987, Mattel handled distribution for the second region, consisting of the United Kingdom, Ireland, Italy, Australia and New Zealand. In other European countries, distribution was handled by smaller companies, such as Bienengräber in Germany, ASD in France, Concentra in Portugal, Itochu in Greece and Cyprus, and Stadlbauer in Austria, Switzerland, and the former Eastern Bloc. In Poland, the NES was released on October 6, 1994, along with the SNES and the Game Boy. In November 1994, Nintendo signed an agreement with Steepler to permit the continued sale of the Dendy, an unauthorized hardware clone of the Famicom, in Russia in exchange for also distributing the SNES.

Nintendo anticipated that the NES would have a 25 percent market share in Europe, and saw particular potential in the United Kingdom. The console struggled to gain a foothold in the region, however, in part due to the widespread popularity of the ZX Spectrum, which had already established a strong home computing and gaming culture. The affordability, local software support, and versatility of the Spectrum also made it a dominant choice among British consumers, which severely limited the NES's market penetration. The console would see an increase in share in 1990 with the release of the Teenage Mutant Hero Turtles bundle, which was released against Nintendo of America's wishes but ultimately allowed the console's European sales to overtake those of the Master System.

In most of the coutries of Latin America, the distribution was took over by Itochu Corp. (also known as C. Itoh & Co.) with trial sales took place in Mexico and after success expanded to next countries including Venezuela, Colombia, Ecuador, Chile, Peru, Argentina, Bolivia, Uruguay, Suriname, Guyana, Caribbean and Central America. Miami-based company called Game Latin, Inc. (later renamed Gamela) was responsible for purchasing consoles, subsidizing marketing and assemble Nintendo products in Mexico. Unfortunately this strategy couldn't be implemented in Brazil. Because of this, Itochu and Nintendo of America created a joint venture with local company Playtronic in late 1993. However, the Latin American and Brazilian markets had been dominated by unlicensed NES clones that were either locally made or smuggled from Taiwan. One of the most successful Brazilian NES clones was the Phantom System by Gradiente, which licensed Nintendo products in the country for the following decade. The sales of officially licensed products in the region were low due to the abundance of clones, the console's official launch coming after the SNES, and the high prices of Nintendo's licensed products.

Outside of Japan, regions of Bangladesh, Indonesia, Malaysia, Nepal, Pakistan, Singapore, Sri Lanka and Thailand received an "Asian version" of the front-loader NES, although imported Famicom systems were still prevalent. Due to import restrictions, NES consoles in India and South Korea were rebranded and distributed by local licenses. The Korean version is known as the Hyundai Comboy, and the Indian version is known as the Samurai Electronic TV Game System. (Note: Korean: 현대 컴보이; RR: Hyeondae Keomboi) India was the third region outside of North America and Japan to officially receive the NES. It was produced locally by Samurai Electronics in North India, and was released to strong initial sales in the region, selling 3,000 units per month. However, in the early 1990s, when retailers began promoting bootleg consoles, the console saw a significant drop in sales, selling 300 units per month.

=== Bundles and redesigns ===
The NES was released in several retail bundles throughout its commercial life. For its 1985 American test launch, the initial offering was the Deluxe Set, which retailed for US$179.99 (equivalent to $540 in 2025) and included the Control Deck, two controllers, the NES Zapper light gun, the R.O.B. robotic accessory, and two Game Paks: Gyromite and Duck Hunt. Ahead of the console's nationwide launch in 1986, Nintendo introduced a basic Control Deck set with two controllers, bundled with Super Mario Bros. for US$99.99 (equivalent to $280 in 2025).

In 1988, the Deluxe Set was replaced by the Action Set, which retailed for US$99.99 (equivalent to $270 in 2025) and bundled the Control Deck with two controllers, the NES Zapper, and a dual Game Pak containing Super Mario Bros. and Duck Hunt. 1988 also saw the introduction of the Power Set, which added the Power Pad floor mat game controller and replaced the dual cartridge with a triple Game Pak featuring Super Mario Bros., Duck Hunt, and World Class Track Meet.

In 1990, Nintendo released the Sports Set, which included the Control Deck, four controllers, an NES Satellite infrared wireless multitap adapter, and a dual Game Pak containing Super Spike V'Ball and Nintendo World Cup. In 1992, the Challenge Set debuted at US$89.99 (equivalent to $210 in 2025), featuring the Control Deck and two controllers, bundled with Super Mario Bros. 3.

Finally, in October 1993, Nintendo released a redesigned version of the console, known as the New-Style NES or NES-101, in North America, Australia, and Japan. This version included a single redesigned "dogbone" shape controller, and retailed for US$49.99 (equivalent to $110 in 2025) in North America before its discontinuation in 1995. In Australia, the console was bundled with a triple Game Pak featuring Super Mario Bros., Tetris, and Nintendo World Cup, and sold for A$79.99, or A$69.99 without the bundled Game Pak.

=== Discontinuation ===
On August 14, 1995, Nintendo discontinued the Nintendo Entertainment System in both North America and Europe. In North America, replacements for the original front-loading NES were available for $25 in exchange for a broken system until at least December 1996, under Nintendo's Power Swap program.

In September 2003, Nintendo discontinued the Famicom in Japan, alongside the Super Famicom and disk rewriting services for the Famicom Disk System. The last Famicom model, serial number HN11033309, was manufactured on September 25, 2003; it was kept by Nintendo and subsequently loaned to the organizers of Level X, a video game exhibition held from December 4, 2003, to February 8, 2004, at the Tokyo Metropolitan Museum of Photography, for a Famicom retrospective in commemoration of the console's 20th anniversary. Nintendo offered repair services for the Famicom in Japan until 2007, when it was discontinued due to a shortage of available parts.

== Hardware ==
=== Configurations ===
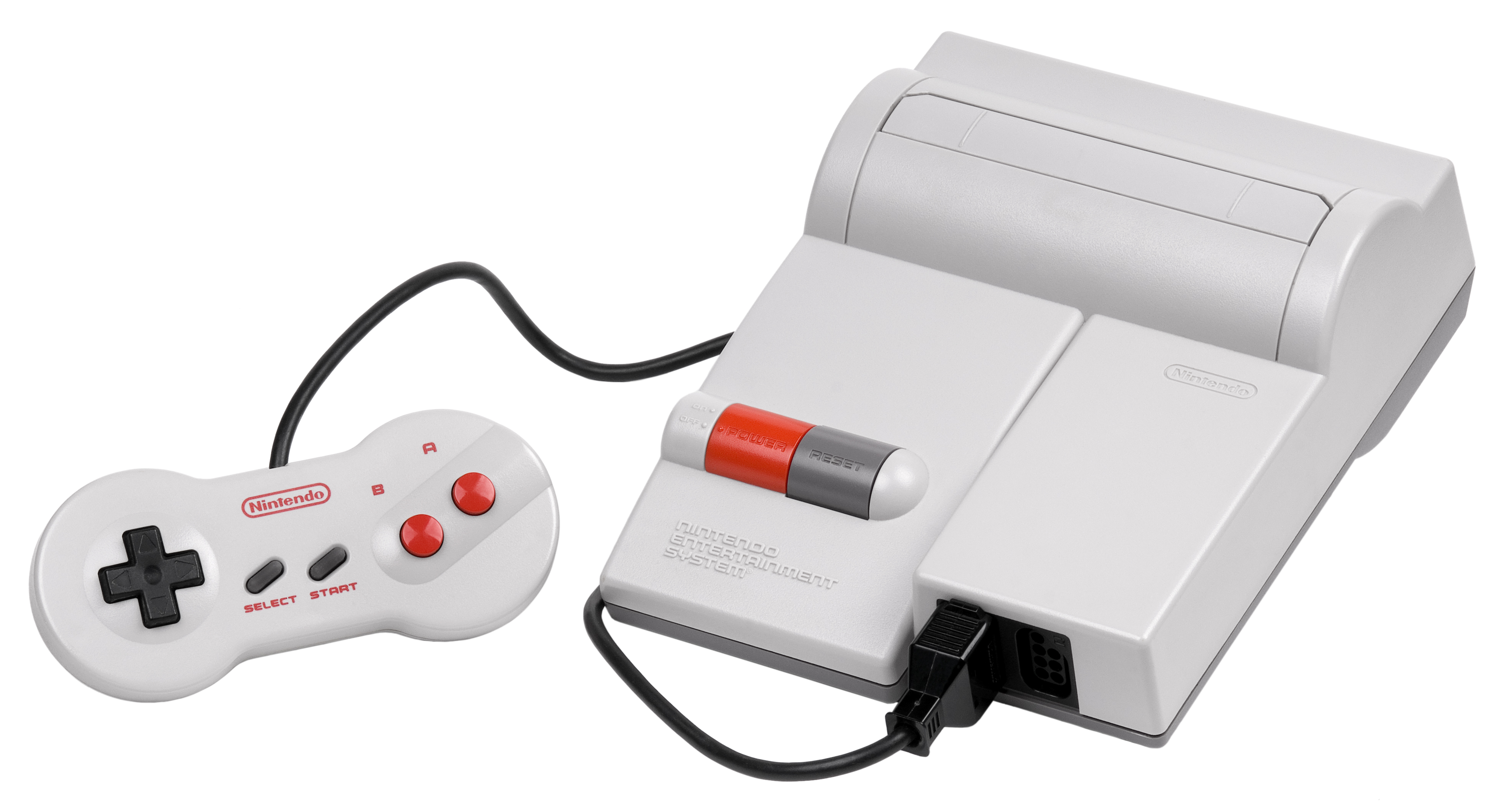
New-Style NES

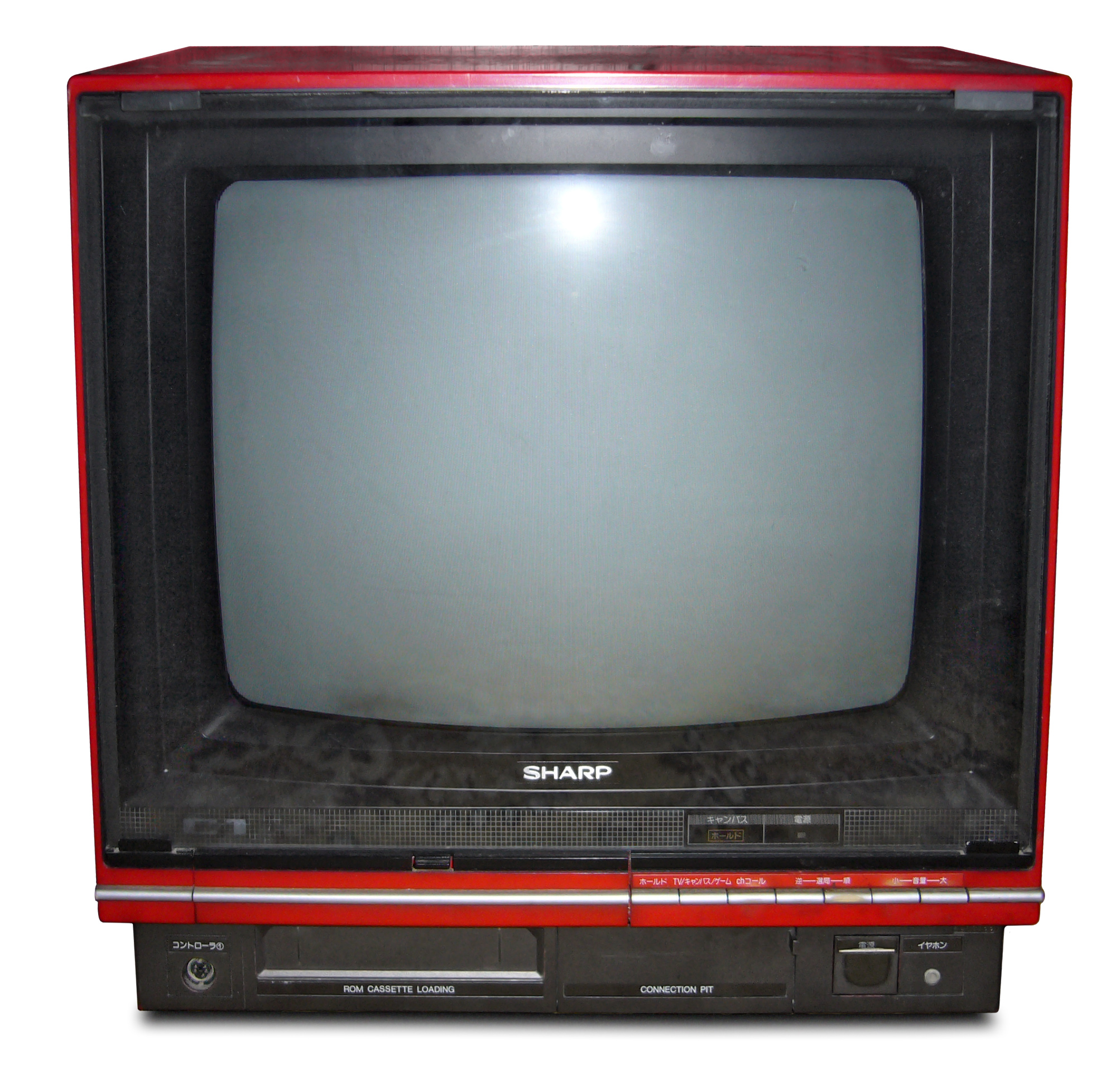
Sharp C1 Famicom TV (14-inch)

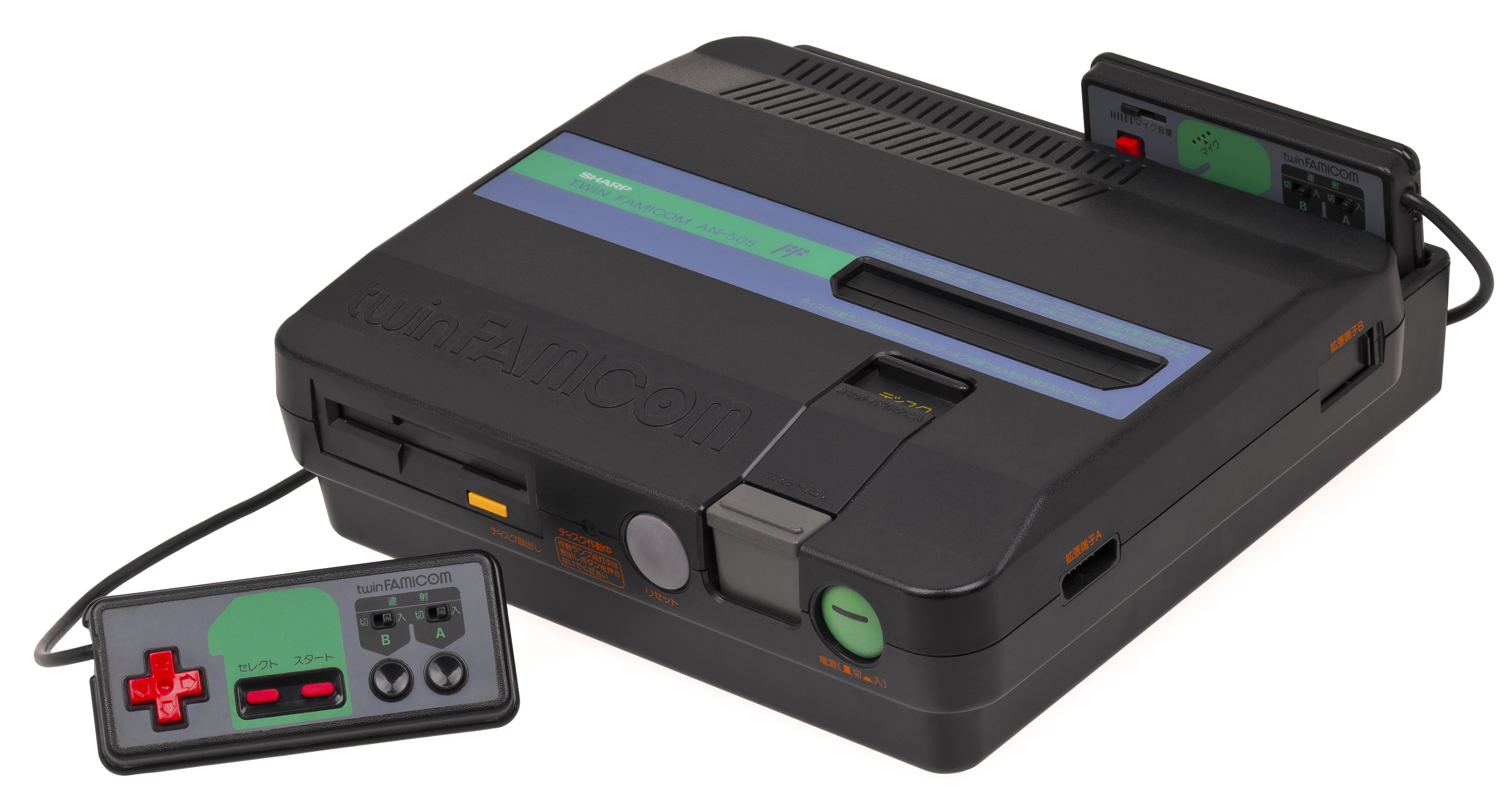
Twin Famicom

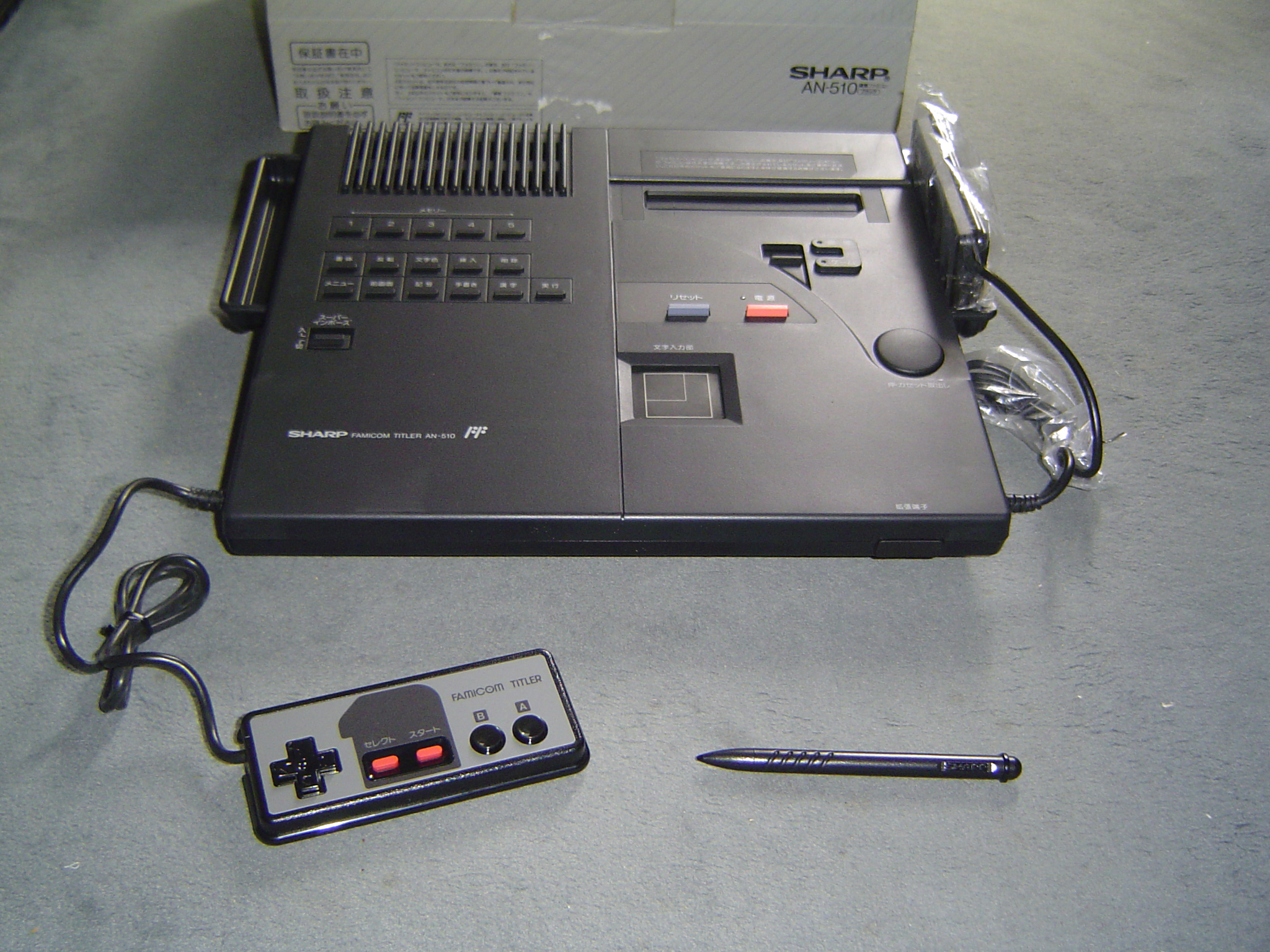
Famicom Titler

Although all versions of the Famicom and NES include essentially similar hardware, they vary in physical characteristics. The original Famicom's design is predominantly white plastic with a dark red trim; it featured a top-loading cartridge slot, grooves on both sides of the deck in which the hardwired game controllers could be placed when not in use, and a 15-pin expansion port located on the unit's front panel for accessories. In contrast, the design of the original NES features a more subdued gray, black, and red color scheme, with a front-loading cartridge slot covered by a small, hinged door that can be opened to insert or remove a cartridge and closed at other times, and an expansion port on the bottom of the unit. The NES also includes the 10NES lock-out chip, and incorporates a matching chip validation check in its cartridge connector.

In late 1993, Nintendo introduced a redesigned version of the Famicom and NES (known officially as the New Famicom in Japan and the New-Style NES in the US) to complement the Super Famicom and SNES, to prolong interest in the console, and to reduce costs. The redesigned NES features a top-loading cartridge slot and omits the 10NES lock-out chip to avoid reliability issues with the original console; the redesign also omits AV output. Conversely, the redesigned Famicom features AV output, and introduces detachable game controllers, which ultimately omitted microphone functionality as a result. The redesigned Famicom and NES models are cosmetically similar, aside from the presence of a cartridge "bump" on the NES model, which the Famicom model lacks to accommodate its shorter cartridges and the RAM Adapter for the Famicom Disk System.

Sharp Corporation produced three licensed variants of the Famicom in Japan, all of which prominently display the shortened moniker rather than the official name, Family Computer. One variant was a television set with an integrated Famicom; originally released in 1983 as the My Computer TV in 14-inch (36 cm) and 19-inch (48 cm) models, it was later released in the United States in 1989 as a 19-inch model named the Video Game Television. Another variant is the Twin Famicom console, which was released in 1986 and combines a Famicom with a Famicom Disk System. Sharp then produced the Famicom Titler in 1989; intended for video capture and production, it features internal RGB video generation and video output via S-Video, as well as inputs for adding subtitles and voice-overs.

==== Hardware clones ====
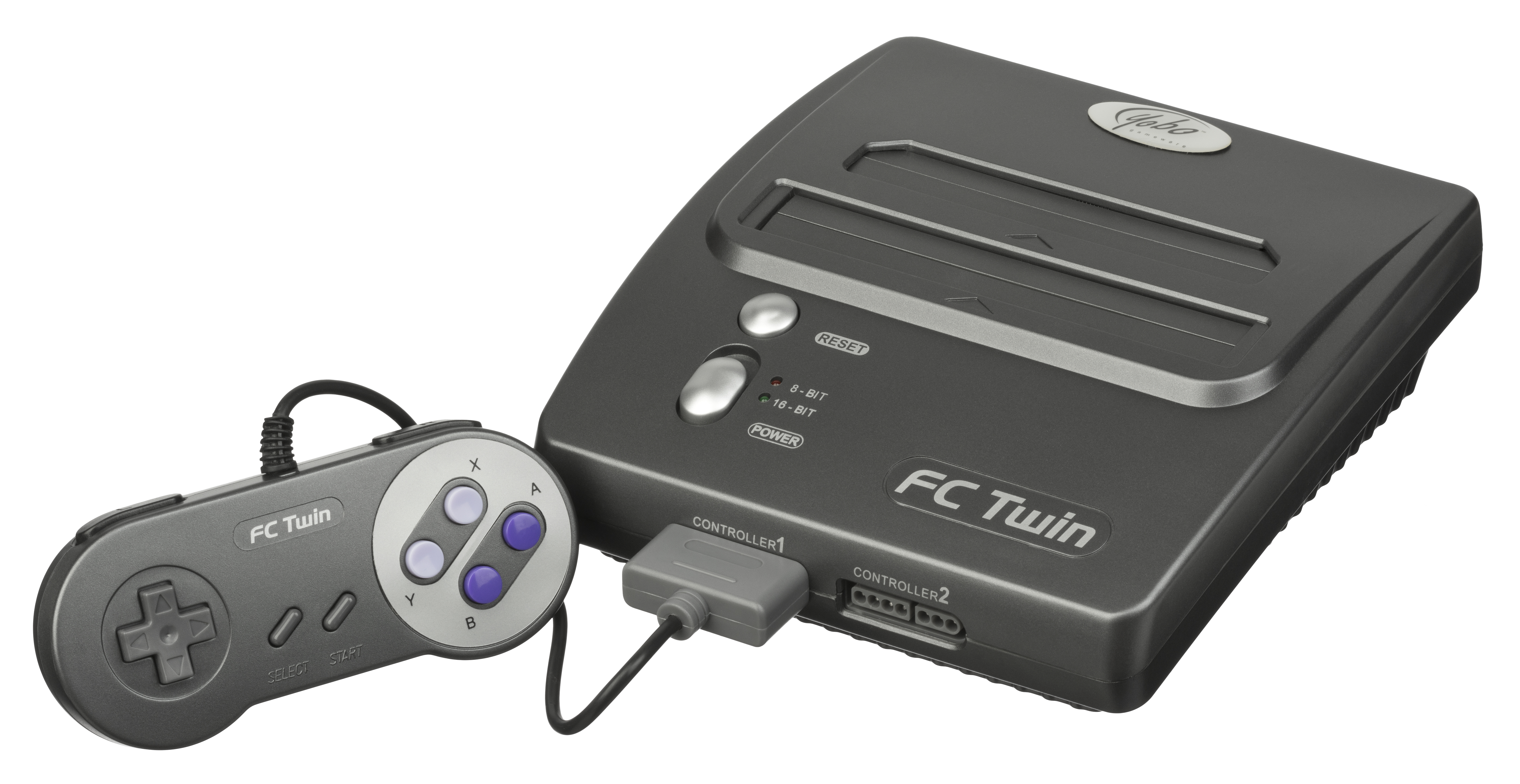
Pirated clones of NES hardware remained in production for many years after the original had been discontinued. Some clones play cartridges from multiple systems, such as this FC Twin that plays NES and SNES games.

A thriving market of unlicensed NES hardware clones emerged during the climax of the console's popularity. Initially, such clones were popular in markets with weak copyright laws and countries in which Nintendo issued its systems after "famiclones" became well-known, making legal products difficult to market or create brand awareness for. In particular, the Dendy (Russian: Де́нди), an unlicensed hardware clone produced in Taiwan and released in December 1992 in Russia by Steepler, emerged as the most popular console of its time, eventually selling six million units. In Poland, the Pegasus clone, distributed by Bobmark International, sold more than a million units. In China, a reported 30 million units were sold until late 1995. A range of Famicom clones was marketed in Latin America during the late 1980s and 1990s under the name "Family Game", resembling the original hardware design. The Ending-Man Terminator clone enjoyed popularity in the Eastern Bloc, as well as in parts of Africa, Asia, and Latin America.

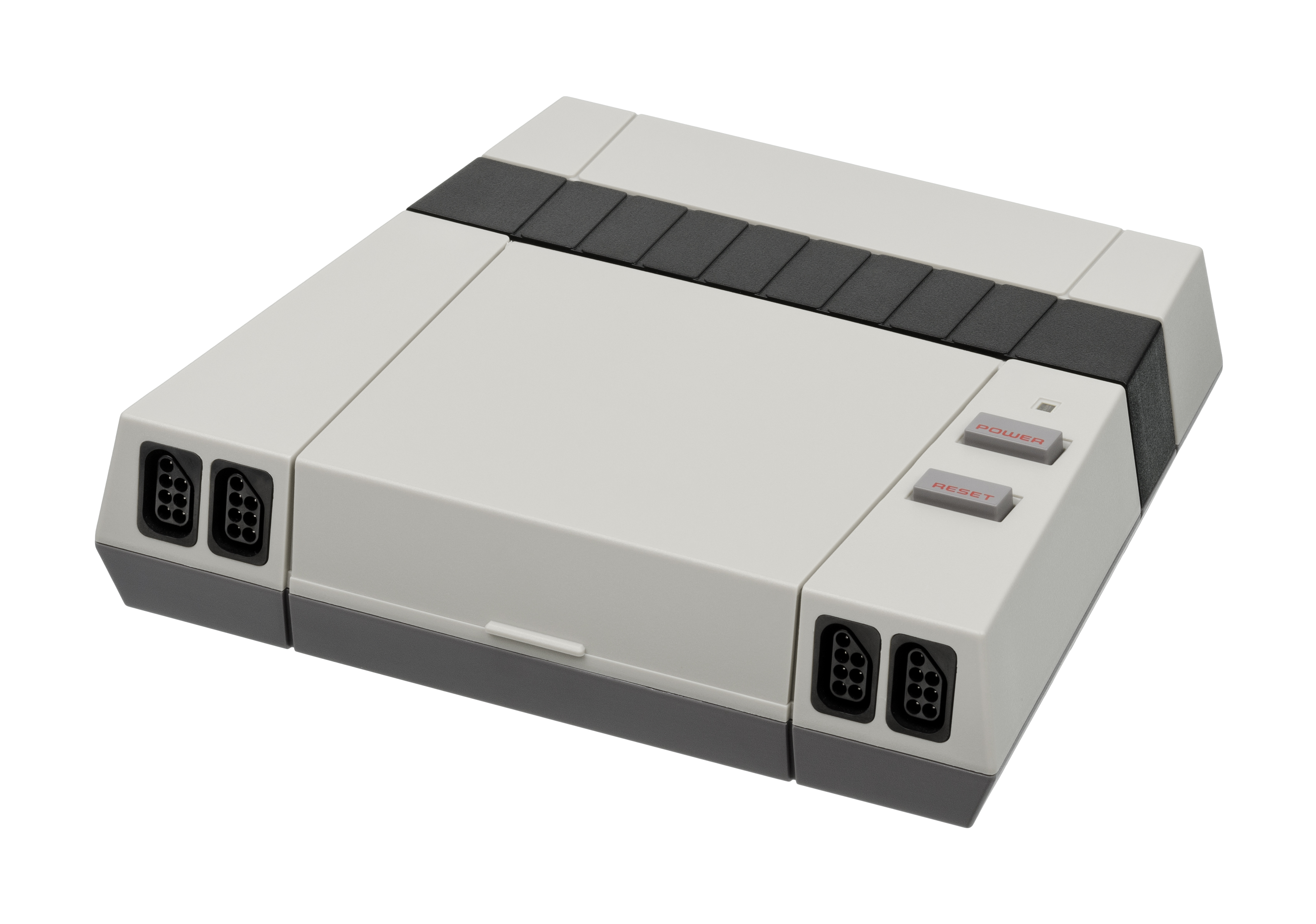
The RetroUSB AVS is an FPGA-based hardware clone of the NES that outputs 720p via HDMI.

The unlicensed clone market flourished following Nintendo's discontinuation of the NES. Some of these surpass the functionality of the original hardware, such as PocketFami, a portable system with a color LCD screen. Others have been produced for certain specialized markets, such as a personal computer with a keyboard and basic word processing software. These unauthorised clones have been helped by the invention of the so-called NES-on-a-chip.

=== Design flaws ===
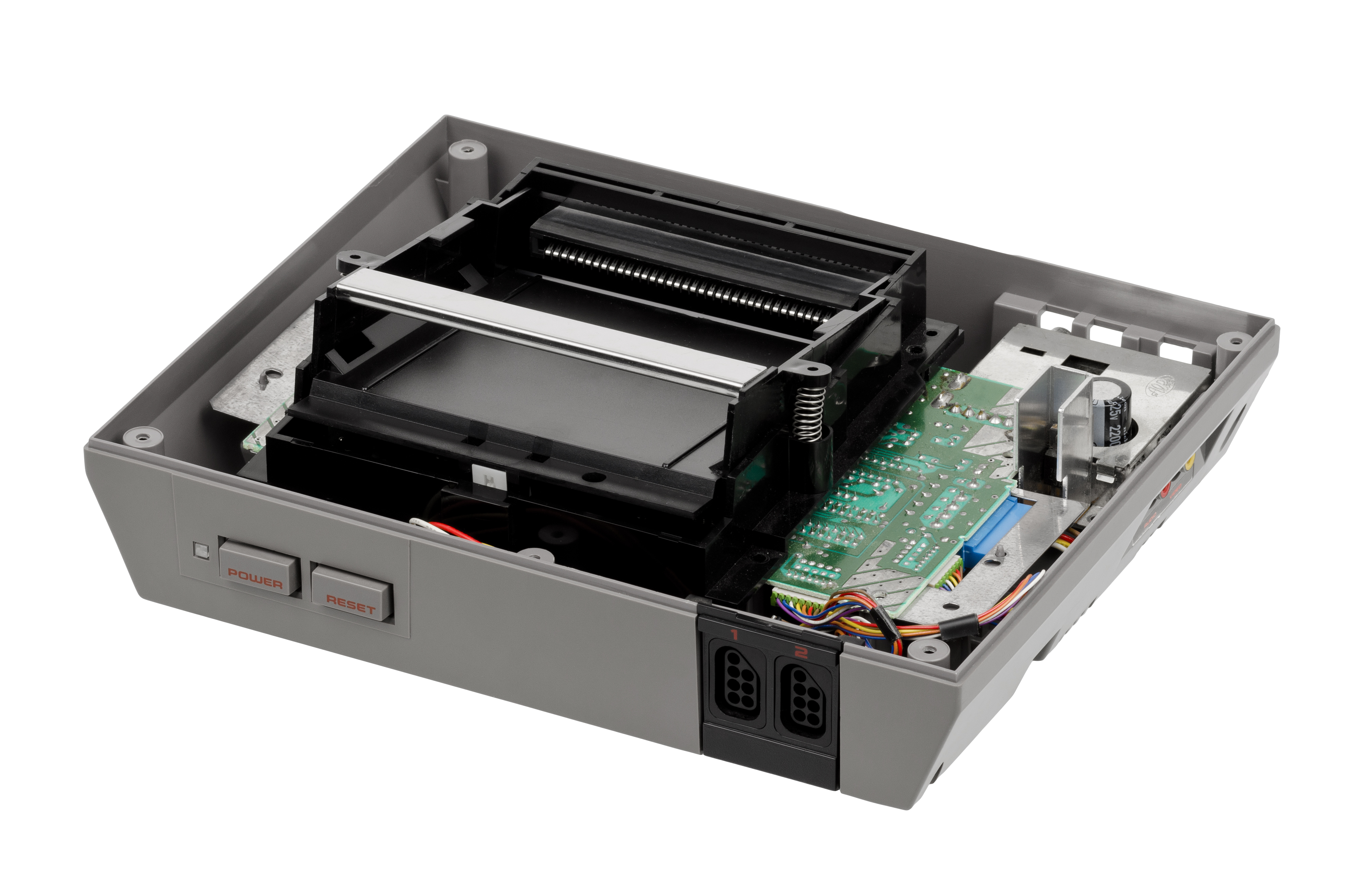
The VCR-like loading mechanism of the NES led to problems over time. The design wears connector pins out quickly, and they easily become dirty, resulting in difficulties with the NES reading Game Paks.

Nintendo's design styling for the NES's North American release was made deliberately different from that of other game consoles. The company wished to distinguish their product from those of competitors and avoid the generally poor reputation that game consoles had acquired following the video game crash of 1983. One result of this philosophy was to disguise the cartridge slot design as a front-loading zero-insertion force (ZIF) cartridge socket, designed to resemble the front-loading mechanism of a videocassette recorder. However, when a user inserts the cartridge, the force of pressing it into place bends the contact pins slightly and presses the cartridge's ROM board back into the cartridge. Frequent insertion and removal of cartridges can wear out the pins, and the ZIF design has proven to be more prone to interference by dirt and dust than an industry-standard card edge connector.

The design problems were exacerbated by Nintendo's choice of materials. The console slot nickel connector springs wear out due to their design, and the game cartridge's brass plated nickel connectors are also prone to tarnishing and oxidation. Nintendo sought to fix these problems by redesigning the next generation Super Nintendo Entertainment System (SNES) as a top loader similar to the Famicom. Many users reportedly tried to alleviate issues caused by corrosion by blowing into the cartridges and then reinserting them, which conversely sped up the tarnishing due to moisture.

=== Lockout ===
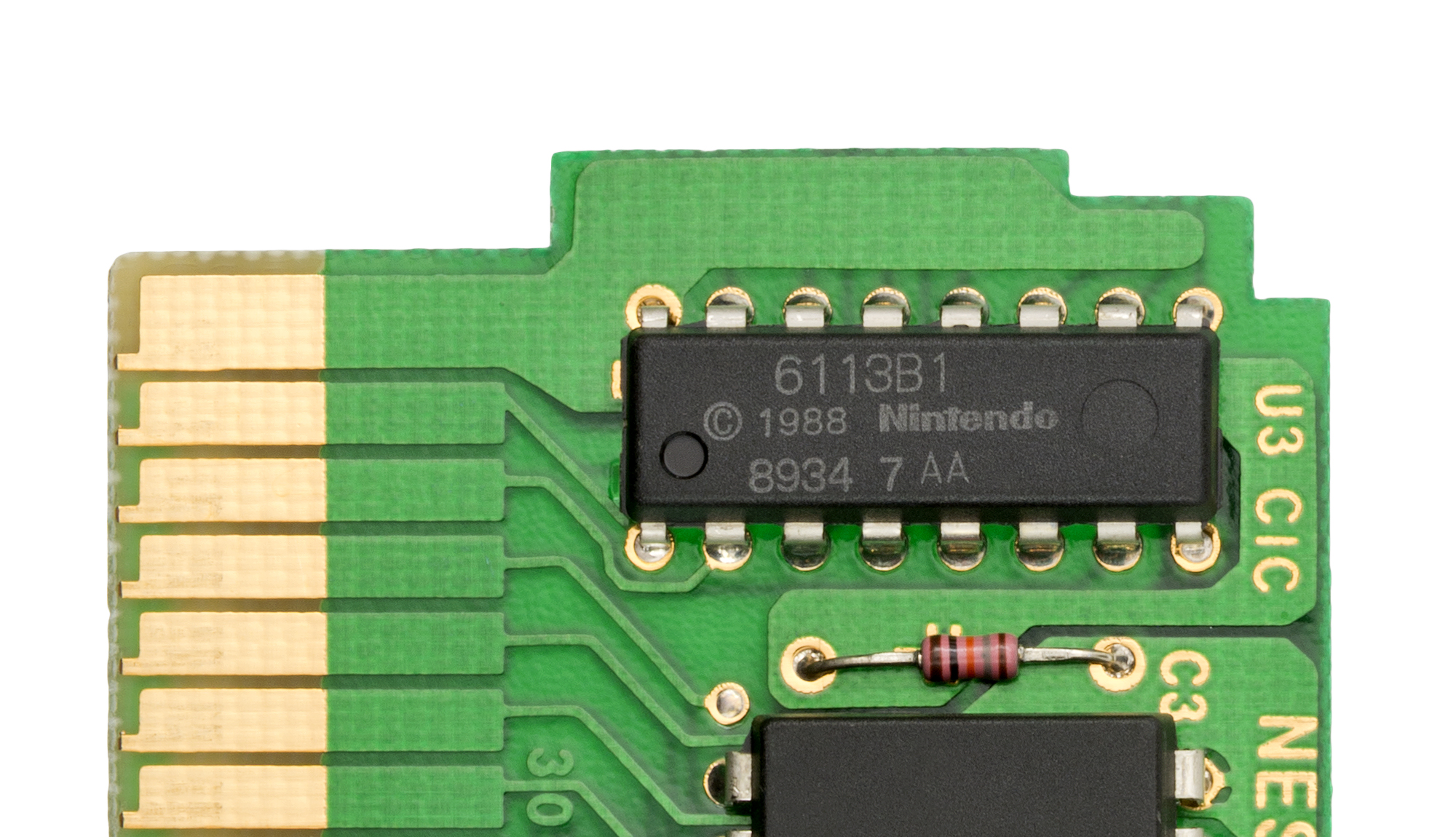
The 10NES authentication chip (top) contributes to the system's reliability problems. The circuit was ultimately removed from the remodeled New-Style NES.

The Famicom as released in Japan contains no lock-out hardware, which led to unlicensed cartridges (both legitimate and bootleg) becoming extremely common in Japan and East Asia. To combat bootlegs, Nintendo attempted to promote its "Seal of Quality" in these regions to identify licensed games, but bootleg Famicom games continued to be produced even after Nintendo moved production onto the Super Famicom, effectively extending the lifetime of the original Famicom.

The original NES, released for western countries in 1985, contains the 10NES lock-out chip, which prevents the console from running cartridges unapproved by Nintendo. The inclusion of the 10NES chip was a result of the 1983 North American video game crash, which was partially caused by a market flooded with uncontrolled publishing of poor-quality home console games. Nintendo sought to use the lock-out chip to restrict games to only those they licensed for the system. This means of protection worked in combination with Nintendo's "Seal of Quality", which a developer had to acquire before they would be able to have access to the required 10NES information prior to publication of a game.

Original NES consoles sold in different regions have different lock-out chips, thereby enforcing regional lock-out regardless of TV signal compatibility. Such regions include North America; most of continental Europe (PAL-B); Asia; and the British Isles, Italy, and Australasia (PAL-A).

Problems with the 10NES lock-out chip frequently result in one of the console's most common issues: the blinking, red power light, in which the system appears to turn itself on and off repeatedly because the 10NES would reset the console once per second. The lock-out chip requires constant communication with the chip in the game to work.

=== Technical specifications ===
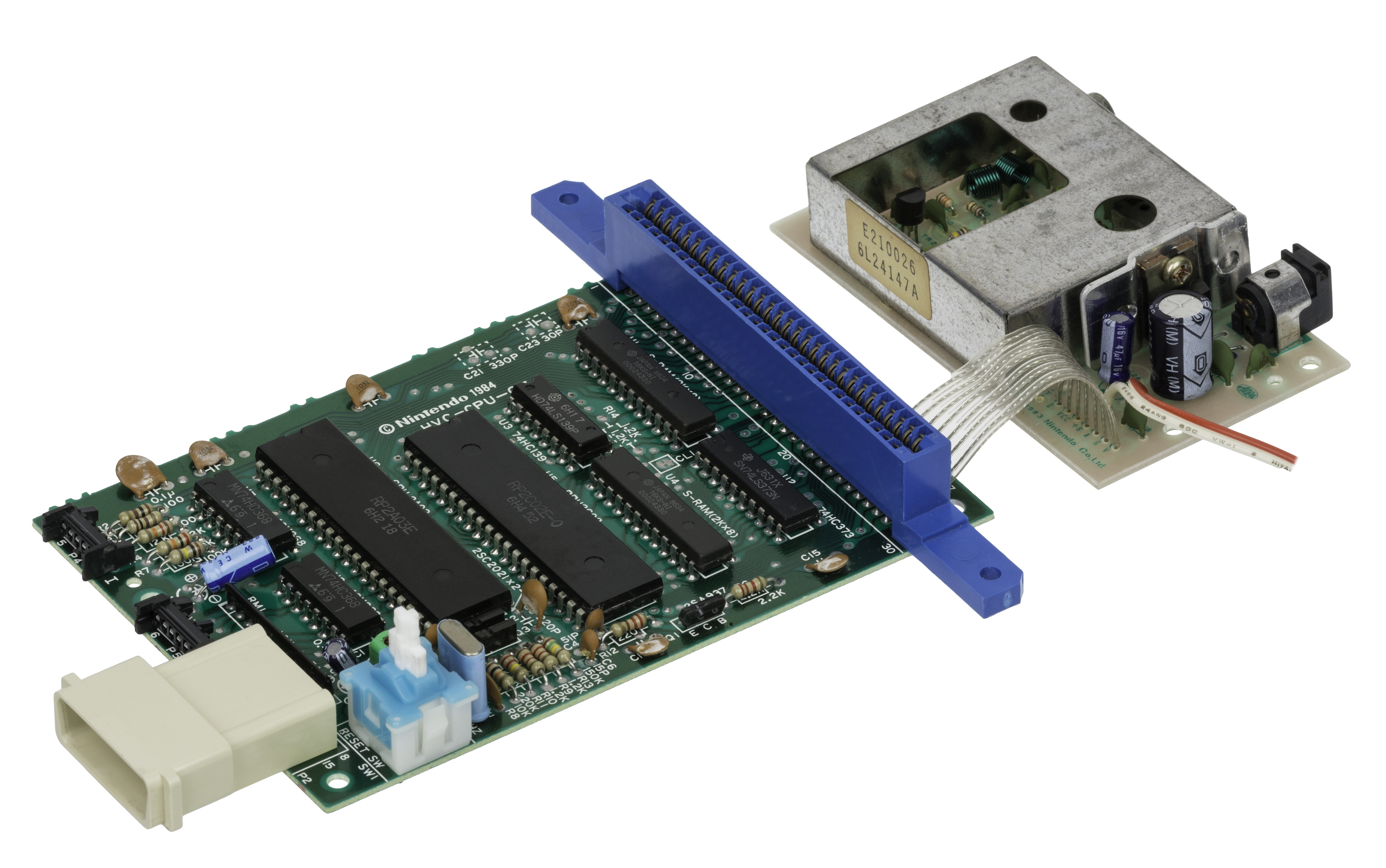
Famicom motherboard

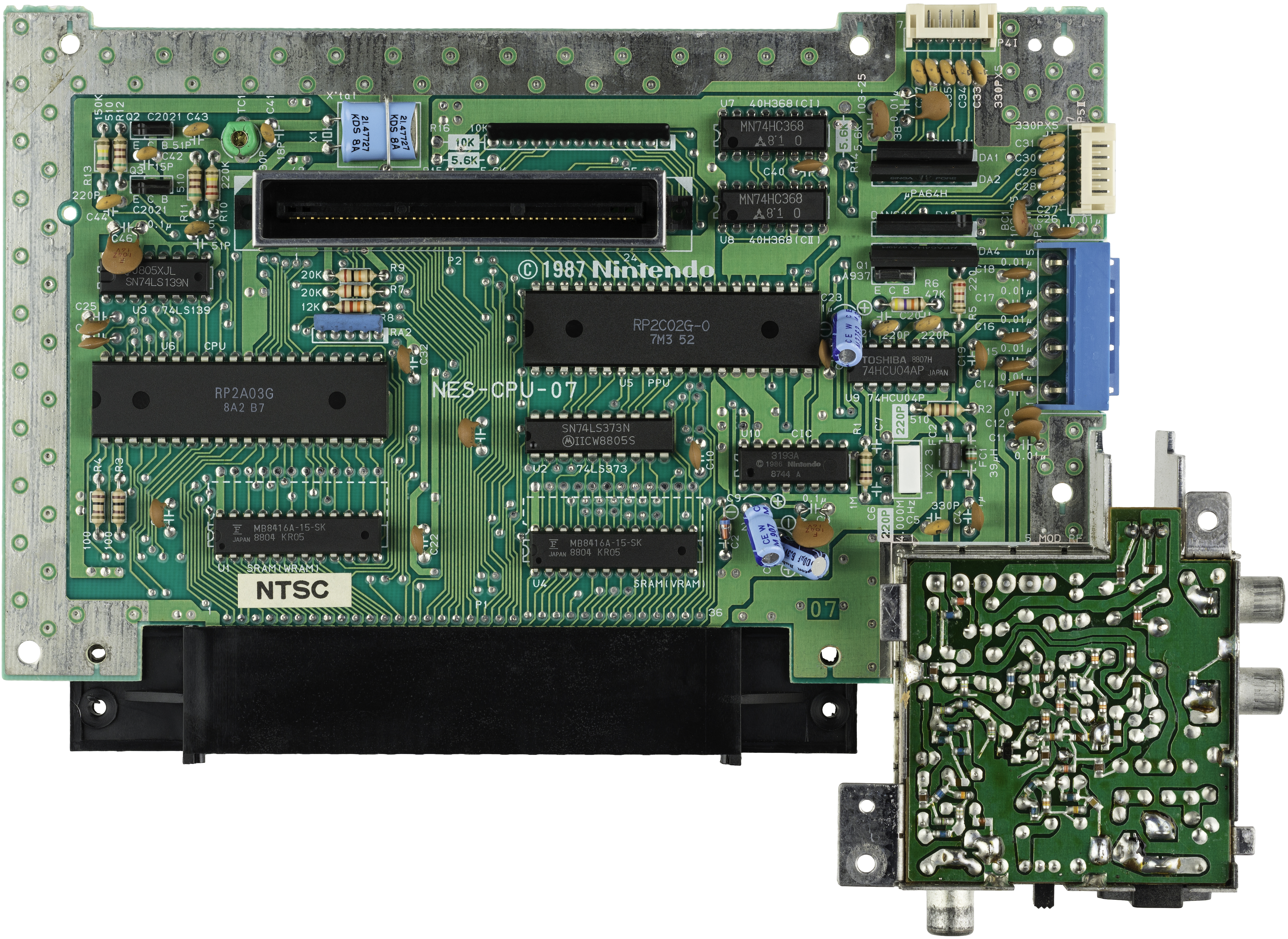
NTSC NES motherboard (annotated version)

PAL NES motherboard

The console's main central processing unit (CPU) was produced by Ricoh, which manufactured different versions for NTSC and PAL regions; NTSC consoles have a 2A03 clocked at 1.79 MHz, and PAL consoles have a 2A07 clocked at 1.66 MHz. Both CPUs are unlicensed variants of the MOS Technology 6502, an 8-bit microprocessor prevalent in contemporary home computers and consoles. Nintendo ostensibly disabled the 6502's binary-coded decimal mode on them to avoid patent infringement against or licensing fees towards MOS Technology, which was owned by then-rival Commodore International. The CPU has access to 2 KB of onboard work RAM.

The console's graphics are handled by a Ricoh 2C02, a processor known as the Picture Processing Unit (PPU) that is clocked at 5.37 MHz. A derivative of the Texas Instruments TMS9918 (a tile based video display controller used in the ColecoVision), the PPU features 2 KB of video RAM, 256 bytes of on-die "object attribute memory" (OAM) to store sprite display information on up to 64 sprites, and 28 bytes of RAM to store information on the YIQ-based color palette; the console can display up to 25 colors simultaneously out of 54 usable colors. Each sprite tile can display up to 3 palette colors at a time, with the first entry of each palette representing transparency.

The console's standard display resolution is 256 × 240 pixels, though video output options vary between models. The original Famicom features only radio frequency (RF) modulator output, and the NES additionally supports composite video via RCA connectors. (Note: French NES consoles include an AV port that outputs RGB video via a SCART connector; however, it is not true RGB video output as the PPU natively outputs composite video in consumer home console models.) The redesigned Famicom omits the RF modulator entirely, only outputting composite video via a proprietary "multi-out" connector first introduced on the Super Famicom/SNES; conversely, the redesigned NES features RF modulator output only, though a version of the model including the "multi-out" connector was produced in rare quantities.

The console produces sound via an audio processing unit (APU) integrated into the processor. It supports a total of five sound channels: two pulse wave channels, one triangle wave channel, one white noise channel, and one DPCM channel for sample playback. Audio playback speed is dependent on the CPU clock rate, which is set by a crystal oscillator.

=== Accessories ===
==== Controllers ====
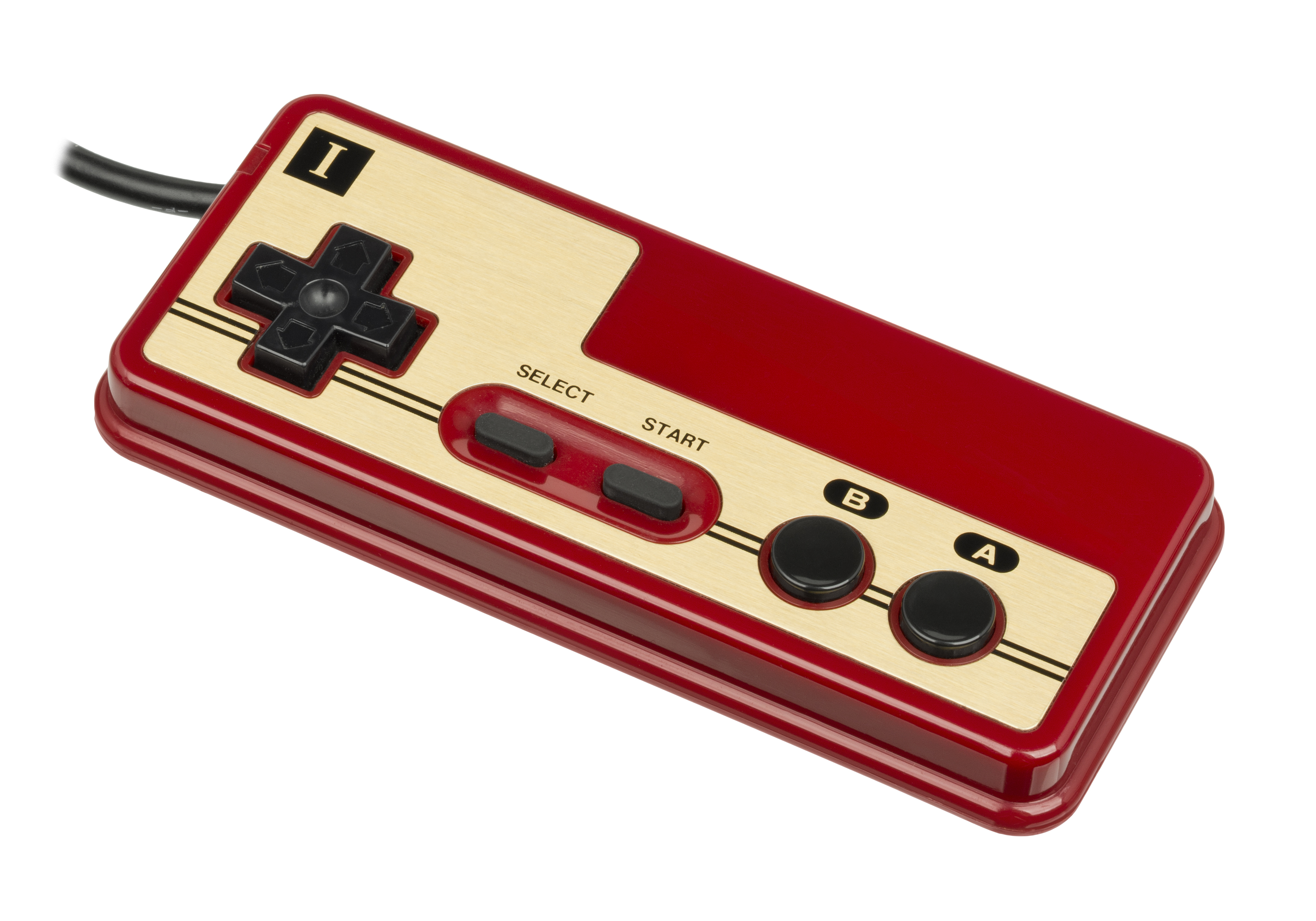
Original Famicom first player controller

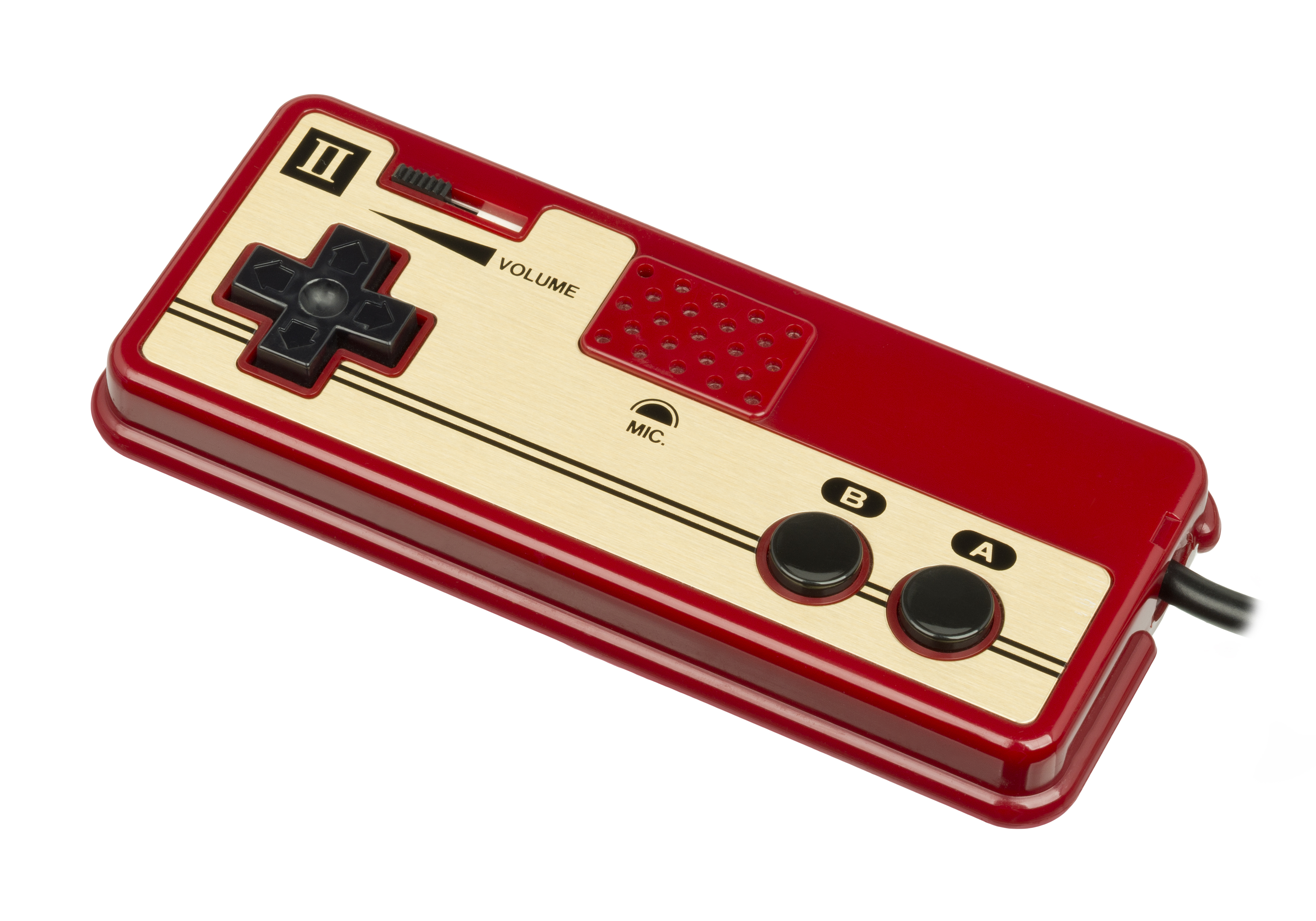
Original Famicom second player controller

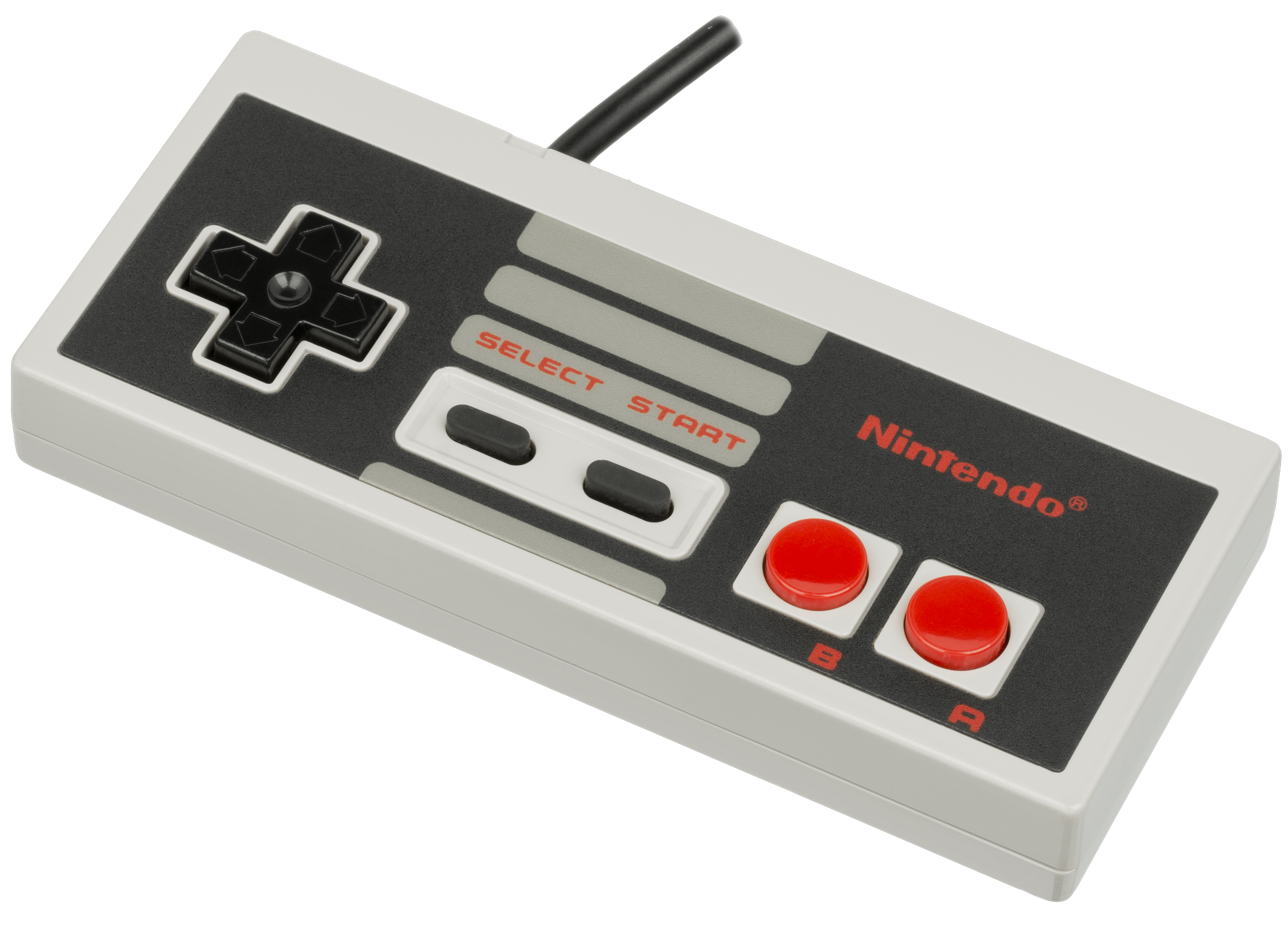
Original NES controller

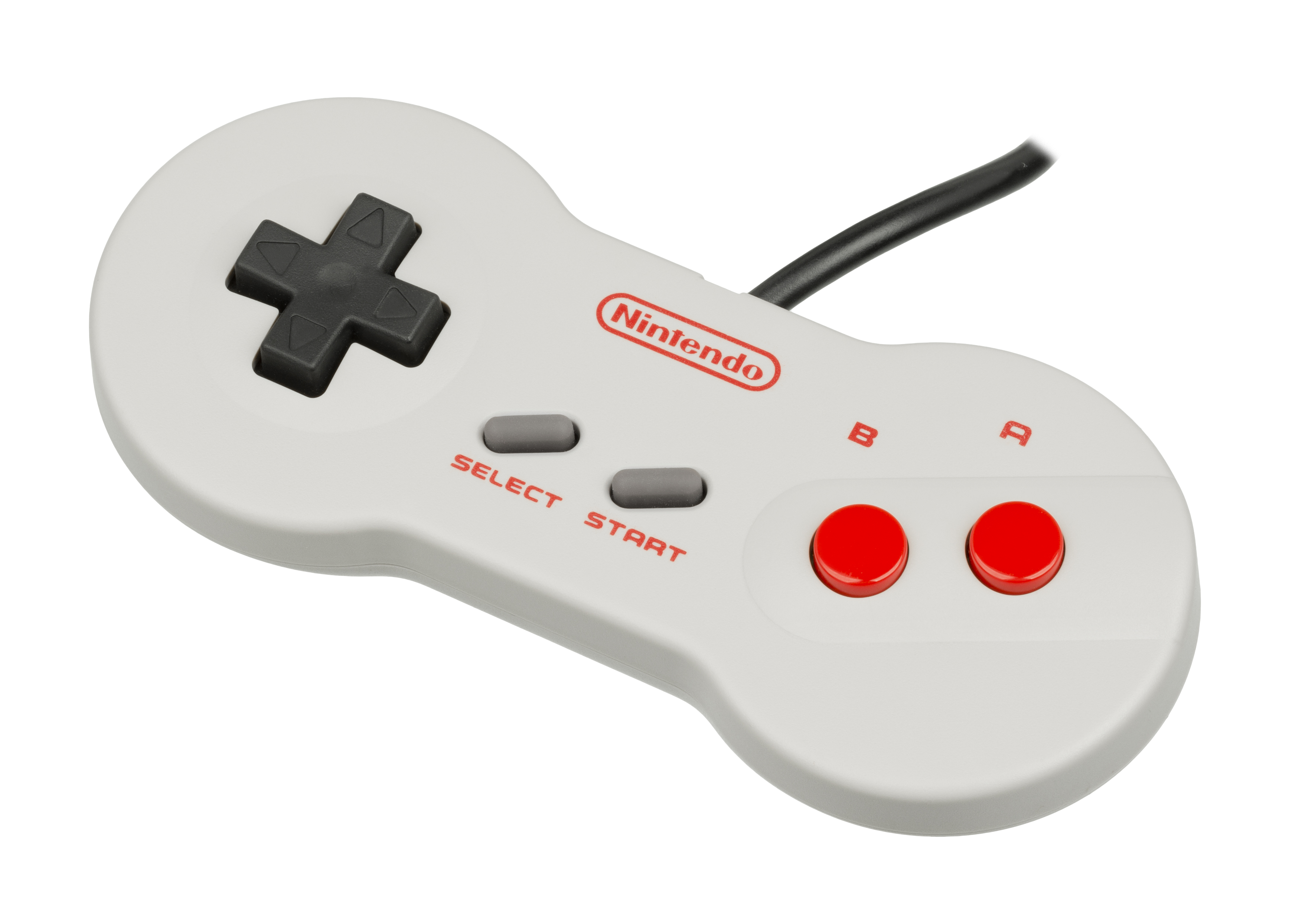
New-Style NES controller

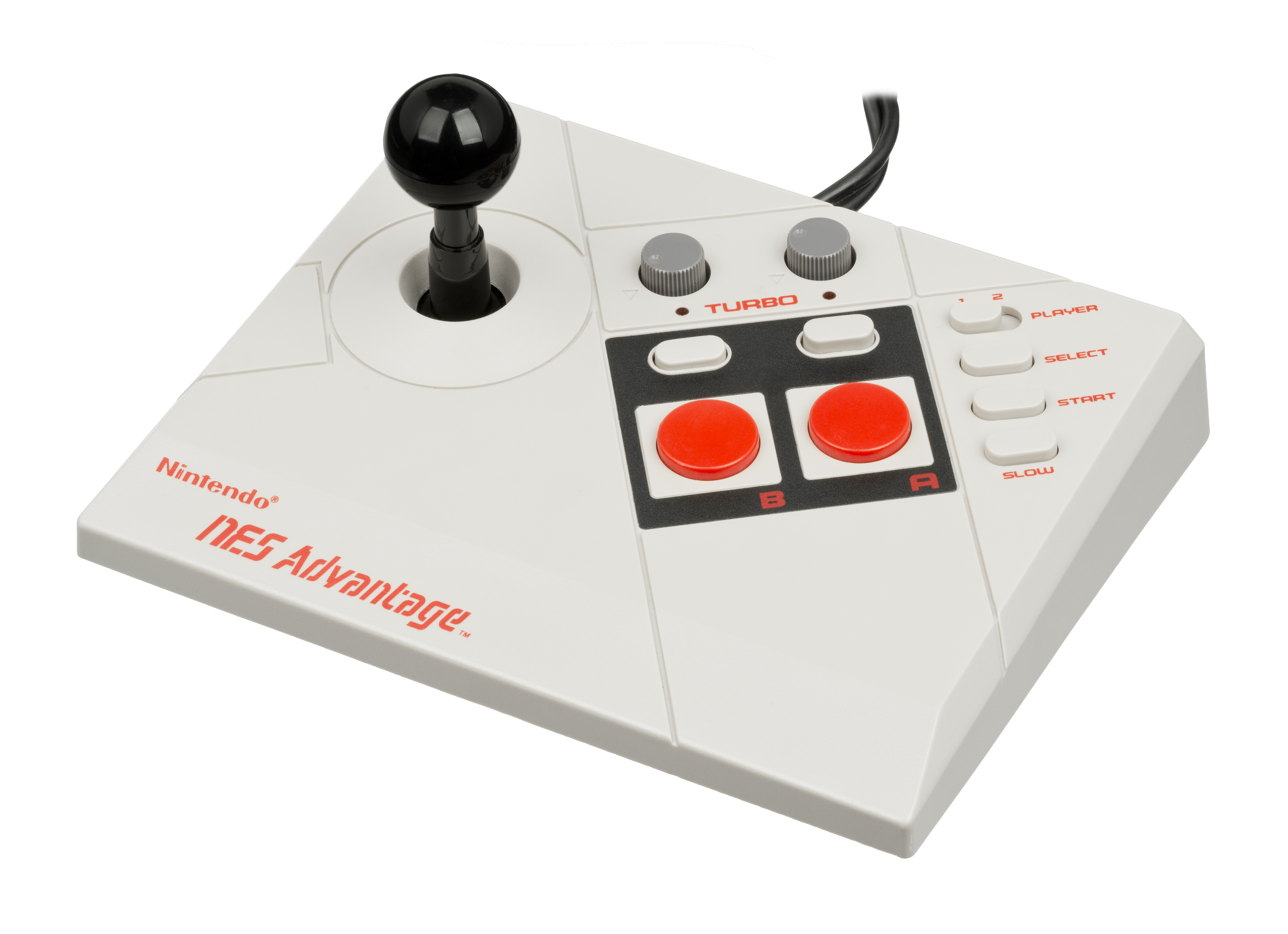
NES Advantage

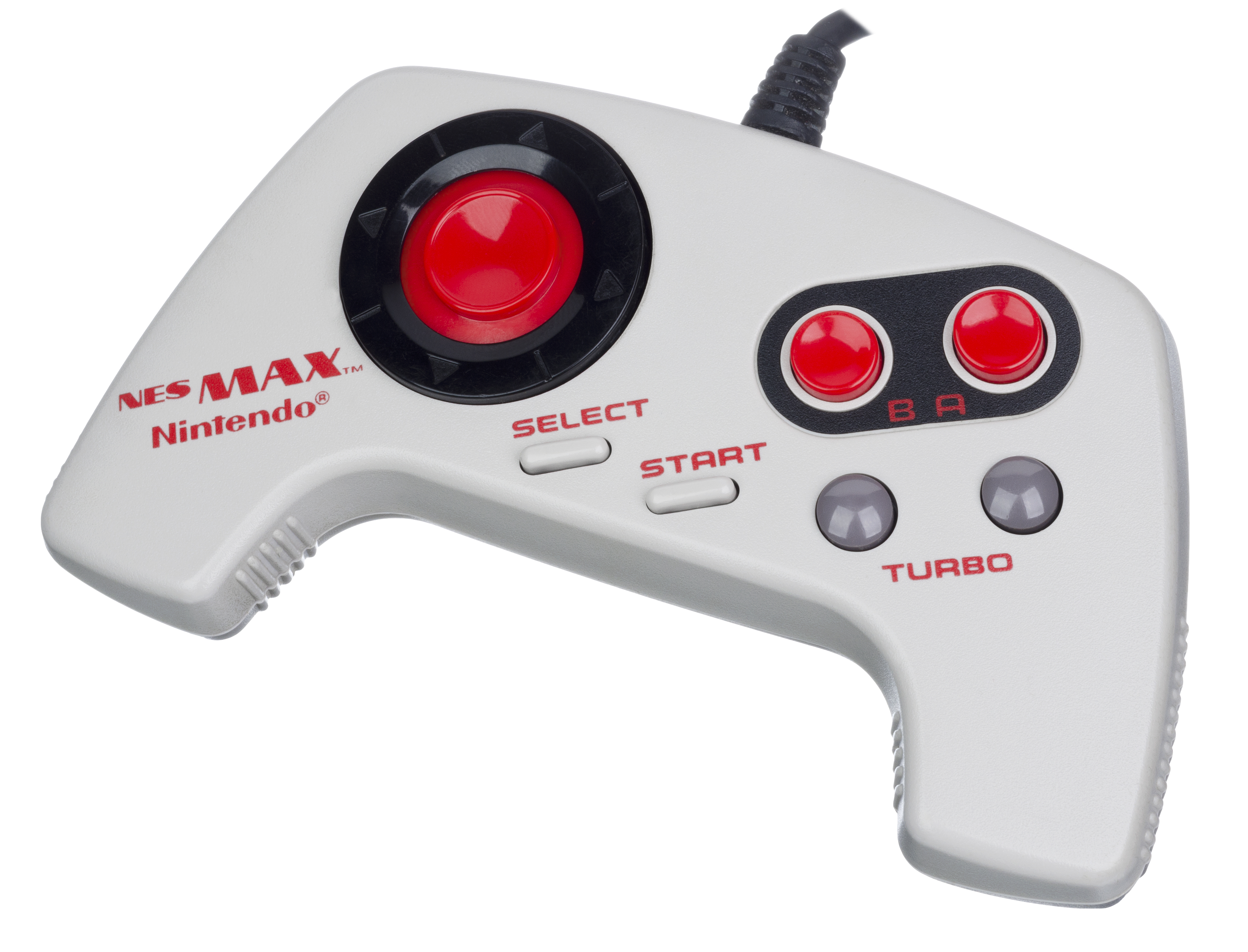
NES Max

Original Famicom Kousenjuu Series Gun

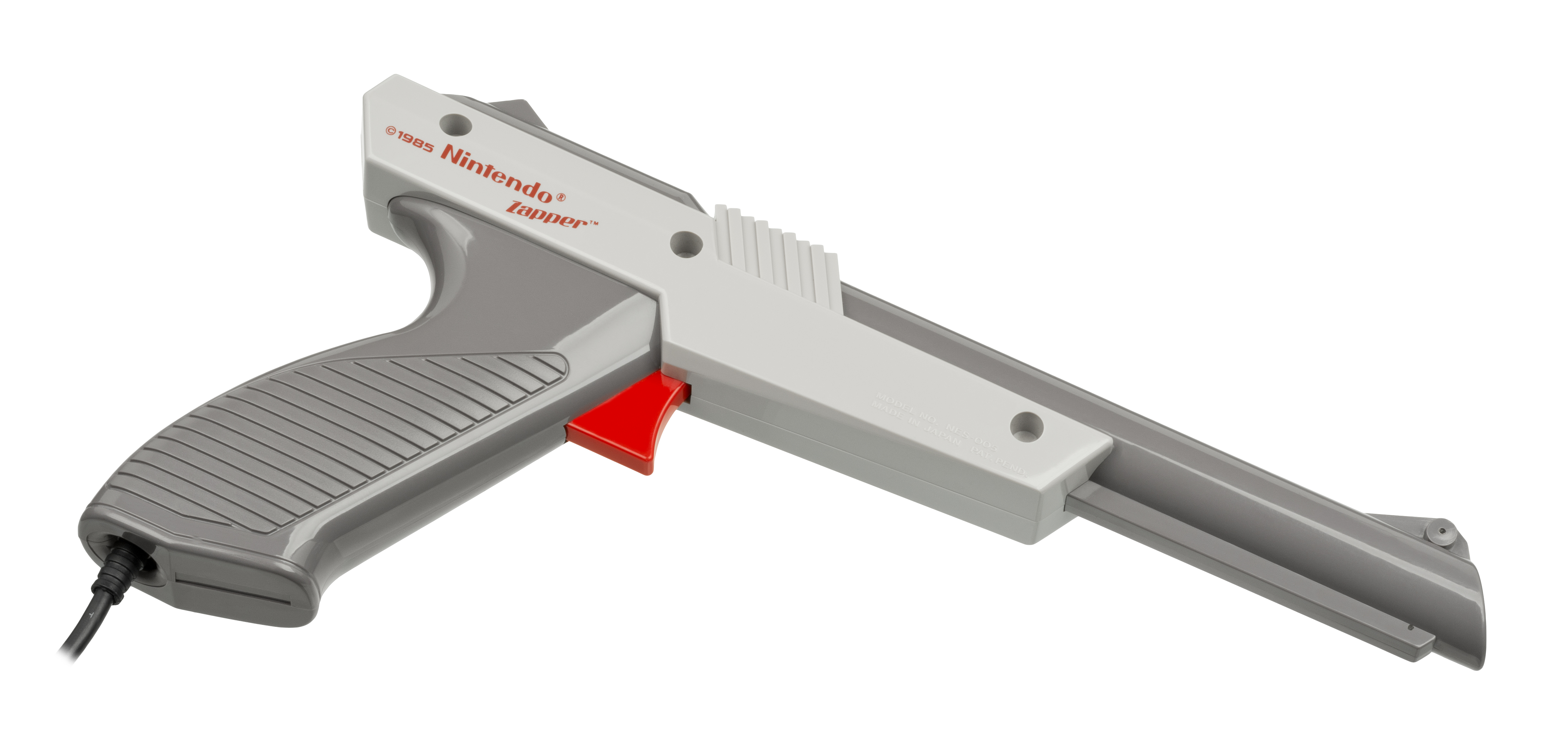
Original NES Zapper

The game controller for both the NES and the Famicom has an oblong brick-like design with a simple four button layout: two round buttons labelled "A" and "B", a "START" button, and a "SELECT" button. Additionally, the controllers use the cross-shaped D-pad, designed by Nintendo employee Gunpei Yokoi for Game & Watch systems, to replace the bulkier joysticks of controllers used by earlier gaming consoles.

The original model Famicom features two game controllers, both of which are hardwired to the back of the console. (Note: The original Famicom's controller cables extend into the console itself, connecting to the front of the motherboard. Nintendo considered the idea of detachable controllers, but ultimately scrapped it to reduce production costs.) The second controller lacks the Start and Select buttons, and instead features a small microphone; however, few games use this feature. The earliest produced Famicom units have square A and B buttons; issues with them getting stuck when pressed down led Nintendo to change their shape to a circular design in subsequent units following the console's recall.

In contrast to the Famicom's hardwired controllers, the NES has two proprietary seven-pin ports on the front of the console to support detachable controllers and third-party peripherals. The controllers bundled with the NES are identical and include the Start and Select buttons, lacking the microphone on the original Famicom's second controller. The cables for NES controllers are also generally three times longer than their Famicom counterparts.

Several special controllers are intended for use with specific games but not commonly used. Such peripherals include the NES Zapper (a light gun), R.O.B. (a toy robot), and the Power Pad (a dance pad). The original Famicom has a deepened DA-15 expansion port on the front of the unit to accommodate them.

Two official advanced controllers were produced for the NES: the NES Advantage, an arcade controller produced by Asciiware and licensed by Nintendo of America; and the NES Max, a controller with grip handles and a "cycloid" sliding-disc D-pad in place of the traditional one. Both controllers have a "Turbo" feature that simulates multiple rapid presses for the A and B buttons; the NES Max has manually pressed Turbo buttons, and the NES Advantage offers toggle buttons for Turbo functionality, along with knobs that adjust the firing rate of each button. The latter also includes a "Slow" button that rapidly pauses games; however, this function is not intended for games that invoke a pause menu or screen.

The standard controller was redesigned for the introduction of the New-Style NES in 1993. This version retained detachable controller ports and the original button layout, but the shape was changed to loosely resemble that of the Super Famicom/SNES controller; its shape has led to it being nicknamed the "dog bone" controller.

Nintendo created a knitting machine that interfaced with the NES and showed it at CES in 1987 for "business feedback", although the accessory was ultimately not released as a product. Nintendo spokesperson Howard Phillips demoed it for Toys "R" Us in the late 1980s, and an advertisement used the headline "Now you're knitting with power!" in reference to the slogan used by Nintendo at the time.

==== Japanese peripherals ====
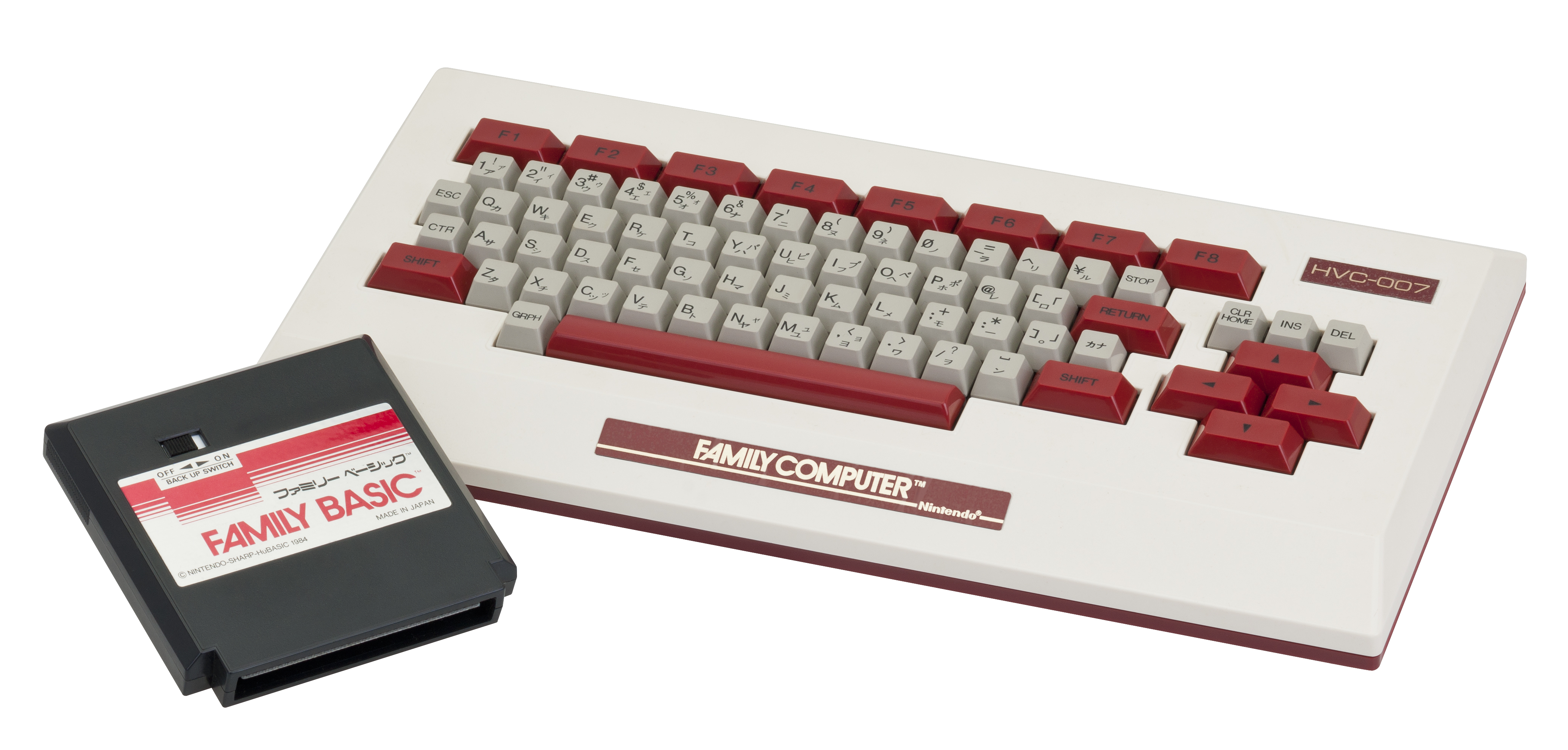
The Japanese Famicom has BASIC support with the Family BASIC keyboard.

Few of the numerous peripheral devices and software packages for the Famicom were released outside Japan.

The Famicom 3D System, an active shutter 3D headset peripheral released in 1987, enabled the ability to play stereoscopic video games. It was a commercial failure and never released outside Japan; users described the headset as bulky and uncomfortable. Seven games are compatible with the glasses, with three of them developed by Square; two titles received worldwide releases as Rad Racer and The 3-D Battles of WorldRunner.

Family BASIC is an implementation of BASIC for the Famicom, packaged with a keyboard. Similar in concept to the Atari 2600's BASIC Progamming cartridge, it allows the user to write programs, especially games, which can be saved on an included cassette recorder. Nintendo of America rejected releasing Family BASIC in the US, due to the NES's primary marketing demographic being children.

The Family Computer Network System connected a Famicom to a now-defunct proprietary network in Japan which provided content such as financial services. A dial-up modem was reportedly being produced for the NES in a partnership with Fidelity Investments, but was ultimately not released.

===== Famicom Disk System =====
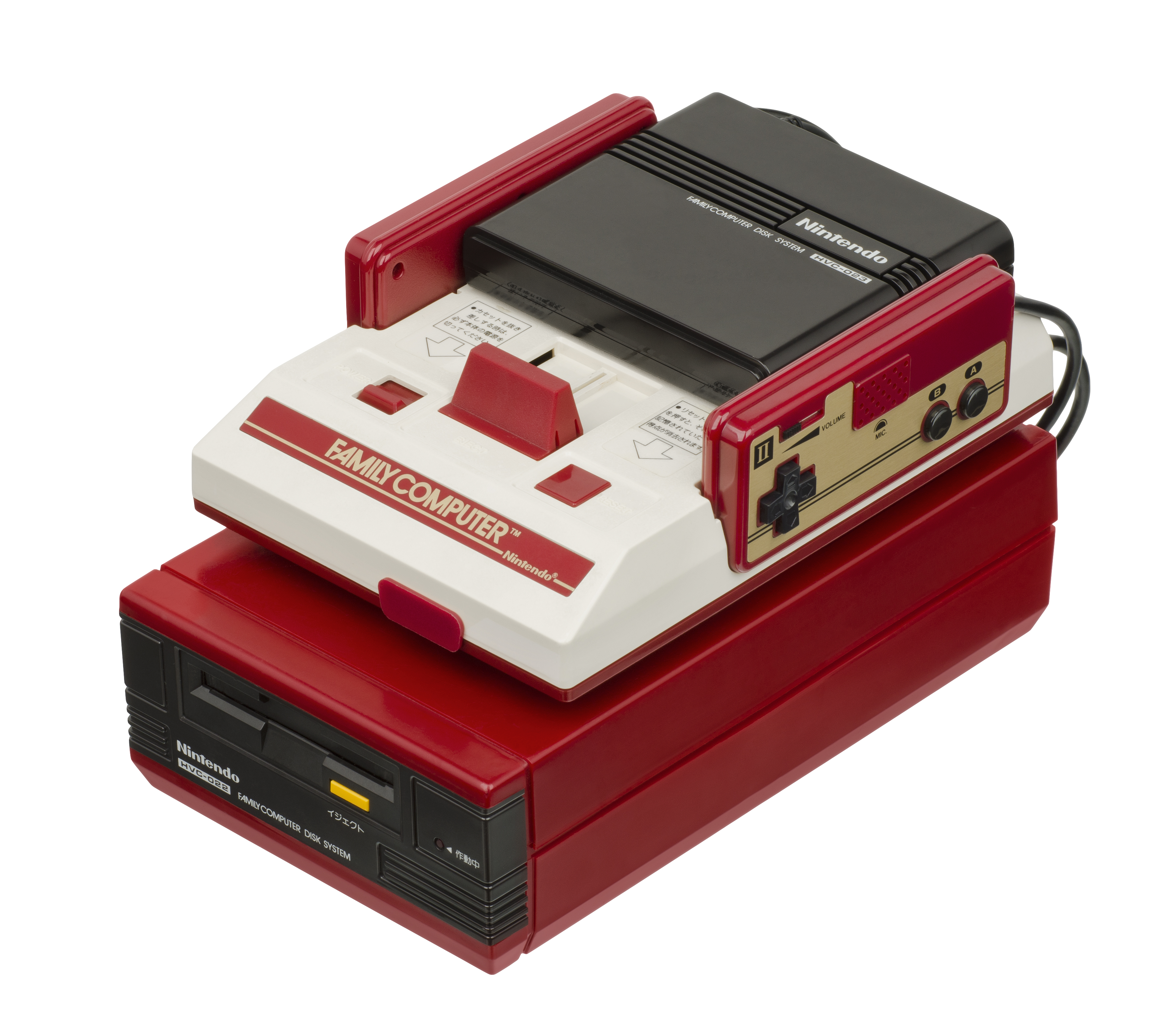
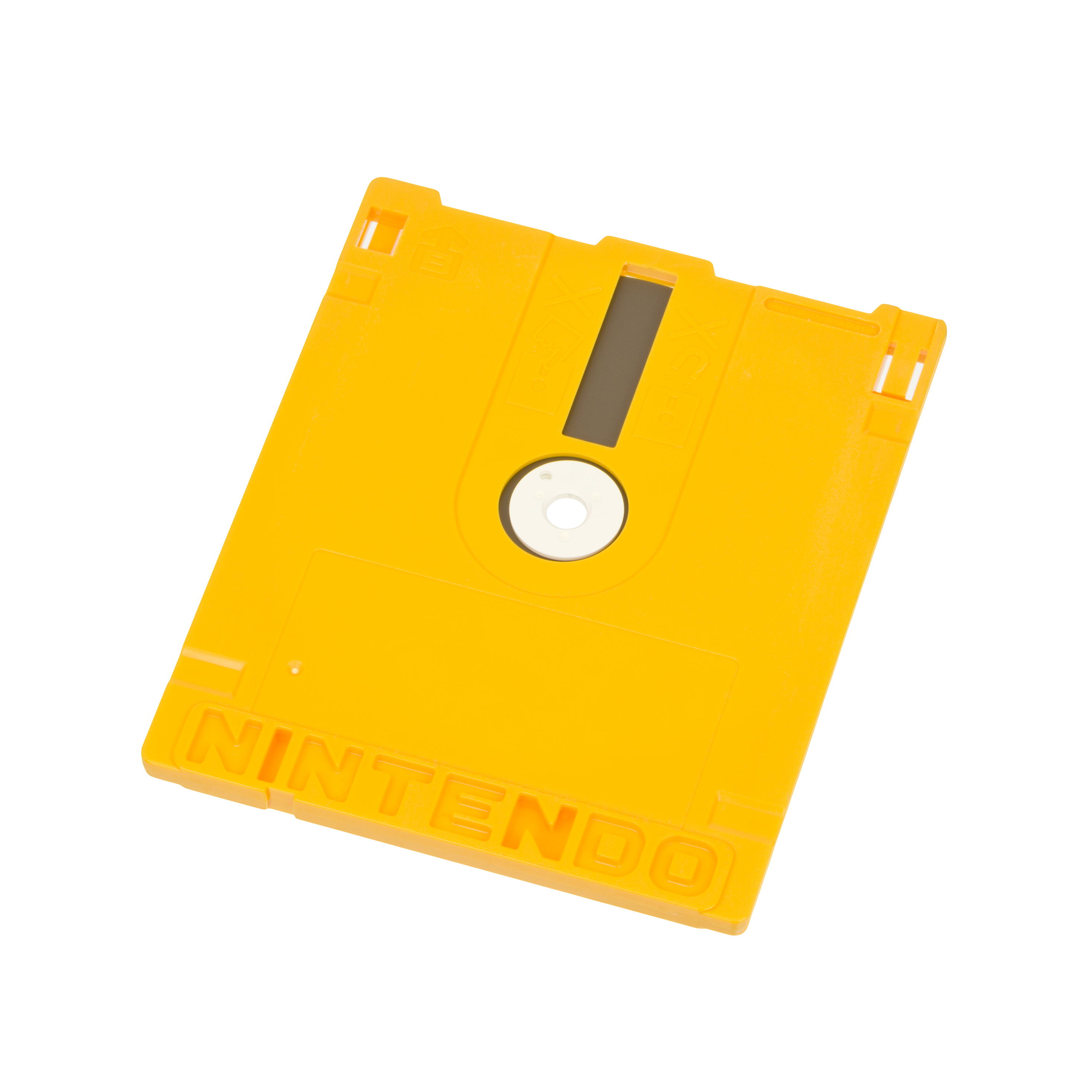
The Disk System peripheral for the Famicom uses games on Disk Cards with a 3-inch (76 mm) floppy disk drive.

By 1986, the cost and size limitations of ROM chips used in the Famicom's ROM cartridges were apparent, with no new advancements present to address them. With this in mind, Nintendo looked at the personal computer (PC) market, where the floppy disk was gaining wide adoption as a computer data storage medium. Partnering with Mitsumi to develop a floppy disk add-on for the Famicom based on the latter's Quick Disk format, Nintendo officially released it as the Family Computer Disk System (or Famicom Disk System) in Japan on February 21, 1986, at a retail price of ¥15,000.

The advantages of the format (called "Disk Card") were apparent on launch. It has more than triple the data storage capacity of the then-largest cartridge (used for Super Mario Bros.), introduced game save capability, and had lower production costs compared to cartridges, which resulted in lower retail prices. The add-on also has a new wavetable synthesis sound channel and more data storage for the Famicom's audio sample channel. Taking advantage of the disk's re-writability, Nintendo set up Disk Writer interactive kiosks at retail stores throughout Japan; at each kiosk, consumers could buy new games to rewrite onto their old disks or onto new disks. Disk Fax kiosks allowed players to submit their high scores on special blue disks for contests and rankings, predating online leaderboards by several years.

Although Nintendo committed to exclusively releasing games on the Disk System after its release, numerous external issues plagued its long-term viability. Just four months after launch, Capcom released a Famicom port of Makaimura (known as Ghosts 'n Goblins in the US) on a cartridge with more data storage capacity than what was possible on Disk Cards, nullifying one of the Disk System's major advantages by using discrete logic chips to perform bank switching. Nintendo also demanded half of the copyright ownership for each game it selected for release on the Disk System, resulting in developers electing to remain on cartridge instead as the latter gained functionality previously considered unique to the former. Developers disliked the lower profit margin of the Disk Writer kiosks, and retailers complained of their use of valuable space as demand for the format waned.

Usage of a floppy disk-based medium brought about further complications; Disk Cards were more fragile than cartridges and were prone to data corruption from magnetic exposure. Their unreliability was exacerbated by their lack of a shutter, which Nintendo substituted with a wax sleeve and clear keep case to reduce costs; blue disks and later Disk Cards included shutters. The rubber belt-based disk drives were also unreliable, with cryptic error codes complicating troubleshooting; even when fully functional, players accustomed to cartridges were annoyed with the introduction of loading times and disk flipping. Furthermore, the rewritable nature of the format resulted in rampant software piracy, with Nintendo's attempts at anti-piracy measures quickly defeated.

Despite selling close to two million Disk System units in 1986, Nintendo only managed to increase the total to 4.4 million units by 1990, falling well short of internal projections. By then, the Disk System was rendered obsolete due to advancements in ROM cartridge production, such as memory mapping chips (Note: Nintendo officially referred to such chips as "memory management controllers" (MMC); they were originally described as "multi-memory controllers" in their patents.) for expanded data storage capacity, battery-backed SRAM for game saving, and declining overall production costs. Nintendo alluded to a western release for the Disk System, going so far as to successfully file a US patent for it and having the Famicom's cartridge pins used by its RAM Adapter for enhanced audio rerouted to the NES's seldom-used bottom expansion port. However, such a release never materialized due to the Disk System's lackluster reception in Japan. Most of its games were re-released with workarounds on cartridge for both the Famicom and NES, without the enhanced audio. Although the last game for the Disk System was released in December 1992, Nintendo continued offering repair and rewrite services for it until September 2003.

=== NES Test Station ===
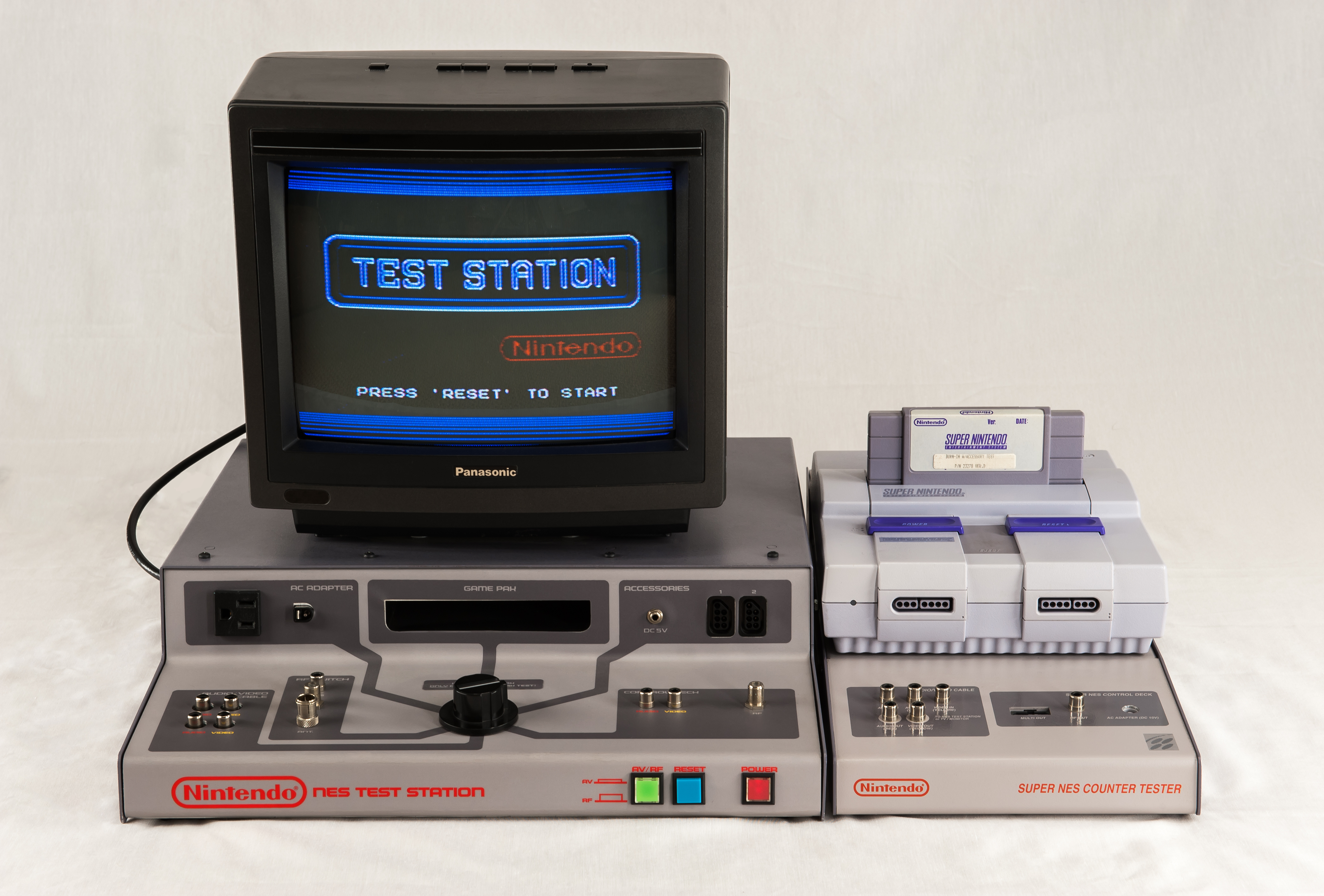
The NES Test station (lower left), SNES counter tester (lower right), SNES test cart (upper right), and TV

The NES Test Station diagnostics machine, an NES-based unit designed for testing NES hardware, components, and games, was introduced in 1988. It was only provided for use in World of Nintendo boutiques as part of the Nintendo World Class Service program. Visitors were to bring items to test with the station, and could be assisted by a store technician or employee.

The NES Test Station's front has a Game Pak slot and connectors for testing various components (AC adapter, RF switch, Audio/Video cable, NES Control Deck, accessories and games), with a centrally located selector knob to choose which component to test. The unit itself weighs approximately 5.3 kilograms (11.7 lb) and connects to a television via a combined A/V and RF Switch cable. By actuating the green button, a user can toggle between an A/V Cable or RF Switch connection. The television it is connected to (typically 11" to 14") is meant to be placed atop it.

=== Famicom Box ===
In 1986, Nintendo produced a commercial-use version of the Famicom in Japan, the Famicom Box, intended for hotels and resorts. Players paid to play pre-installed games contained on black NES cartridges. It featured Nintendo Entertainment System branding despite being Japan-only. In 2026, Famicom Box systems were discovered still in use in a Japanese love hotel.

== Games ==
=== Game Pak ===
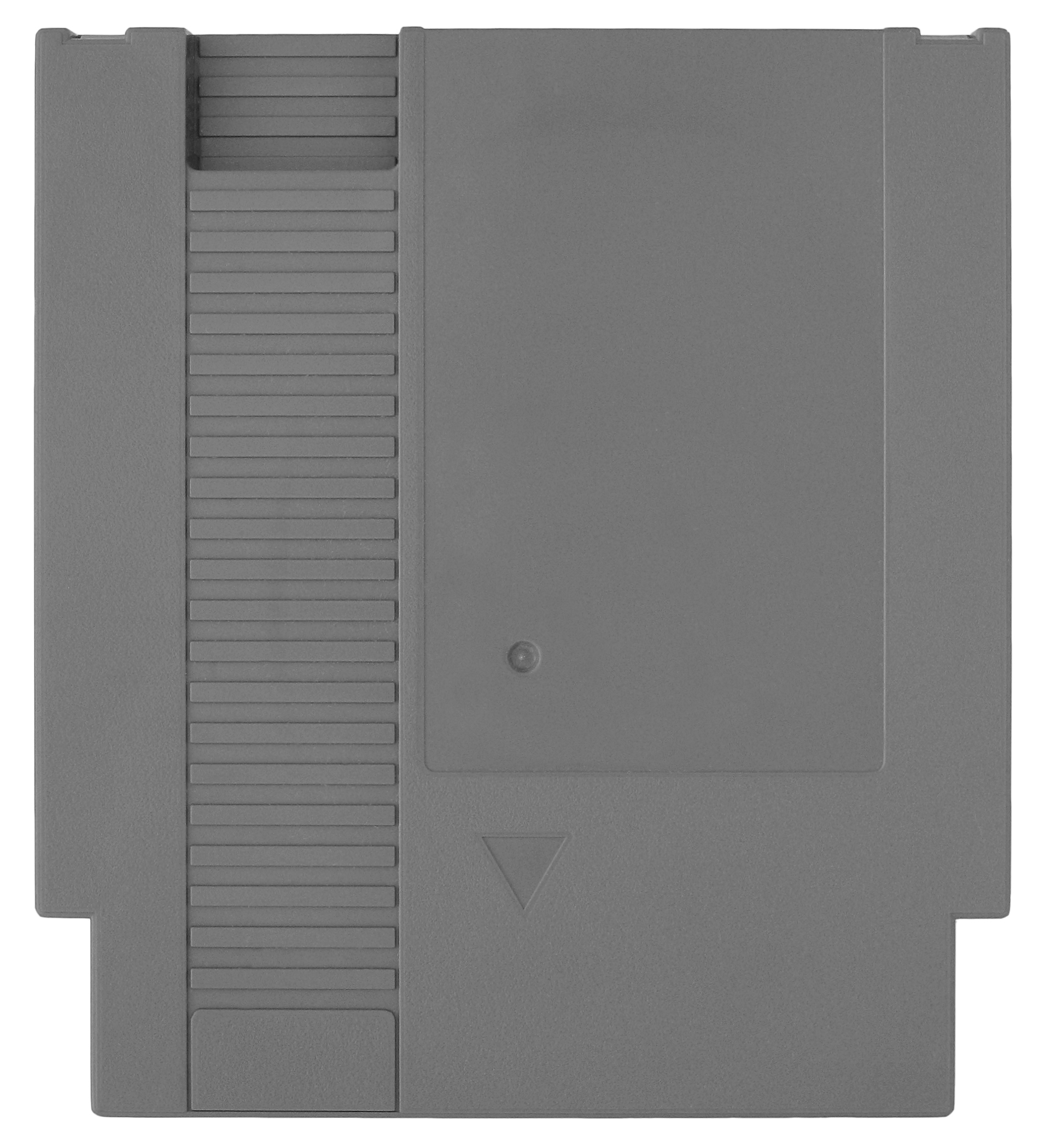
North American and PAL NES cartridges (or "Game Paks") are significantly larger than Japanese Famicom cartridges.

The NES uses a 72-pin design, compared to 60 pins on the Famicom. To reduce costs and inventory, some early games released in North America are simply Famicom cartridges attached to an adapter to fit inside the NES hardware. Early NES cartridges are held together with five small slotted screws.

The back of the cartridge bears a label with handling instructions. Production and software revision codes were imprinted as stamps on the back label to correspond with the software version and producer. All licensed NTSC and PAL cartridges are a standard shade of gray plastic, with the exceptions of The Legend of Zelda and Zelda II: The Adventure of Link, which were manufactured in gold plastic cartridges. Unlicensed cartridges were produced in black, robin egg blue, and gold, and are all slightly different shapes than standard NES cartridges. Nintendo also produced yellow plastic cartridges for internal use at Nintendo Service Centers, although these "test carts" were never made available for purchase. All licensed US cartridges were manufactured by Nintendo, Konami, and Acclaim.

Famicom cartridges are shaped slightly differently. Unlike NES games, official Famicom cartridges were produced in many colors of plastic. Adapters, similar in design to the popular accessory Game Genie, are available that allow Famicom games to be played on an NES. In Japan, several companies manufactured the cartridges for the Famicom. This allowed these companies to develop customized chips designed for specific purposes, such as superior sound and graphics.

=== Third-party licensing ===
The Famicom Family mark appeared in games and peripherals from 1988 that were approved by Nintendo for compatibility with official Famicom consoles and derivatives.

Nintendo's near-monopoly on the home video game market left it with a dominant influence over the industry. Unlike Atari, which never actively pursued third-party developers (and even went to court in an attempt to force Activision to cease production of Atari 2600 games), Nintendo had anticipated and encouraged the involvement of third-party software developers, albeit strictly on its own terms.

To this end, a 10NES authentication chip is in every console and licensed cartridge. If the console's chip can not detect a counterpart chip inside the cartridge, the game does not load. Nintendo portrayed these measures as intended to protect consumers from what it saw as poor-quality games, and placed a golden seal of approval on all licensed games released for the system.

Nintendo was not as restrictive as Sega, which did not permit third-party publishers until Mediagenic in late summer 1988. Nintendo's intention was to reserve a large part of NES game revenue for itself. The company required that it be the sole manufacturer of all cartridges, and that the publisher had to pay in full before the cartridges for that game be produced. Cartridges could not be returned to Nintendo, so publishers assumed all the risk. As a result, some publishers lost more money due to distress sales of remaining inventory at the end of the NES era than they ever earned in profits from sales of the games. Because Nintendo controlled the production of all cartridges, it was able to enforce strict rules on its third-party developers, who were required to sign a contract that would obligate them to develop exclusively for the system, order at least 10,000 cartridges, and only make five games per year. The global 1988 shortage of DRAM and ROM chips reportedly caused Nintendo to only permit an average of 25% of publishers' requests for cartridges, with some receiving much higher amounts and others receiving almost none. GameSpy noted that Nintendo's "iron-clad terms" made the company many enemies during the 1980s. Some developers tried to circumvent the five game limit by creating additional company brands like Konami's Ultra Games label; others tried circumventing the 10NES chip.

Due to its strict licensing requirements, Nintendo was accused of antitrust violations. The United States Department of Justice and several states began probing the company's business practices, leading to the involvement of Congress and the Federal Trade Commission (FTC). The FTC conducted an extensive investigation which included interviewing hundreds of retailers. During the FTC probe, Nintendo changed the terms of its publisher licensing agreements to eliminate the two-year rule and other restrictive terms. Nintendo and the FTC settled the case in April 1991, with Nintendo being required to send vouchers giving a $5 discount off to a new game, to every person that had purchased an NES game between June 1988 and December 1990. GameSpy remarked that Nintendo's punishment was particularly weak given the case's findings, although it has been speculated that the FTC did not want to damage the video game industry in the United States.

With the NES near the end of its life, many third-party publishers such as Electronic Arts supported upstart competing consoles with less strict licensing terms, such as the Sega Genesis and the PlayStation, which respectively eroded and took over Nintendo's dominance in the home console market. Consoles from Nintendo's rivals in the post-SNES era had always enjoyed much stronger third-party support than Nintendo, which relied more heavily on first-party games.

==== Unlicensed games ====
Companies that refused to pay the licensing fee or were rejected by Nintendo found ways to circumvent the console's authentication system. Most of these companies created circuits that use a voltage spike to temporarily disable the 10NES chip. A few unlicensed games released in Europe and Australia are in the form of a dongle to connect to a licensed game and use its 10NES chip for authentication. To combat this, Nintendo of America threatened to revoke the supply of licensed games from retailers who sold unlicensed games, and multiple revisions were made to the NES PCBs to prevent unlicensed cartridges from working.

Atari Games took a different approach with its console game subsidiary Tengen, who attempted to reverse engineer the lock-out chip to develop its own "Rabbit" chip. Tengen also obtained a description of the lock-out chip from the United States Patent and Trademark Office by falsely claiming that it was required to defend against present infringement claims. Nintendo successfully sued Tengen for copyright infringement; however, Tengen's antitrust claims against Nintendo were never decided.

Color Dreams made Christian video games under the subsidiary name Wisdom Tree. Historian Steven Kent wrote that "Wisdom Tree presented Nintendo with a prickly situation. The general public did not seem to pay close attention to the court battle with Atari Games, and industry analysts were impressed with Nintendo's legal acumen; but going after a tiny company that published innocuous religious games was another story."

=== Game rentals ===
As the NES grew in popularity and entered millions of American homes, some small video rental shops began buying their own copies of NES games and renting them out to customers for around the same price as a video cassette rental for a few days. Nintendo received no profit from the practice, beyond the initial cost of their game; unlike movie rentals, a newly released game could circulate and be available for rent on the same day. Nintendo took steps to stop game rentals, but did not take any formal legal action until Blockbuster Video began to make game rentals a large-scale service. Nintendo claimed that allowing customers to rent games would significantly hurt sales and drive up the cost of games. Nintendo notably lost the lawsuit, but did win on a claim of copyright infringement. Blockbuster was banned from including photocopies of original, copyrighted instruction booklets with its rented games. In compliance with the ruling, Blockbuster printed its own short instructions, usually in the form of a small booklet, card, or label on the back of the rental box, which explained a game's basic premise and controls. Other video rental shops, however, continued the practice of renting video games.

== Reception ==
By 1988, industry observers stated that the NES's popularity had grown so quickly that the market for Nintendo cartridges was larger than all home computer software combined. Compute! reported in 1989 that Nintendo had sold seven million NES systems in 1988 alone, almost as many as the number of Commodore 64s sold in that system's first five years on the market. "Computer game makers [are] scared stiff", the magazine said, stating that Nintendo's popularity caused most competitors to have poor sales during the previous holiday season, and resulted in serious financial problems for some.

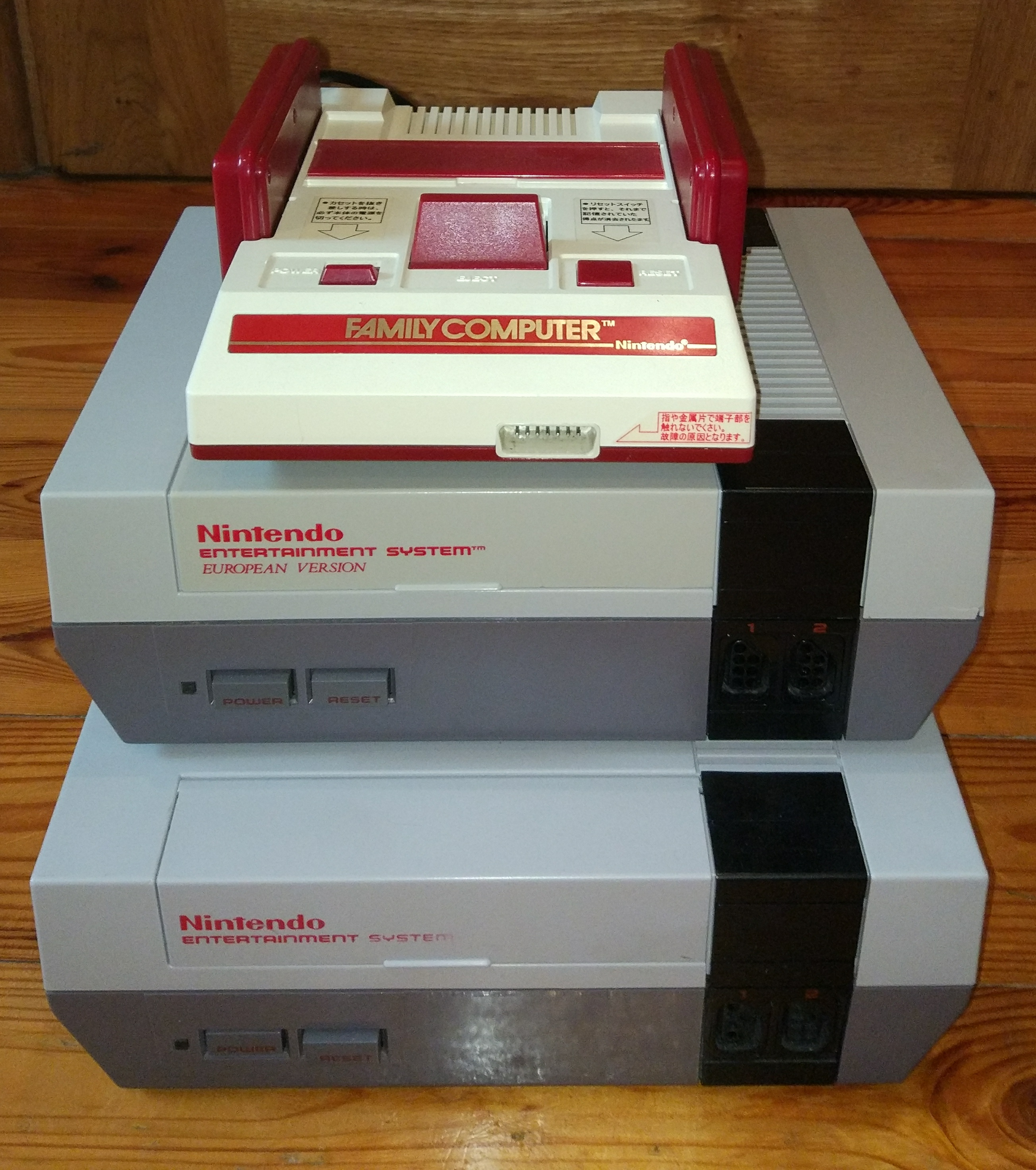
Comparison of NES from different regions. From top: Japanese Famicom, European NES, and American NES.

In June 1989, Peter Main, Nintendo of America's vice president of marketing, said that the Famicom was present in 37% of households in Japan. By 1990, the NES was present in 30% of households in the United States, compared to 23% for all personal computers. By 1990, the NES had outsold all previously released consoles worldwide.

In the early 1990s, some predicted that competition from technologically superior systems such as the 16-bit Mega Drive would mean the immediate end of the NES's dominance. Instead, during the first year of the Famicom's successor, the Super Famicom (named Super Nintendo Entertainment System outside Japan), the Famicom was the second highest-selling video game console in Japan, outselling the newer and more powerful PC Engine and Mega Drive by a wide margin. The console remained popular in Japan and North America until late 1993, when the demand for new NES software abruptly plummeted. The final licensed games for the console were Adventure Island IV in Japan (released on June 24, 1994), Wario's Woods in North America (December 10, 1994), and The Lion King in Europe (May 25, 1995). In the wake of ever decreasing sales and the lack of new games, Nintendo of America officially discontinued the NES in 1995. Nintendo produced new Famicom units in Japan until September 25, 2003, and continued to repair Famicom consoles until October 31, 2007, attributing the discontinuation of support to insufficient supplies of parts.

The NES was initially not as successful in Europe during the late 1980s, when it was outsold by the Master System and ZX Spectrum in the United Kingdom. By 1990, the Master System was the highest-selling console in Europe, even as the NES was beginning to have a fast-growing user base in the UK. During the early 1990s, NES sales caught up with and narrowly overtook the Master System overall in Western Europe; however, the Master System maintained its lead in several markets such as the UK, Belgium, and Spain.

== Legacy ==
A Nintendo Entertainment System and Game Boy on display at the Computer History Museum

The NES was released two years after the video game crash of 1983, when many retailers and adult consumers regarded electronic games as a passing fad, so many believed at first that the NES would soon fade. Before the NES and Famicom, Nintendo was known as a moderately successful Japanese toy and playing card manufacturer, but the console's popularity helped the company grow into an internationally recognized name almost synonymous with video games as Atari had been, and also set the stage for Japanese dominance of the video game industry in the 1980s and 1990s. With the NES, Nintendo also changed the relationship between console manufacturers and third-party software developers by restricting developers from publishing and distributing software without licensed approval. This led to higher-quality games, which helped change the attitude of a public that had grown weary from poorly produced games for earlier systems.

The hardware design of the NES is also very influential. Nintendo chose the name "Nintendo Entertainment System" for the US market and redesigned the system so it would not give the appearance of a child's toy. The front-loading cartridge input allowed it to be used more easily in a TV stand with other entertainment devices such as a videocassette recorder.

The system's hardware limitations led to design principles that still influence the development of modern video games. Many prominent game franchises originated on the NES, including Nintendo's own Super Mario Bros., The Legend of Zelda, and Metroid, as well as Capcom's Mega Man, Konami's Castlevania, Square's Final Fantasy, and Enix's Dragon Quest.

The imagery of the NES, especially its controller, has become a popular motif for a variety of products, including Nintendo's Game Boy Advance. The original NES controller has become one of the most recognizable symbols of the console. Nintendo has mimicked the look of the controller in several products, including merchandise and limited-edition versions of the Game Boy Advance. At the Tokyo Game Show in 2023, the Famicom was given the Minister of Economy, Trade and Industry award for its influence and for laying down the foundations for the game industry. In 2011, IGN named the NES the greatest video game console of all time.

=== Emulation ===
The NES can be emulated on many other systems. The earliest known NES emulator was known simply as the Family Computer Emulator. Developed by Haruhisa Udagawa, it was made available in 1990 for the FM Towns computer. The earliest emulator for IBM PC compatibles was the Japanese-only Pasofami. It was soon followed by iNES, which is available in English and is cross-platform, in 1996. It was described as being the first NES emulation software that could be used by a non-expert. The first version of NESticle, an unofficial MS-DOS-based emulator, was released on April 3, 1997. Nintendo offers licensed emulation of select NES games via its Virtual Console service for the Wii, Nintendo 3DS, and Wii U, and via its Nintendo Classics service for Nintendo Switch and Nintendo Switch 2.

=== Re-release ===
On July 14, 2016, Nintendo announced the November 2016 launch of a miniature replica of the NES, known as the Nintendo Entertainment System: NES Classic Edition in the United States and as the Nintendo Classic Mini: Nintendo Entertainment System in Europe and Australia. The emulation-based console, released on November 10, 2016, includes 30 pre-installed games from the NES library, including the Super Mario Bros. and The Legend of Zelda series. The system has HDMI display output and a new replica controller, which can also connect to the Wii Remote for use with Virtual Console games. It was discontinued in North America on April 13, 2017, followed by the rest of the world on April 15, 2017. However, Nintendo announced in September 2017 that the NES Classic Mini would return to production on June 29, 2018, only to be discontinued again permanently by December of that year.

== See also ==
- History of Nintendo
- Nintendo hard
- Nintendo World Championships

== Bibliography ==
- Altice, Nathan (2015). I Am Error: The Nintendo Family Computer/Entertainment System Platform. MIT Press. ISBN 978-0-262-02877-6. Archived from the original on January 11, 2020 – via Google Books.
