= Nintendo Entertainment System models =

Overview of NES model variants

The Nintendo Entertainment System (NES), an 8-bit third-generation home video game console produced by Nintendo, had numerous model variants produced throughout its lifetime. It was originally released on July 15, 1983 as the Family Computer (Note: Japanese: ファミリーコンピュータ, Hepburn: Famirī Konpyūta) (and widely known as the Famicom (Note: Japanese: ファミコン, Hepburn: Famikon)) in Japan, with design work led by Masayuki Uemura. Nintendo intentionally redesigned it as the NES in North America in an attempt to avoid the stigma of video game consoles lingering from the video game crash the same year; while it was initially conceptualized as a home computer, it was ultimately modeled after a videocassette recorder (VCR) for its debut there on October 18, 1985. Subsequently, the NES was exported to Europe and Oceania via local distributors.

Uemura's former employer Sharp Corporation, which previously collaborated with Nintendo on the Game & Watch, released three officially licensed Famicom variants in Japan: a CRT television with a built-in Famicom, a console that combined the Famicom and Famicom Disk System hardware in one package, and a console dedicated to video production. Only the television variant was given a release in North America. Meanwhile, Nintendo produced two arcade variants of the console: the Nintendo VS. System, released in 1984 to gauge consumer interest in the United States for then-unreleased Famicom games; and the PlayChoice-10, released in 1986 as a demonstration unit for NES games.

After the release of the Super Nintendo Entertainment System (SNES) on November 21, 1990, Nintendo released a compact, redesigned version of the NES/Famicom in late 1993. The company elected to revert to the top-loading cartridge slot with the NES due to reliability issues with the original front-loading slot. It was the sole design in production when the console was discontinued on September 25, 2003.

== Original variants ==
=== Family Computer ===
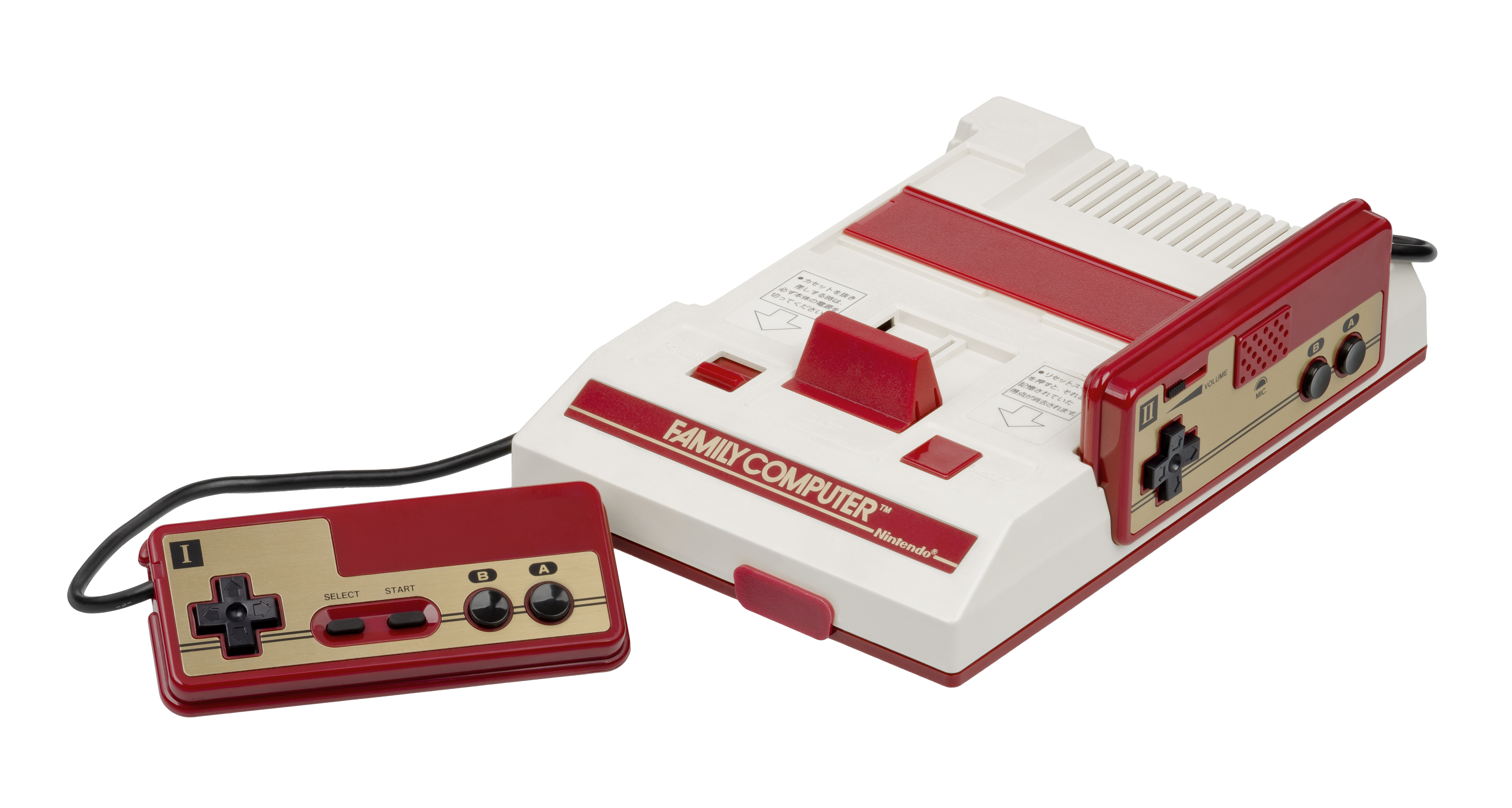
The original Family Computer ("Famicom") model with wired controllers

According to Uemura, video games were an unfamiliar concept to Japanese toy stores when they were introduced; the stores did not consider carrying them since they required televisions, which the stores did not sell at the time. Rather than targeting the educational market with PC-like styling, Uemura styled the Famicom like a toy as a cheaper option. While Uemura's team intended to use an inexpensive steel case, they switched to a durable plastic due to the fragility of the steel case. The red, gold, and white color scheme, chosen by Yamauchi, was inspired by two objects that used similar schemes: a scarf that he liked, and a set-top TV antenna from a company called DX Antenna.

Other design considerations took into account the lifestyles and attitudes of Japanese consumers at the time. Uemura had considered PC-like styling for the console, but elected to use a horizontally oriented design suited for placement on the floor; he felt Japanese consumers would prefer the latter as more relaxing. The controllers were designed to make the console's adoption among Japanese consumers easier; despite arriving on the market later than its competitors, the Game & Watch-inspired design provided a familiar control scheme for those who had already played one of its handheld electronic games, especially with the inclusion of a D-pad for versatility across game genres. They were also intentionally hardwired with short cables to keep players close to the console (and the TV by extension), ideal for Japanese houses due to their smaller layout compared to their American counterparts.

=== Nintendo Entertainment System ===
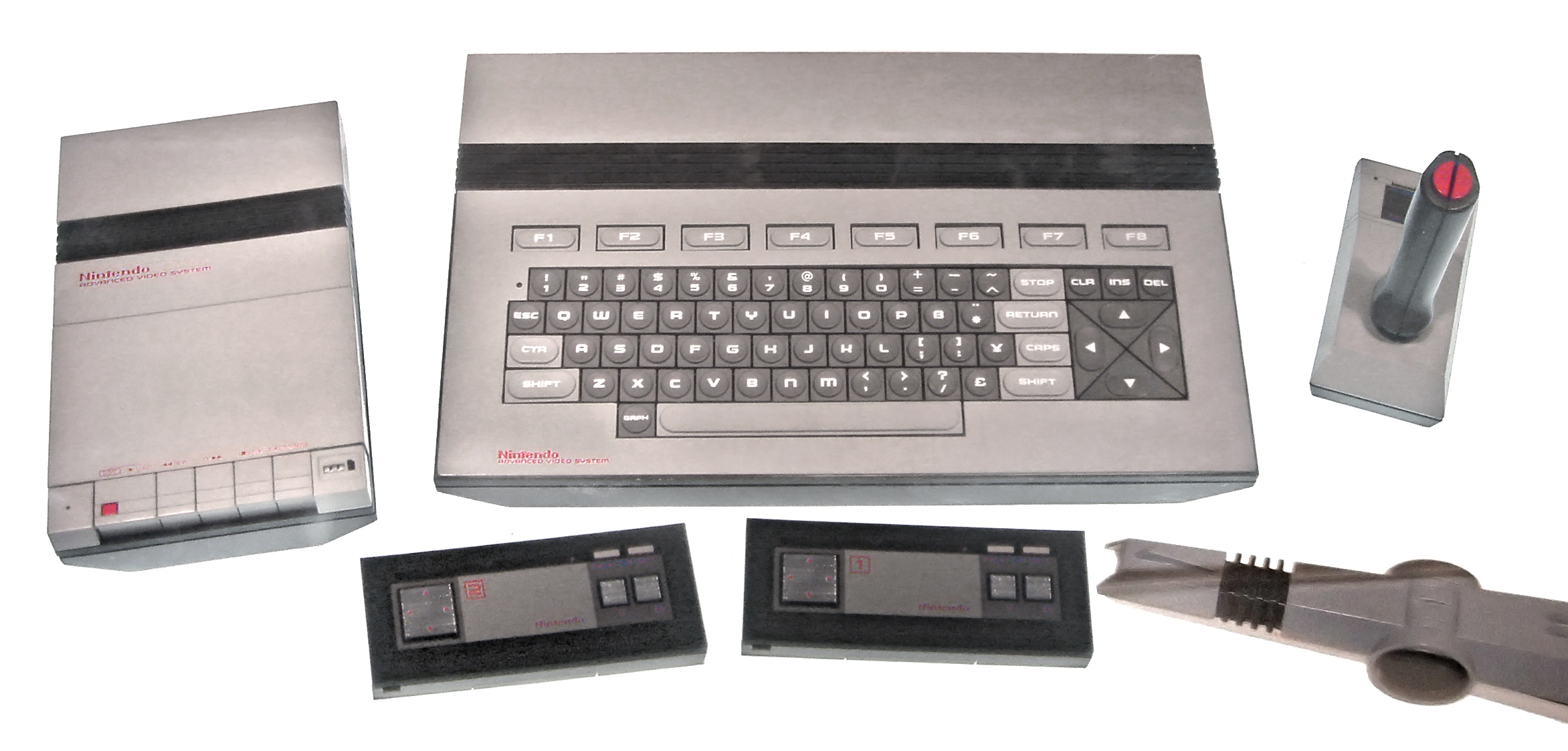
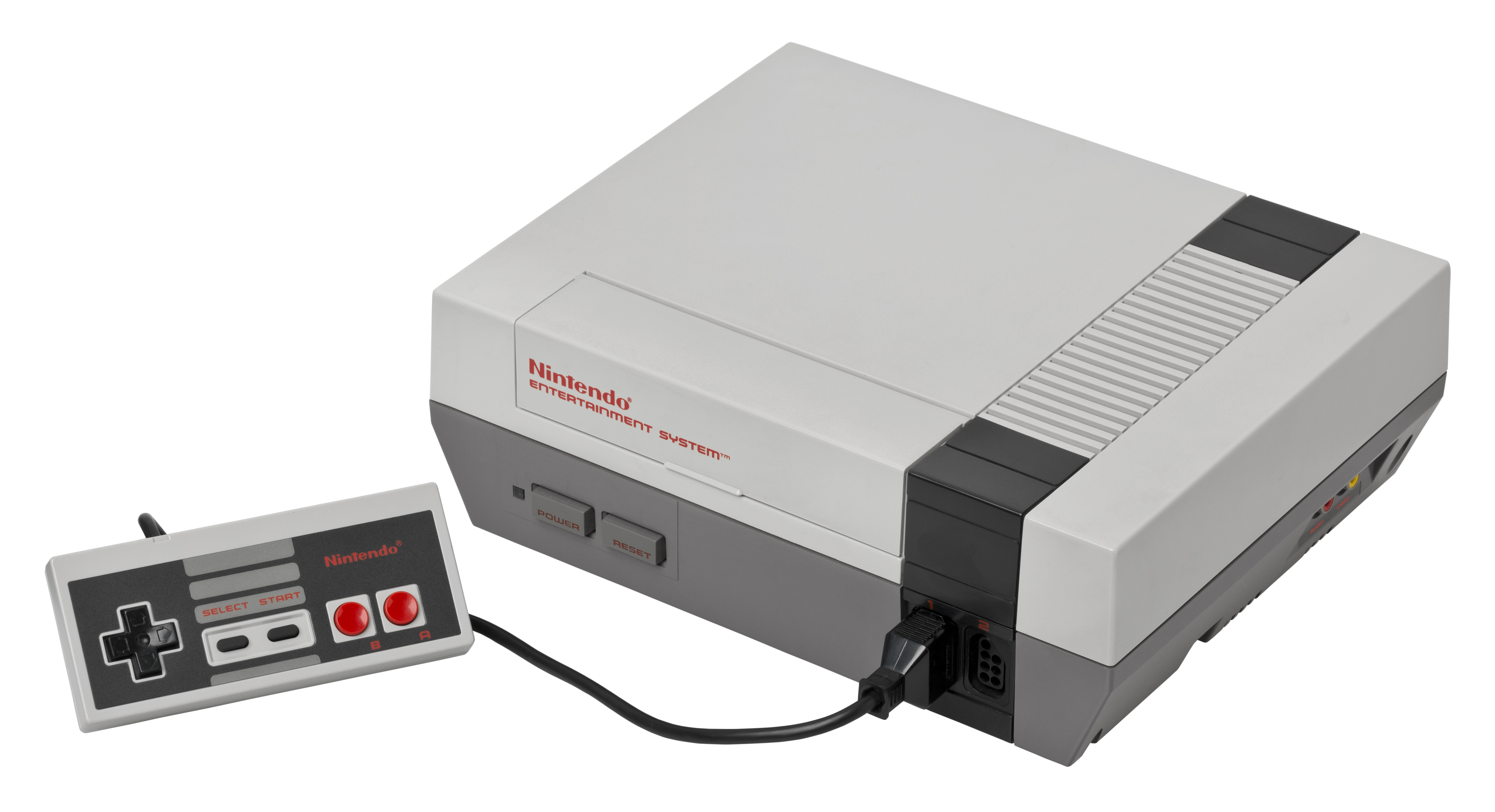
The Nintendo AVS was planned to include multiple peripherals (left) before it was redesigned to its final cost-reduced form as the NES.

Seeking to market the Famicom worldwide after its 1983 release in Japan, Nintendo forged a tentative distribution and rights agreement with Atari to market it outside the country as the Nintendo Enhanced Video System; however, both sides never consummated the deal as planned at the Summer CES in June 1983 due to a series of events that culminated in Atari collapsing amid the video game crash that year. Despite the pessimism of North American retailers, Yamauchi was still convinced that a launch there was feasible, so he ordered the introduction of a Famicom-based arcade system called the Nintendo VS. System the following year to gauge interest in the console's games there; the success of the system in North America encouraged Yamauchi to move forward with the launch.

Under the direction of Lance Barr and Don James, the former of which then held the position of "Design & Brand Director" at Nintendo of America (NOA), the Famicom was initially redesigned to resemble a home computer; christened the Nintendo Advanced Video System (AVS), it featured peripherals such as a computer keyboard, a musical keyboard, a tape drive, infrared wireless controllers, and a folding light gun. The console itself featured a Famicom-like top-loading system and cartridges, whereas the controller's D-pad had a square shape similar to that of Sega's Master System. The AVS was shown off at the Winter CES in January 1985, planned for a June release, to middling fanfare. Chief among the concerns identified by Nintendo was the lingering stigma from the 1983 crash and the high price point the console was likely to command.

After a cost-reduced revision of the AVS by Barr was showcased at the Summer CES that June as the Nintendo Entertainment System (NES), Nintendo subsequently conceived a new design for the NES with colorations from Barr and James. Known among Nintendo employees as the "lunch box", the design—credited to engineer Masayuki Yukawa—included a front-loading cartridge mechanism that was modeled after a videocassette recorder, mainly intended to further remove the console from the stigma of its contemporaries. Uemura later revealed in 2020 that the redesign was also intended to prevent a short circuit via direct contact with the hardware during cartridge insertion, which was especially problematic in a household full of static-inducing furniture in a semi-arid climate, as was the case in much of the Great Plains.

While most of the peripherals that accompanied the AVS were scrapped, the light gun was kept, albeit in a cost-reduced form as the NES Zapper. To further dissuade consumers from perceiving the NES as a console, Nintendo introduced the Nintendo Video Robot, a toy robot that acted as a second player in two games; the presence of the robot, which was eventually named the Robotic Operating Buddy (R.O.B.) by advertising manager Gail Tilden, helped convince reluctant toy shops to place orders for the NES before it launched in New York City on October 18, 1985.

==== PAL versions ====
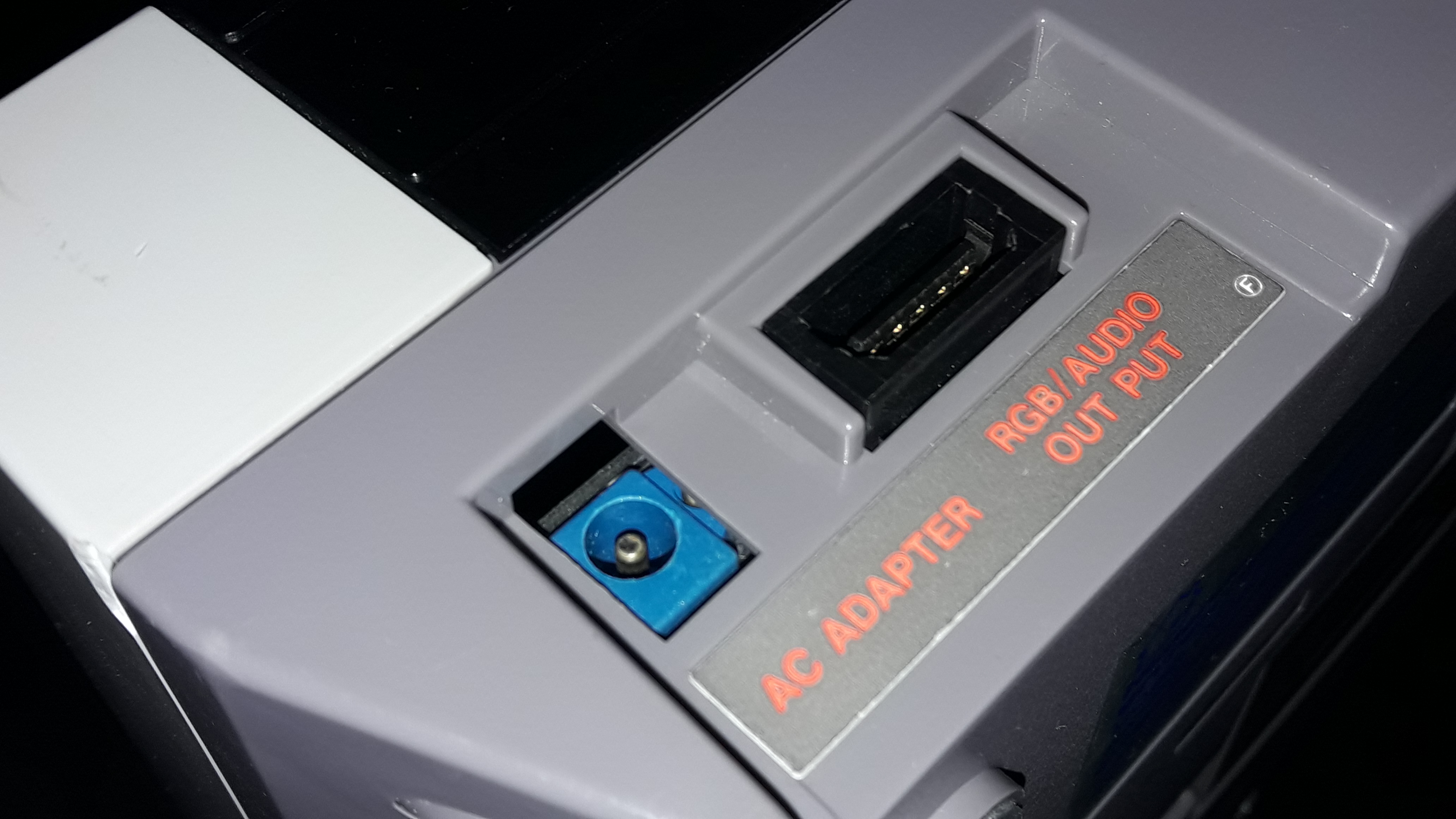
AC power socket and RGB AV port on a French NES

Nintendo also marketed the NES in PAL regions through local distributors, though the console did not find as much success as it did in North America. In Europe, it was first released in Scandinavia in late 1986. Nintendo then partnered with Mattel in 1987 to distribute the NES in the United Kingdom and Italy; the same year, the console was introduced to France, Belgium, the Netherlands, and Luxembourg via Nintendo Entertainment Systems International (NESI), a French private company led by former NOA salesperson Ron Judy. However, Mattel's lackluster marketing effort in the face of strong competition from the home computer market led Nintendo to give the British distribution rights to NESI the following year. NESI handed over its distribution rights to Bandai in 1992 before Nintendo reclaimed them in 1995. Other parts of the European market were not given as much attention, with the NES making its debut in Hungary, for example, in 1991 via the Austrian distributor.

In Oceania, Mattel gained the distribution rights for Australia and New Zealand, with both receiving the NES in mid-1987. While the console fared better in those countries compared to Europe, it did not gain significant traction until c. 1993. The same year, Nintendo established a regional subsidiary—Nintendo Australia—and subsequently reclaimed the distribution rights the following year.

Europe was split into two zones for distribution; the United Kingdom and Italy were designated as PAL-A, while the rest of Europe was designated as PAL-B. Consoles from one zone are not compatible with games from the other zone. Also, unique to the French NES consoles is the inclusion of an audiovisual (AV) port that outputs RGB video via a SCART connector instead of composite; however, since the NES is not capable of RGB output (in its original form), it converts the native composite signal to RGB.

==== Asian versions ====
The NES was also released in other regions of Asia outside Japan (except for mainland China). In particular, South Korea received the NES via distributor Hyundai Electronics as the Hyundai Comboy in October 1989. Nintendo could not sell the NES directly in the country as Japanese cultural imports were banned by the government at the time, dating back to the end of World War II; the ban stayed in effect until 2004. In India, a license-built version of the PAL-region NES was sold as the Samurai Electronic TV Game System. However, due to the prohibitively expensive price of the console, it sold poorly in the country; the Samurai brand was later reused on a series of unauthorised Famiclone consoles.

== Redesigned variant ==
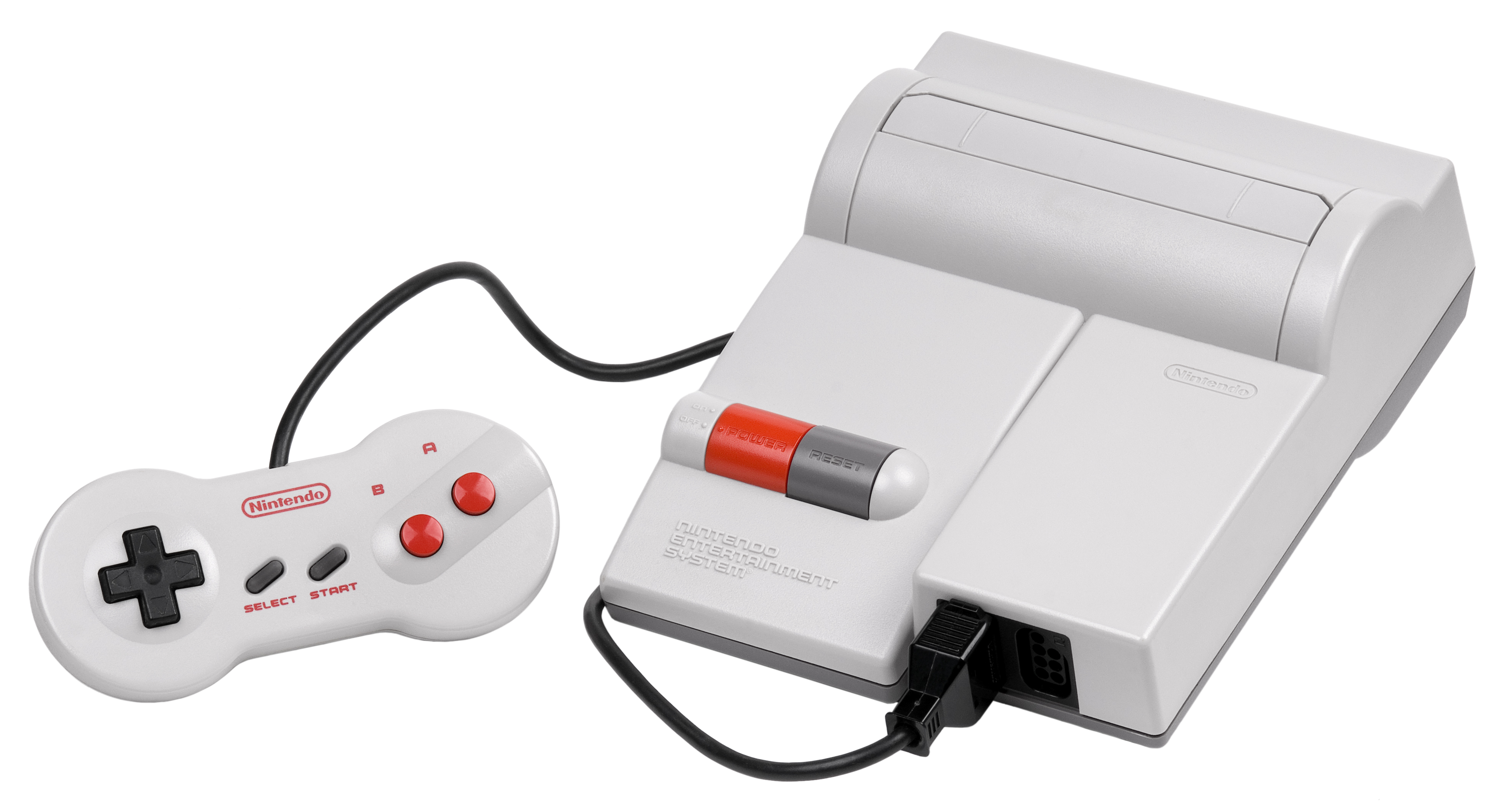
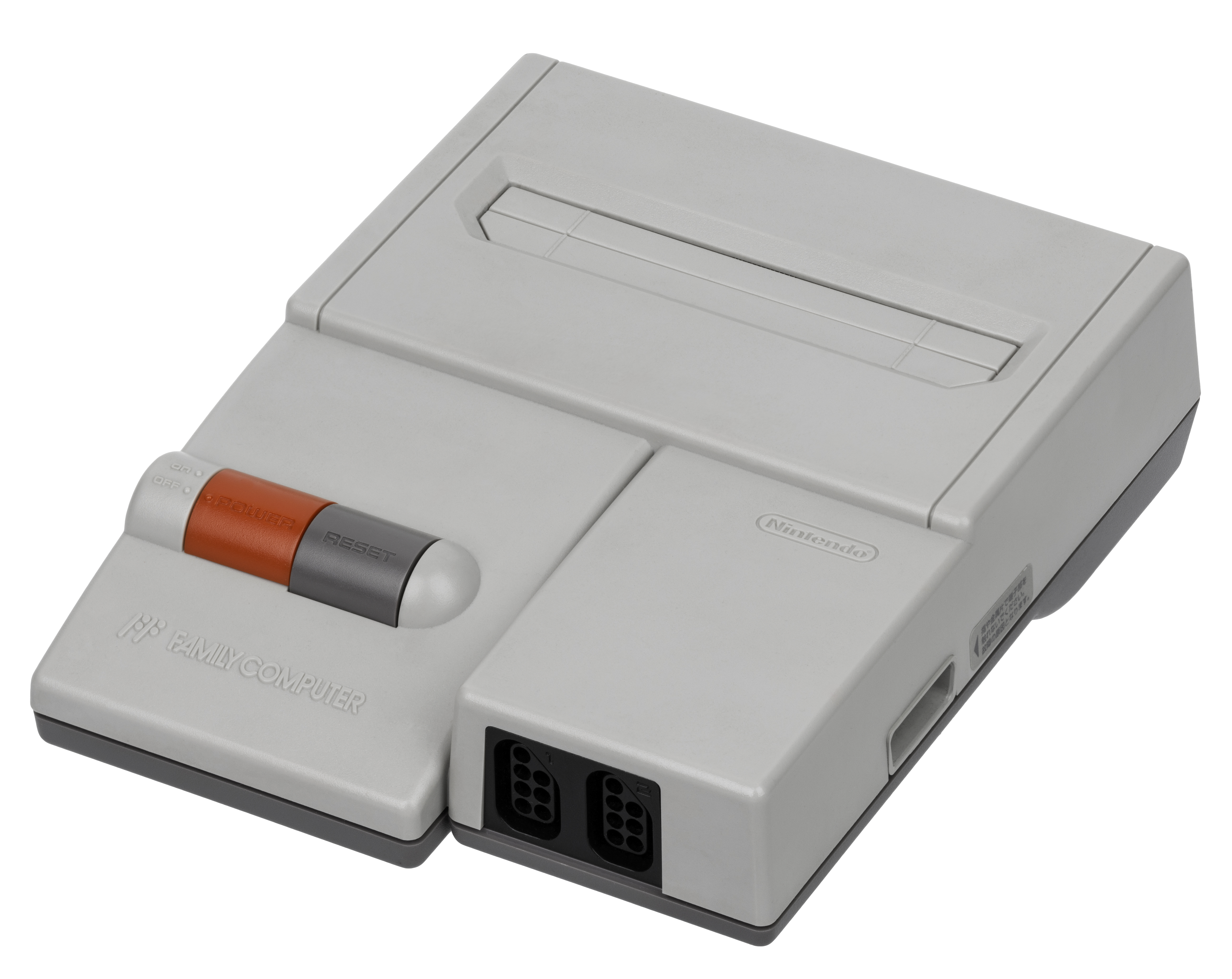
The redesigned NES (left, with controller) and Famicom models

The New-Style NES (Note: It is also known as the NES-101 (its model number), the New NES, the NES 2, the NES Basic, the NES Jr., and the top-loading model or variants of that name.) is a compact, cost-reduced, redesigned version of the Famicom/NES released by Nintendo in 1993. In Japan, it is officially called the New Famicom, (Note: Japanese: ニューファミコン, Hepburn: Nyū Famikon) though it retains the "Family Computer" branding to maintain consistency with the original Famicom. (Note: It is also commonly known as the AV Famicom (AV仕様ファミコン, Eibui Shiyō Famikon).) Unveiled in North America via press release on October 11 and released later that month with a retail price of US$49.95 (equivalent to $110 in 2025), the new design was marketed virtually the same as the original model; the only difference was the presence of a "new design" mark on the packaging. It was sold in Japan starting on December 1 (delayed from the original release date of October 21) for ¥6,800 (equivalent to ¥7,740 in 2024). The redesign did not receive a release in Europe.

Redesigned by Lance Barr, the New-Style NES has a vertical cartridge slot to prevent reliability issues common with the spring-loaded mechanism in the original NES. The console removed the 10NES lockout chip, allowing it to play unlicensed games. The console also removed composite video output, leaving only RF output available on it; Nintendo later produced a rare version of the console that replaced RF with the AV "multi-out" port used on the SNES. Although a game was not bundled with the New-Style NES, it came packaged with a redesigned controller modeled after the SNES controller; colloquially called the "dog bone" controller due to its resemblance in shape to one, it also retailed separately for US$14.99 (equivalent to $30 in 2025) each.

The New Famicom is similar in appearance to the New-Style NES, though the former lacks the "bump" on the latter's cartridge slot to accommodate the shorter Famicom cartridges as well as the RAM Adapter for the Famicom Disk System. It was bundled with two "dog bone" controllers; while this allowed for easy replacement of defective controllers compared to the hardwired ones in the original Famicom, games that utilized the microphone in the original Famicom's second controller are incompatible with the New Famicom due to the lack of one in the new controller. Although the New Famicom included composite video output, an improvement over the RF-only Famicom, it did not come bundled with an AV cable or an AC adapter (they were sold separately) as Nintendo assumed that prospective customers were in possession of a Super Famicom and could use the cables intended for that system instead.

An earlier redesign prototype, named the Famicom Adapter, (Note: Japanese: ファミコンアダプター, Hepburn: Famikon Adaputā) was shown alongside the Super Famicom (Note: Japanese: スーパーファミコン, Hepburn: Sūpā Famikon) when the latter was unveiled to the Japanese press on November 21, 1988; like the New Famicom, it functioned similarly to an original Famicom but included AV output instead of RF modulation. The Super Famicom was not backward compatible with Famicom games; Nintendo promoted the Famicom Adapter as an alternative method, but the Super Famicom acted more as an AV passthrough device rather than an emulator, with a switch included on it to shift between the Famicom and Super Famicom outputs. Despite the hardware incompatibility, the prototype Super Famicom controllers were compatible between the two consoles. The Famicom Adapter ultimately never went into production as conceived, with the concept superseded by the New Famicom.

The New-Style NES was produced until it was discontinued in August 1995. The New Famicom was discontinued in September 2003 along with the Super Famicom Jr. due to part scarcity, marking the official end of Famicom/NES production; the disk rewriting service for the Famicom Disk System was also terminated at the same time. The last Famicom was kept by Nintendo and loaned to the organizers of Level X, a game exhibition held from December 2003 to February 2004 at the Tokyo Metropolitan Museum of Photography, for a Famicom retrospective in commemoration of the console's 20th anniversary.

== Sharp-produced variants ==
=== Sharp C1 ===
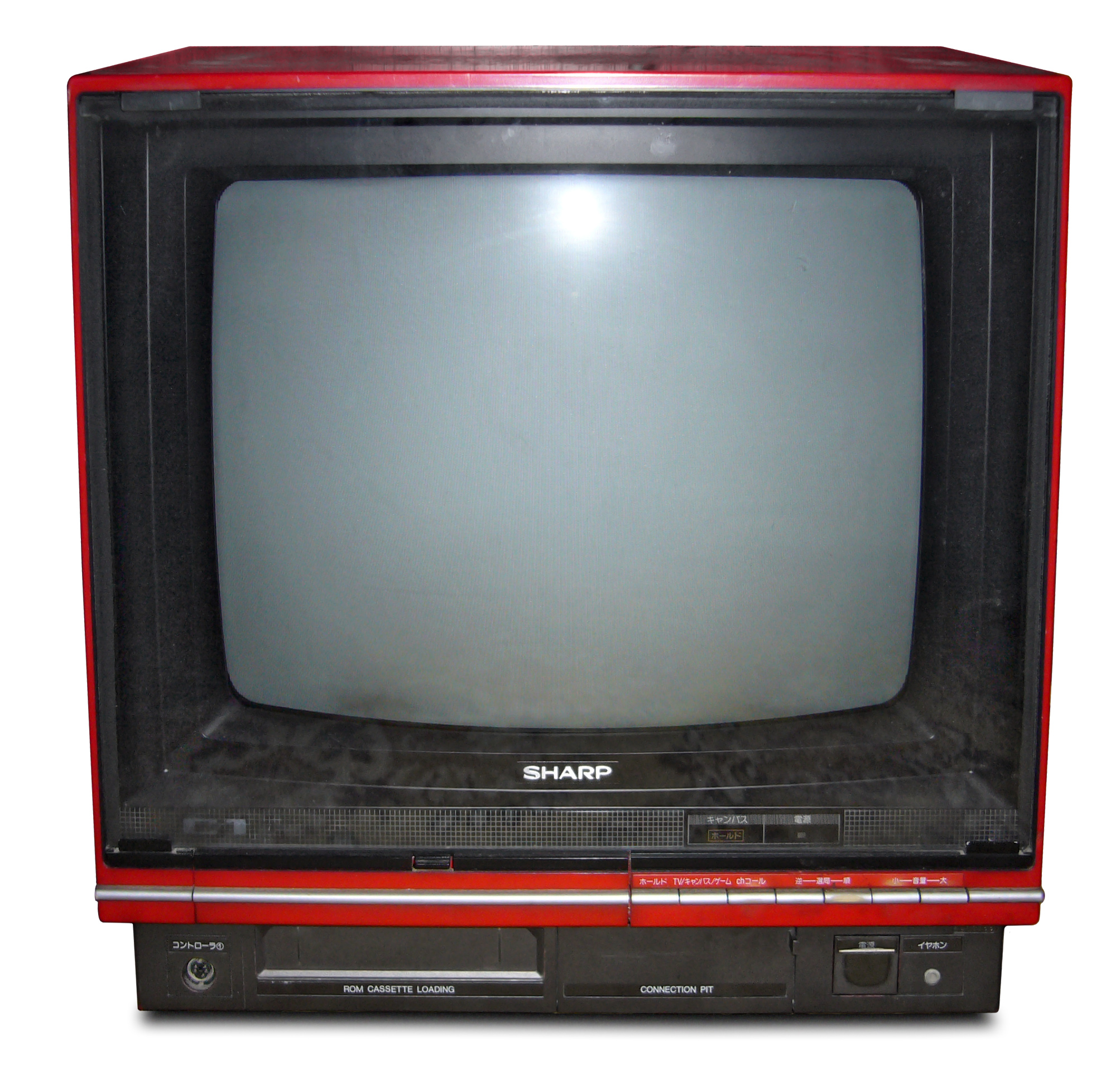
The Japanese 14-inch model of the Sharp C1

The Sharp C1, often described as the C1 Famicom TV, is a CRT television with a built-in Famicom that was produced by Sharp under license from Nintendo. It was originally released in Japan in October 1983 as the My Computer TV; (Note: Japanese: マイコンピュータテレビ, Hepburn: Mai Konpyūta Terebi) it was also distributed in Taiwan via Sampo as the Sampo C1 starting in 1984. The C1 is notable for having provided the high-quality screenshots displayed in video game magazines of the period, as it had a better picture quality than a Famicom or NES paired with a separate television due to its direct internal display connection.

In Japan, the TV was sold in two sizes; initially released as a 14-inch model for ¥93,000 (equivalent to ¥125,610 in 2024) MSRP on October 4, 1983, a 19-inch model was subsequently released on October 25 for ¥145,000 (equivalent to ¥195,840 in 2024) MSRP. The TV was also available in two colors: a black and red model, and a light silver and red model.

The Japanese systems feature two built-in programs, JR GRAPHIC and TV NOTE, and they were additionally shipped with a multicart containing versions of Donkey Kong Jr. and Donkey Kong Jr. no Sansuu Asobi. At the time of its release, this cartridge was unique to the C1 and represented one of the few licensed multicarts made for the Famicom. The Japanese systems also feature detachable controllers with unique round connectors.

The concept was followed up in Japan by the Super Famicom-based SF1 on December 5, 1990.

=== Sharp Nintendo Television ===
The Sharp Nintendo Television is a CRT television with a built-in NES that was produced by Sharp under license from Nintendo.

The unit was showcased at the Summer CES in 1987 with a release in the United States intended for later that year, but it was not released there until 1989 as the Game Television. When the TV was released in the U.S., only a black 19-inch model was made available at a retail price of US$798.99 (equivalent to $2,080 in 2025); it was later sold for US$436.99 (equivalent to $1,080 in 2025) at Kmart.

=== Twin Famicom ===
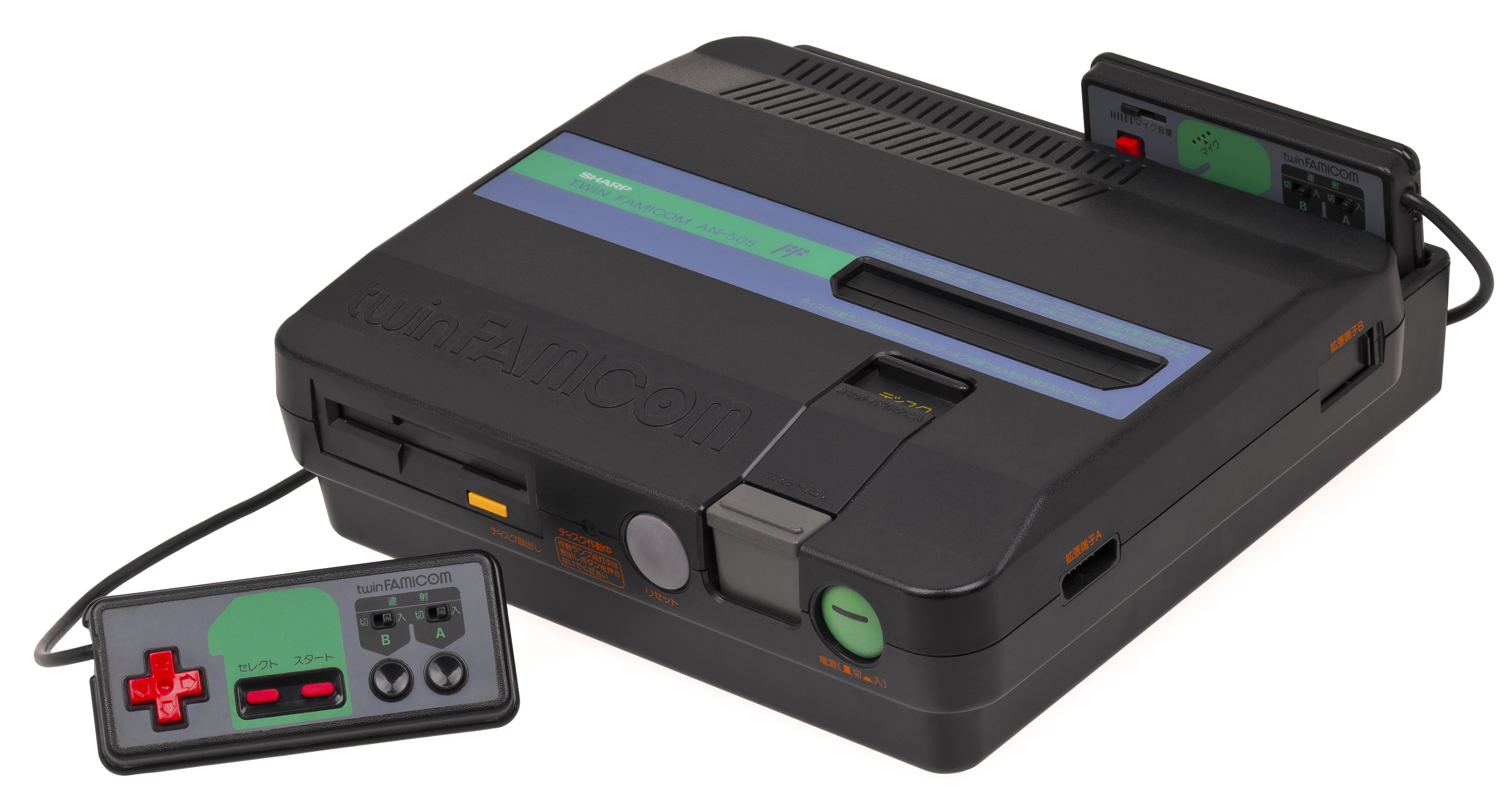
The second version of the Twin Famicom in black (AN-505-BK)

The Twin Famicom (Note: Japanese: ツインファミコン, Hepburn: Tsuin Famikon) is a home video game console produced by Sharp. It was exclusively released in Japan on July 1, 1986, at an introductory price of ¥32,000 (equivalent to ¥41,130 in 2024). The Twin Famicom is a licensed Nintendo product that combines the Famicom and the Famicom Disk System into a single piece of hardware. Whereas the standard Famicom only has one color combination, the Twin Famicom was initially sold in two colors: red with black highlights (AN-500R), and black with red highlights (AN-500B). A second version of the system was released in 1987 with a slightly different case design, turbo controllers, and two different color schemes; black with green highlights (AN-505-BK) and red with beige highlights (AN-505-RD).

The basic parts of the Twin Famicom include a slot for Famicom cartridges, a slot for the Disk System's floppy disks (called "Disk Cards"), a switch located right below the cartridge slot to switch between the two formats, a power button, a reset button, and an eject button, while the back of the console has slots for controller storage. The Twin Famicom has the expansion port present in other Famicom variations that allows additional peripherals to be connected to the console; it is located on the right side of the console and labeled "Expansion Terminal A" (拡張端子A, Kakuchō Tanshi A). The console also features three additional expansion ports; port "B" is located to the right of port "A", while ports "C" and "D" are located on the bottom rear, hidden by a removable cover. However, unlike port "A", no known existing peripherals use them.

The Twin Famicom generates an NTSC signal, but outputs composite video and monophonic audio via RCA connectors instead of using an RF modulator, allowing for greater audiovisual quality on TVs and monitors with such inputs; such connections were rare in Japan when it was released. An external RF modulator is bundled with the unit for connection through a TV's antenna/cable input. Like the original Famicom, the Twin Famicom also features two gamepads, both of which are hardwired into the console.

=== Famicom Titler ===
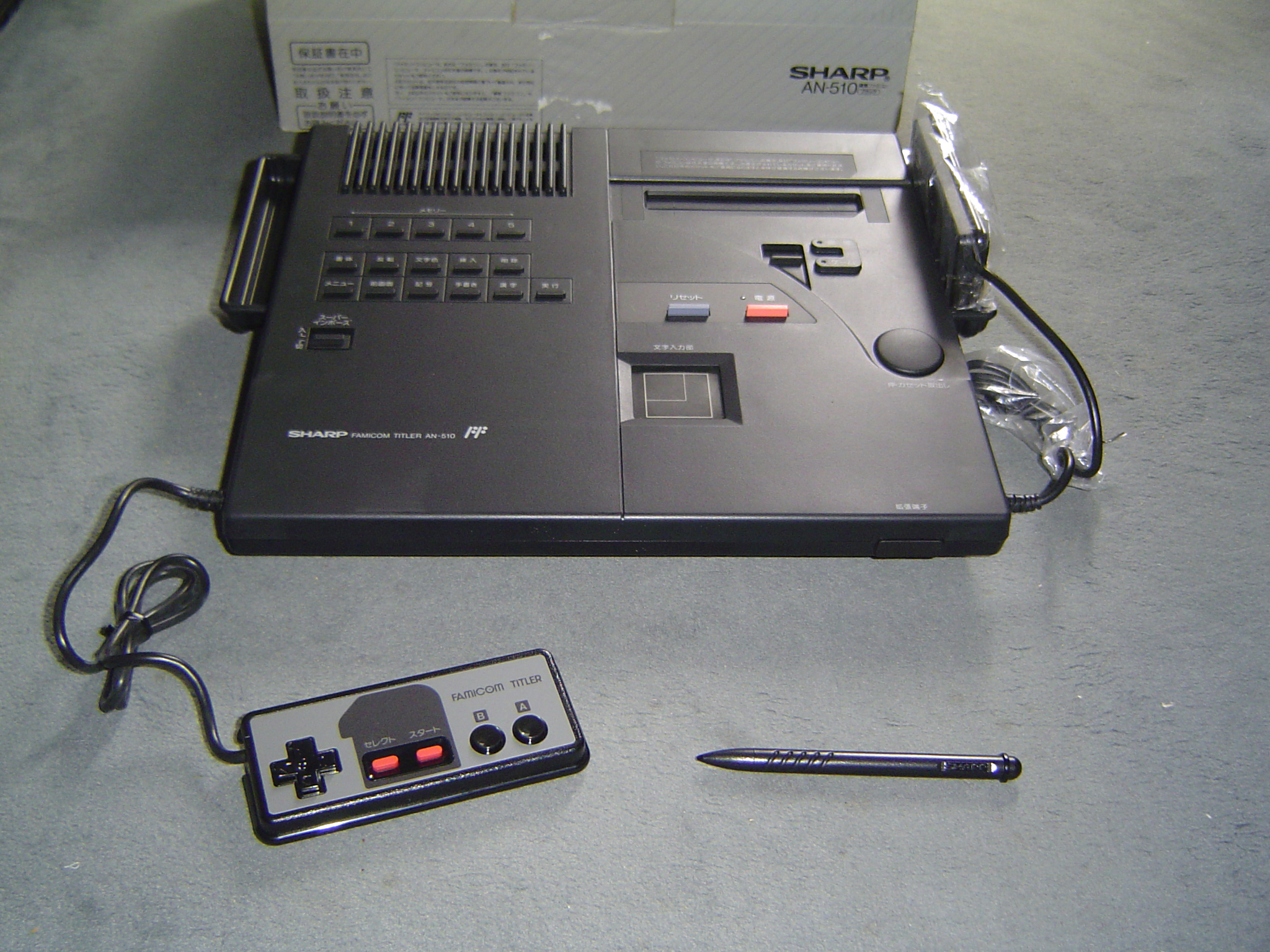
Famicom Titler

The Famicom Titler, (Note: Japanese: ファミコンタイトラー, Hepburn: Famikon Taitorā) also known as the Famicom Editor, (Note: Japanese: 編集ファミコン, Hepburn: Henshū Famicom) is a Famicom-based home video game console produced by Sharp Corporation under license from Nintendo in 1989. The console, released exclusively in Japan at a retail price of ¥43,000 (equivalent to ¥53,640 in 2024), was the most technologically ambitious project that Sharp had attempted with the Famicom system, with Sharp identifying a need for capturing direct game footage from a Famicom at a time when doing so for any video game required specialized equipment. It is the only Famicom that was commercially available to internally generate RGB video, done via usage of a unique variant of the PPU chip capable of doing so, and this has been identified as responsible for markedly improved clarity of image over other Famicom models. It is also the only Famicom console to employ S-Video output, though composite video output is another option available on the system. The system additionally features a keyboard and pressure-sensitive touchpad, enabling users to produce subtitles directly on the screen during gameplay as well as perform other basic editing functions, while a microphone is present to enable video narration.

Although relatively obscure at the time of its release, the console has recently seen increased interest from fans, hackers/modders, and collectors on the secondary market. Apart from historical interest in the system, collectors are highly interested in the improved picture quality resulting from its internal RGB video generation, a feature shared only with the Nintendo VS. System and PlayChoice-10 arcade systems and Sharp C1 television combo; the Famicom Titler is recognized by collectors as a practical way to obtain such a system appropriate for modern television sets. The console is also popular within the modding community due to its ease of modification in outputting a true RGB signal.

== Arcade variants ==
=== Nintendo VS. System ===
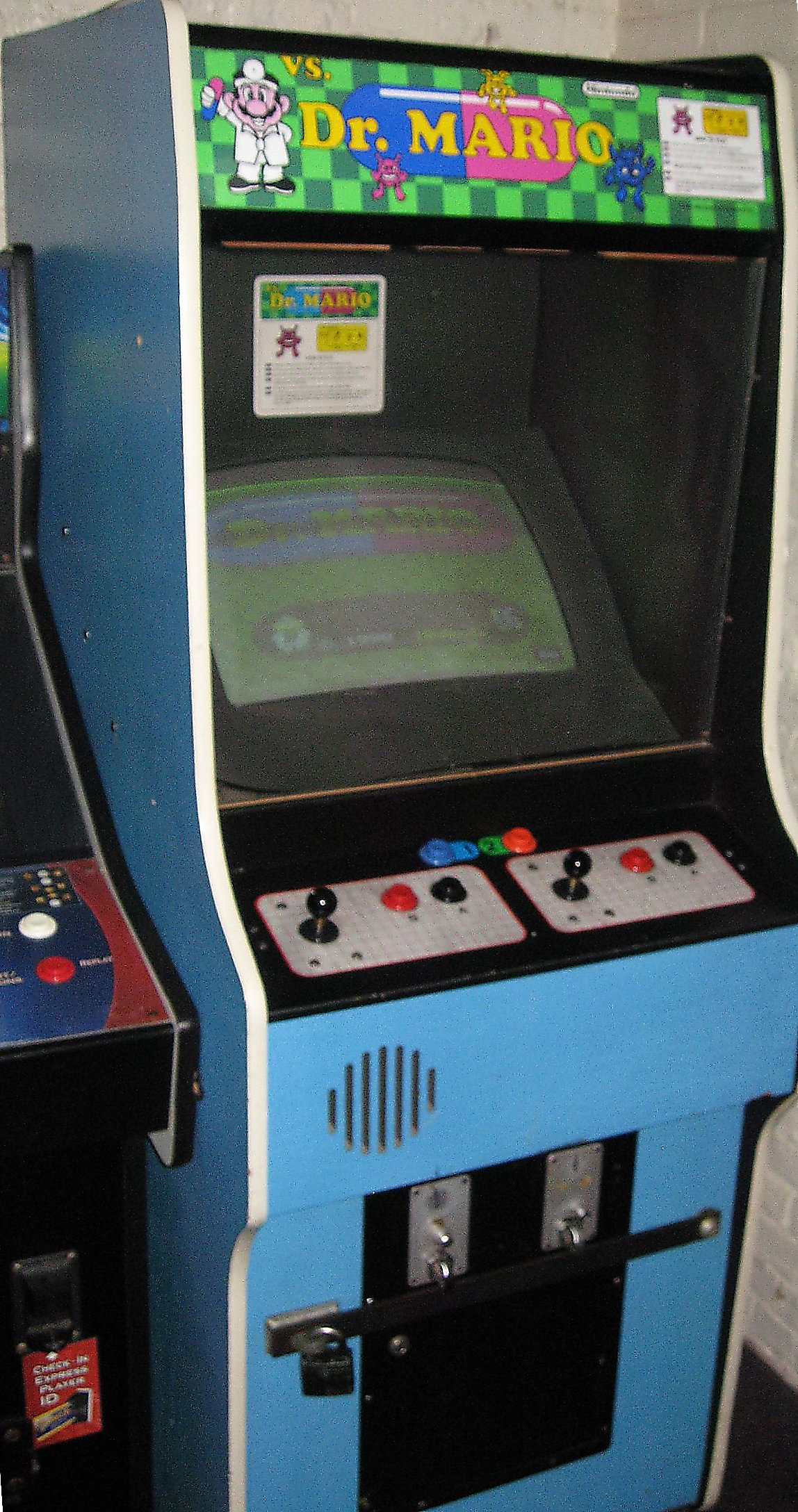
A VS. Dr. Mario cabinet

The Nintendo VS. System (Note: Japanese: 任天堂VS.システム, Hepburn: Nintendō Buiesu Shisutemu) is an arcade system developed and marketed by Nintendo. The system, introduced in March 1984 across the United States, Europe, and Japan with the release of Vs. Tennis, was intended as a successor to the Nintendo-Pak conversion kits used for games such as Mario Bros. and Donkey Kong 3; based on Famicom hardware, it was also designed as a way to introduce Famicom games to the general public in the United States without committing to a general release, which retailers were hesitant in doing so due to the lingering fallout from the video game crash the year before.

Two cabinet versions of the system were initially produced; collectively called the VS. DualSystem, both had dual-screen setups, with distinctions made between an upright and a sit-down version. The upright cabinet integrated two cabinets at an angle, whereas the sit-down cabinet, later called the VS. Table (and colloquially known as the "red tent"), placed screens on opposite ends; both cabinets ran on two motherboards (one for each screen) and could support up to four players. Complaints about the upright VS. DualSystem's size from operators led Nintendo to later introduce the VS. UniSystem in 1985, which used a more traditional upright cabinet and only one motherboard while including two control sets to support two-player games. While the VS. System's hardware was virtually similar to that of the Famicom, it included more random-access memory (RAM); utilizing the bank switching technique, games for the system could support more levels and features than their console counterparts. Swapping games was accomplished by replacing the existing game's read-only memory (ROM) chip with the one for the desired game. All cabinets could offer either two games, one for each screen, or one game programmed to handle multiplayer functionality across both screens.

The dual-motherboard cabinets retailed at $2,400, while the UniSystem cabinet retailed at under $2,000, with each game (called "VS.-Pak") sold for under $300. A UniKit conversion kit for older Nintendo arcade cabinets was released shortly after launch, with each kit sold for less than $1,000; Nintendo later demonstrated a similar kit for Pac-Man and Ms. Pac-Man cabinets in 1985. Despite misgivings between some industry insiders towards the VS. System's lackluster graphical power compared to its contemporaries, Nintendo achieved major success with the system in the United States through aggressive marketing tactics, selling more than 10,000 units by the end of 1984 alone; over 40 games were released for the system before it was discontinued in 1990. By the mid-1980s, about 100,000 VS. Systems had been sold to American arcades. However, Nintendo did not experience the same success in Japan; Uemura noted that Japanese players were wary about the system's emphasis on competitive gameplay. The VS. System was Nintendo's final arcade system in Japan, with the company withdrawing from the Japanese arcade market altogether in late 1985.

=== PlayChoice-10 ===
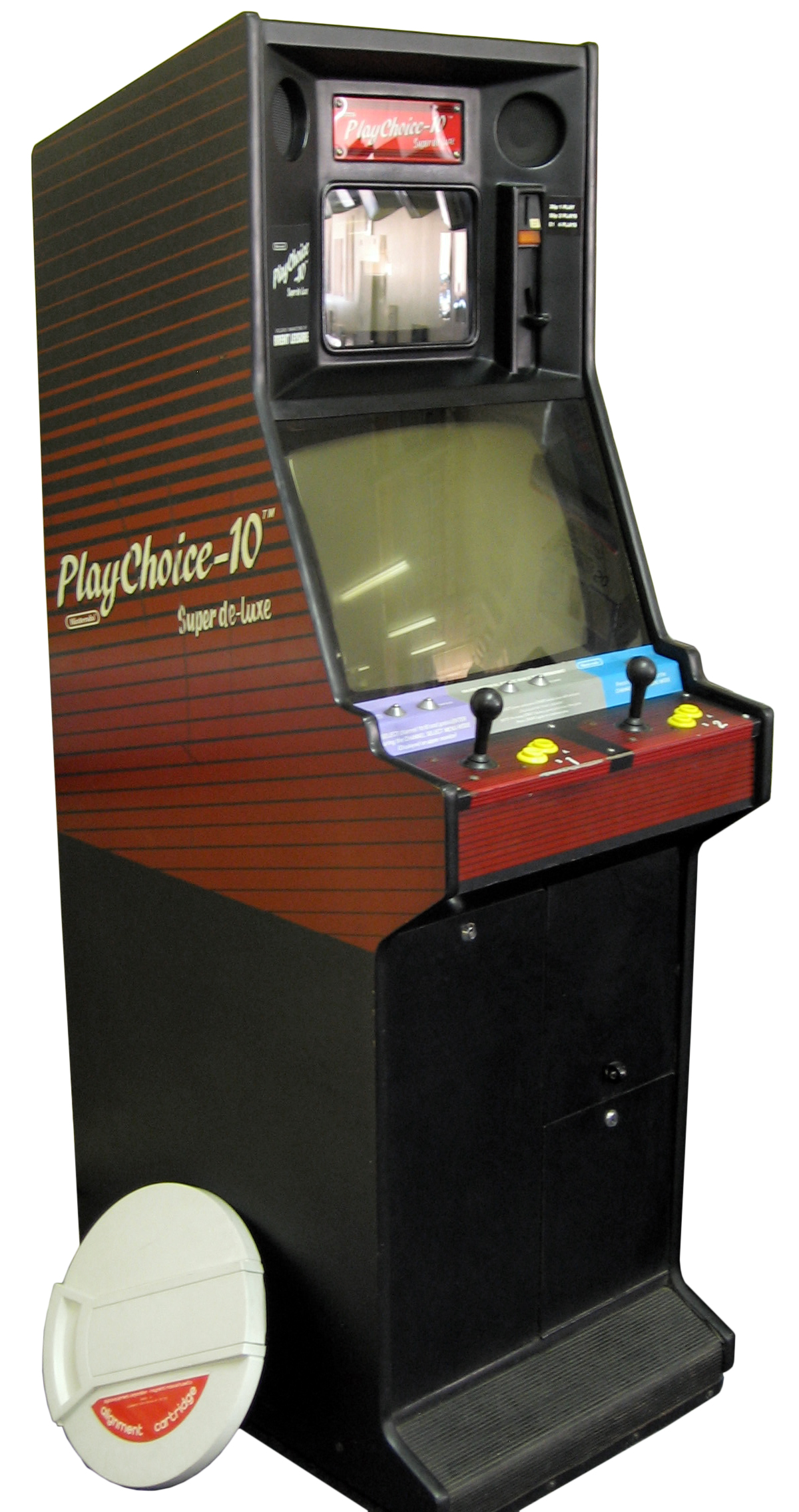
The "cabaret" version of the PlayChoice-10 arcade cabinet

The PlayChoice-10 is an arcade system developed and marketed by Nintendo. Released in August 1986 as the successor to the Nintendo VS. System, the PlayChoice-10 was developed as a means to showcase NES games while maintaining revenue from the arcade business; it did so by allowing players to test up to ten games, one at a time. The first games offered were Baseball, Tennis, Golf, Excitebike, Wild Gunman, Mario Bros., Super Mario Bros., Duck Hunt, Hogan's Alley, and Balloon Fight.

Two upright cabinet variants of the PlayChoice-10 were offered: a stacked dual-screen one and a single-screen one. A "cabaret" variant of the dual-screen cabinet, featuring a 9-inch screen on top of a 15-inch one instead of two 25-inch screens, was available in markets outside the United States. Conversion kits were also available for both dual-screen and single-screen formats, with the former intended for converting Punch-Out!! cabinets and the latter intended for converting standard Nintendo cabinets; the company later offered conversion kits for VS. UniSystem cabinets, with a five-game PlayChoice-5 kit made available alongside the standard ten-game kit. Nintendo additionally offered a countertop variant of the PlayChoice-10: the PlayChoice CounterTop System, which featured two control sets side-by-side. Games were distributed on printed circuit boards (PCBs) featuring ROM chips and were connected to the motherboard with edge connectors.

Gameplay is restricted to a set time limit, with two minutes available at minimum; inserting additional coins before play results in bonus session time (called "Prime Time") on top of the added time. Players are able to freely switch between games by pressing a button that invoked a game selection menu; they are also able to pause and reset the current game. Dual-screen cabinets displayed the selection menu and game instructions on the top screen and the gameplay on the bottom screen. The games themselves have minor differences compared to their console counterparts, with all of them including game instructions; some games had other differences, with Punch-Out!! using battery-backed memory to remember a player's initials for high scores.

Around 30,000 machines were made, with roughly 20,000 sold in North America and 6,000 sold in the United Kingdom. Canterbury Christ Church University professor Alan Meades reported that the PlayChoice-10 was popular with British pubs, with sales galvanized by the efforts of major brewery Allied Lyons to test the machines on-site.

There are 53 games that are confirmed to have released on the PlayChoice-10. Nintendo ultimately announced on July 31, 1992, that it would discontinue all of its arcade machines due to lack of profitability.

== Diagnostic variant ==
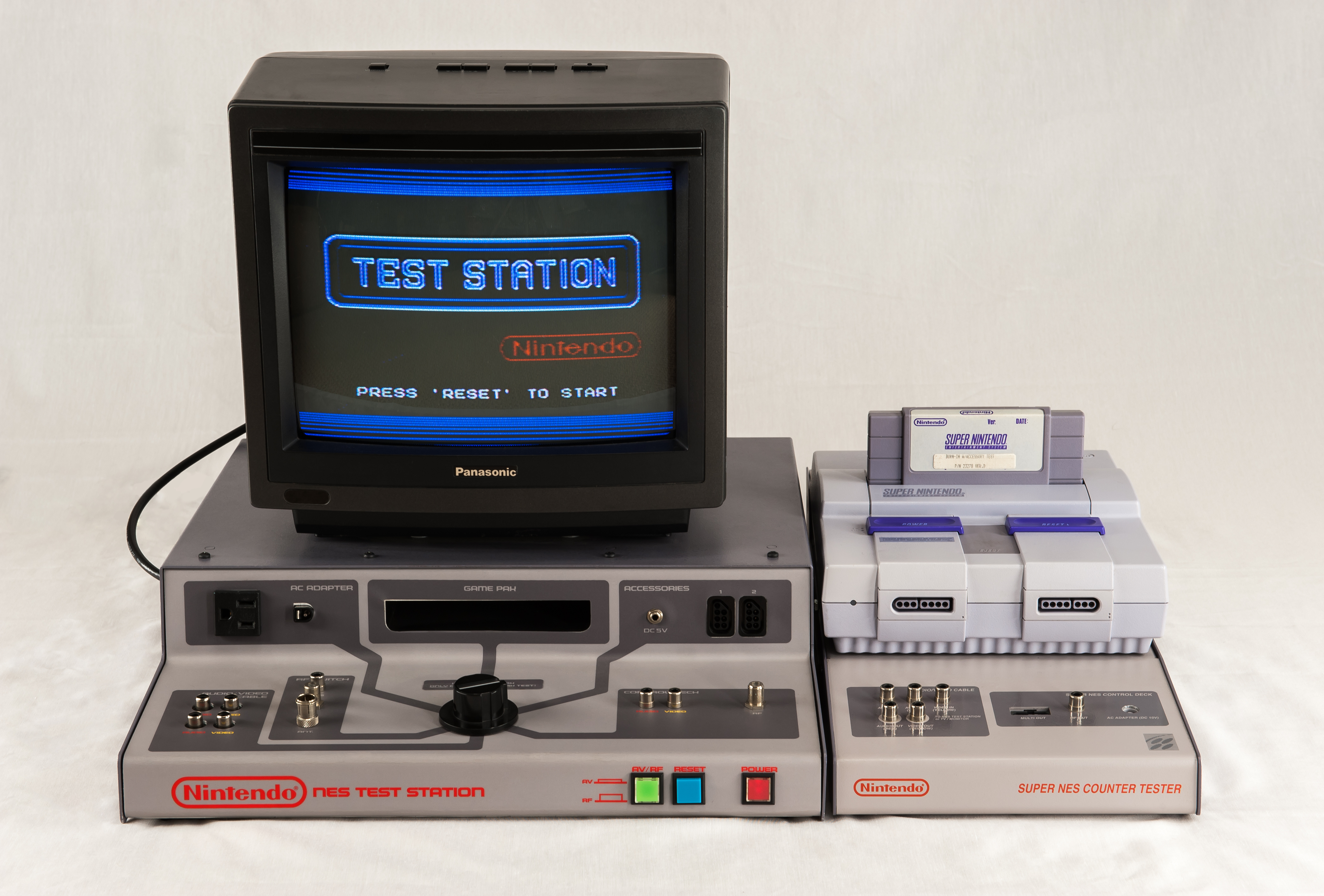
The Nintendo Test Station (left) and the Super NES Counter Tester

The Nintendo Test Station is a diagnostic device developed by Nintendo to test NES accessories. Intended for use in authorized service centers as part of the Nintendo World Class Service program (introduced in the May–June 1990 issue of Nintendo Power), the device can detect problems with AV cables, power supplies, and game controllers. A version of the device for the Super NES was initially produced as an extension to the NES version.

== See also ==
- Famiclone – unofficial hardware clones and variants of the system

== Bibliography ==
- Altice, Nathan (2015). I Am Error: The Nintendo Family Computer/Entertainment System Platform. MIT Press. ISBN 9780262028776. Archived from the original on January 11, 2020 – via Google Books.
- Horowitz, Ken (August 6, 2020). Beyond Donkey Kong: A History of Nintendo Arcade Games. McFarland. ISBN 9781476684208. Archived from the original on May 22, 2022 – via Google Books.
- Sheff, David (1999) [1993]. Game Over: Press Start To Continue – The Maturing of Mario. Wilton, Connecticut: GamePress. ISBN 9780966961706.
