= Sharp Corporation =

Japanese electronics company

- Logo since 1990

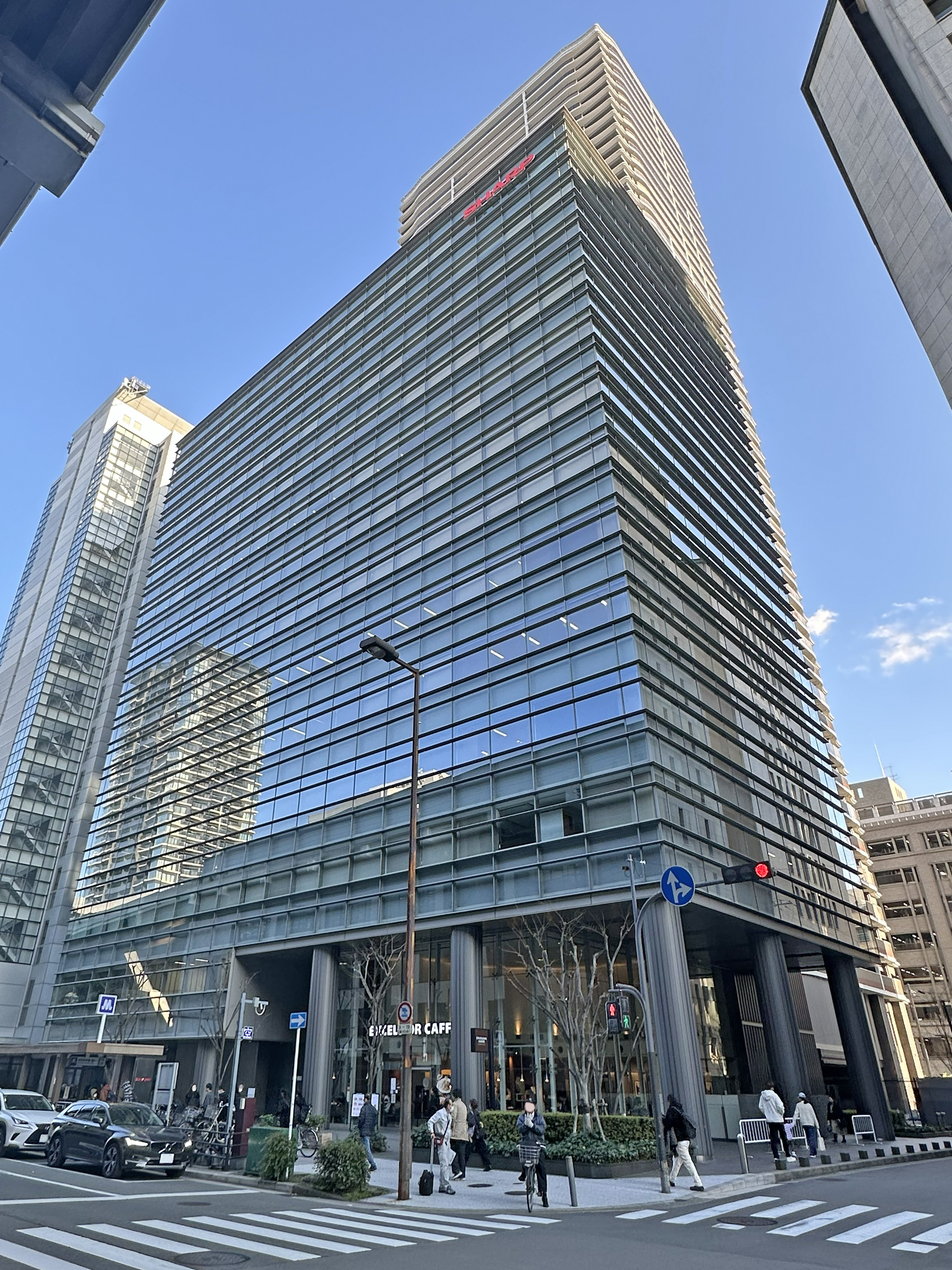
- Headquarters at Chūō-ku, Osaka Prefecture
- Native name: シャープ株式会社
- Romanized name: Shāpu kabushiki gaisha
- Formerly: Hayakawa Metal Works (1924–1942); Hayakawa Electric Industry Co., Ltd. (1942–1970); Sharp Electric Co. (spin-off) (1956–1967)
- Type: Public
- Traded as: TYO: 6753; Nikkei 225 Component
- Industry: Consumer electronics
- Founded: 15 September 1912; 114 years ago Tokyo, Japan
- Founder: Tokuji Hayakawa
- Headquarters: Chūō-ku, Osaka Prefecture, Japan
- Area served: Worldwide
- Key people: Po-Hsuan Wu (president and CEO); Masahiro Okitsu (Executive Vice President)
- Products: Televisions, audiovisual, home appliances, air conditioner, information equipment, ICs, solar cells, mobile phones, fax machines, electronic components, calculators, LCD panels, personal computers, pumps
- Revenue: ▼¥2.27 trillion (2020)
- Operating income: ▲¥52.77 billion (2020)
- Net income: ▲¥20.96 billion (2020)
- Total assets: ▼¥1.83 trillion (2020)
- Total equity: ▲¥364.59 billion (2020)
- Owners: Hon Hai Precision Industry Co., Ltd. (22.32%); SIO International Holdings Limited (13.23%); Foxconn (Far East) Limited (11.81%); Foxconn Technology Pte. Ltd. (9.96%)
- Number of employees: 46,206 (2023)
- Subsidiaries: Dynabook; Sharp NEC Display Solutions (66.0%) List: Sharp Marketing Japan; Sharp Energy Solutions; ScienBiziP Japan; Sharp Semiconductor Innovation; Sharp Fukuyama Laser; Sharp Cocoro Life; Sharp Display Technology; Sharp Sensing Technology; Sharp Electronics Corporation; Sharp Electronics of Canada; Sharp Corporation Mexico; Sharp Electronics (Europe) Limited; Sharp International Finance (U.K.); Sharp Electronics (Europe) GmbH; Sharp Middle East Free Zone Establishment; Sharp Universal Technology (Shenzhen); Shanghai Sharp Electronics; Sharp Hong Kong; Yantai Xiaye Electronics; Sharp (Taiwan) Electronics; Sharp Electronics (Malaysia); Sharp Singapore Electronics; Sharp Appliances (Thailand); Sharp Manufacturing (Thailand); Sharp Manufacturing Vietnam; Sharp Business Systems (India); Sharp Corporation of Australia
- Website: global.sharp sharpconsumer.com

Sharp Corporation (シャープ株式会社, Shāpu Kabushiki-gaisha) is a Japanese electronics company. It is headquartered in Sakai, Osaka, and was founded by Tokuji Hayakawa in 1912 in Honjō, Tokyō, and established as the Hayakawa Metal Works Institute in Abeno-ku, Osaka, in 1924. Since 2016, it is majority owned by the Taiwan-based manufacturer Hon Hai Precision Industry Co., Ltd., better known as Foxconn.

Sharp makes and has made throughout its history various different consumer electronic products, including kitchen appliances such as microwave ovens, cookers, washing machines and refrigerators; home appliances such as solar cells, vacuum cleaners, air purifiers dehumidifier and lighting; home and office devices such as printers, computer displays, TV sets, camcorders, VCRs, as well as calculators and various audio products such as radios, audio systems and wireless speakers.

Sharp's net sales reached 2.55 trillion yen in fiscal year 2022 (ending 29 February 2024), according to Statista. This represents a slight increase from the previous year's figure of 2.5 trillion yen.

== History ==
=== Early years 1912–1945 ===
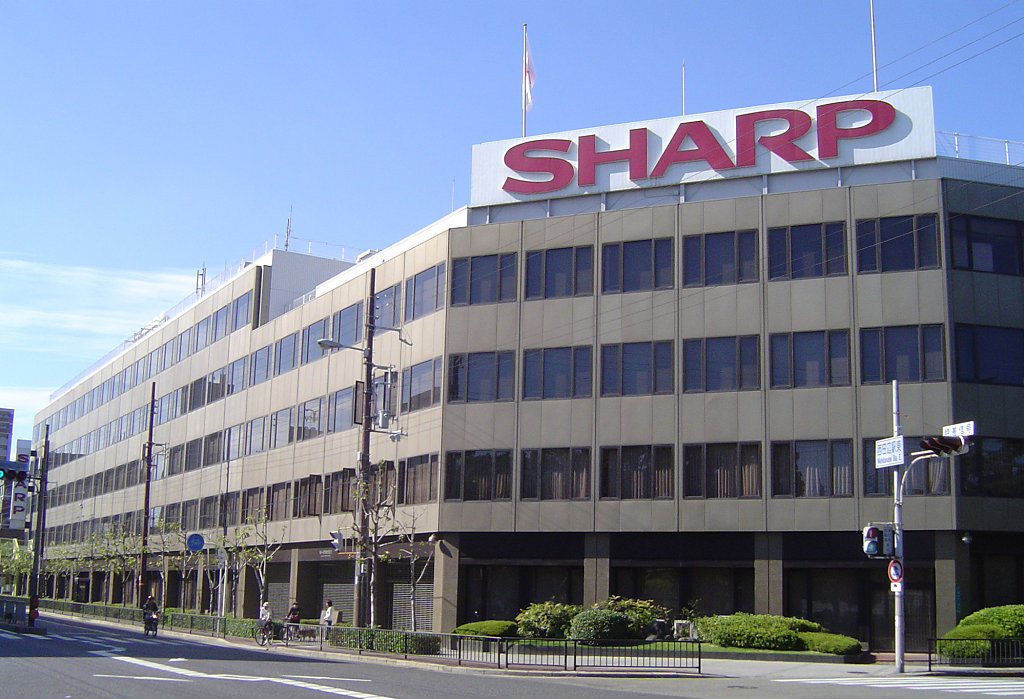
Sharp's former headquarters in Abeno-ku, Osaka

In 1912, Tokuji Hayakawa founded a metal workshop in Honjo, Tokyo. The first of his many inventions was a snap buckle named 'Tokubijo'. Another of his inventions was the Ever-Ready Sharp mechanical pencil in 1915. The product became one of the first internationally available mechanical pencils (while concurrent US design replaced it soon and became a modern type), and due to this big success the Sharp Corporation derived its name from it. After the pencil business was destroyed by the 1923 Great Kantō earthquake, the company relocated to Osaka and began designing the first generation of Japanese radio sets. These went on sale in 1925.

The company was established as "Hayakawa Metal Works" in 1924, in Tanabe-cho, Osaka. In 1942, the name was changed to "Hayakawa Electric Industry Company".

=== 1945–1999 ===
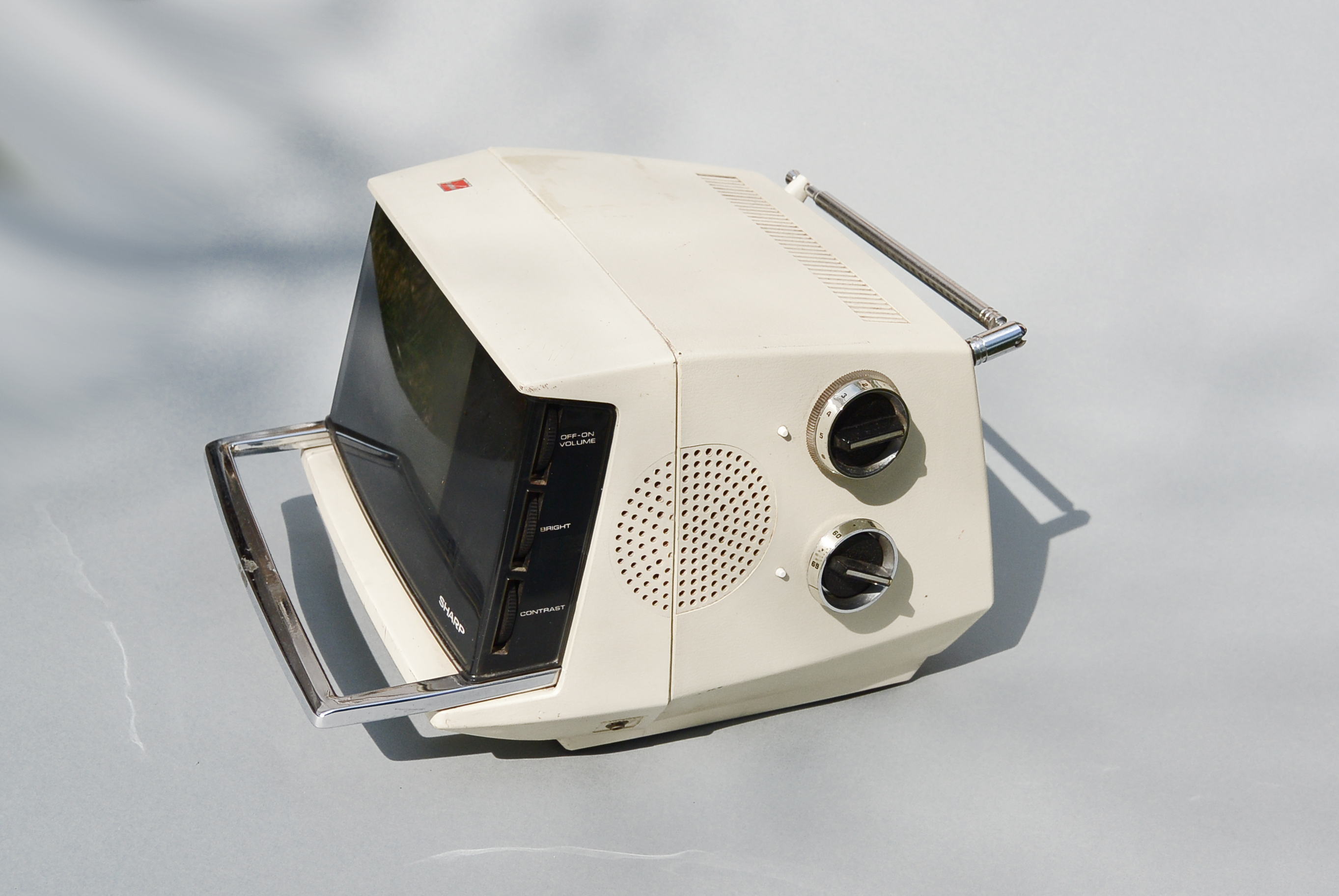
Sharp portable TV

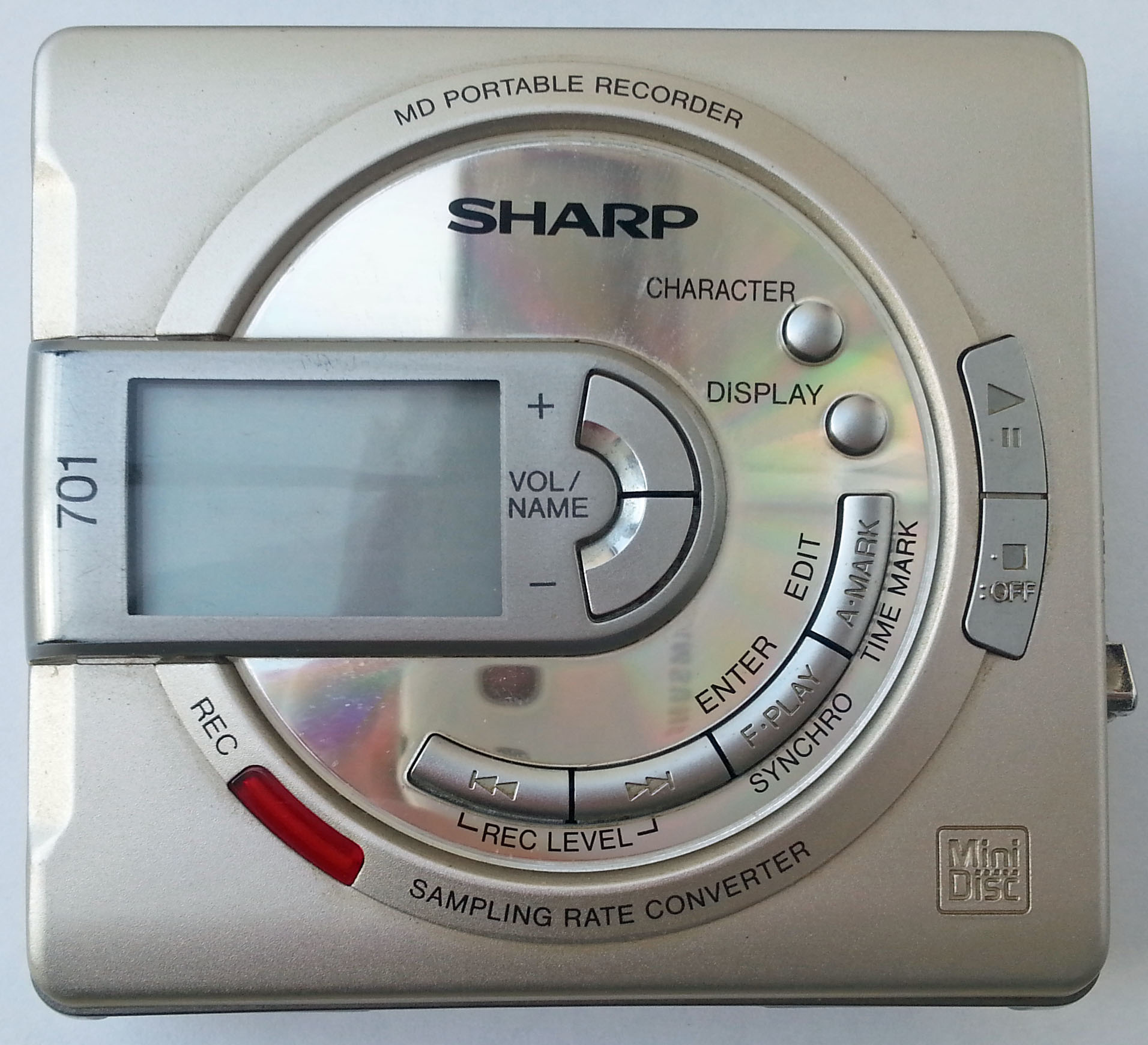
Sharp portable MiniDisc recorder

In 1953, Hayakawa Electric started producing the first Japan-made TV sets (the "Sharp TV3-14T").

In 1964, the company developed the world's first transistor calculator (the Sharp CS-10A), which was priced at JP¥535,000 (US$1,400). It took Sharp several years to develop the product as it had no experience in making computing devices at the time. Two years later, in 1966, Sharp introduced its first IC calculator using 145 Mitsubishi Electric-made bipolar ICs, priced at JP¥350,000 (about US$1000). Its first LSI calculator was introduced in 1969. This was the first pocketable calculator priced at less than JP¥100,000 (less than US$300), and turned out to be a popular item. Also in the same era the company introduced the first microwave oven with a turntable between 1964 and 1966. The company was renamed Sharp Corporation in 1970.

Sharp produced the first LCD calculator in 1973. Sharp had a working relationship with Nintendo during the 1980s, and was granted licensing rights for the manufacture and development of the C1 Famicom TV (1983), the Twin Famicom (1986), the Sharp Nintendo Television (1989), the Famicom Titler (1989), and the Super Famicom Naizou TV SF1 (1990). All of these units are considered collector's items on the secondary market. One of the company's main inventors of LCD calculators was Tadashi Sasaki.

In the 1970s and 1980s Sharp produced 8-bit home computers known as Sharp MZ and Sharp X1 based on Zilog Z80, and even a 16/32-bit gaming computer X68000 based on Motorola 68000. The PC (Pocket Computer) series of calculators produced by Sharp in the 1980s had BASIC programmability, and had full QWERTY keyboards, see Sharp PC-1500.

Sharp introduced low-cost microwave ovens affordable for residential use in the late 1970s. Sharp was known as a mass marketed electronics manufacturer, known for quality, durability and affordability, however Sharp ventured into the high end stereo market in 1976 with the introduction of high end receivers, amplifiers, speakers, turntables and cassette recorders. The Optonica line as it was called, consisted of high quality and technically advanced components, that was expanded in 1979, to cover a broader selection of high end equipment. During this run, Sharp introduced digital technology to some of the Optonica products, along with the traditional analogue products, and offered a complete selection of models ranging from low power high end receivers to very powerful models. The line was again changed, in 1981, and moved mainly into digital high end, complete stereo systems with advanced technological features setting the trend towards the digital age. The line was discontinued after 1981, but the Optonica line was again re-introduced in the late 1980s for a high end line of television receivers and higher quality mass market audio products such as VCRs, surround sound receivers, CD cassette boom boxes, and portable cassette players.

The first low-priced fax machine was introduced by the company in 1984 selling about 80 thousands only in US that year

The first wall-mountable TV was introduced by Sharp in 1992.

=== 2000–2012 ===
Sharp's Mobile Communications Division created the world's first commercial camera phone, the J-SH04, in Japan in 2000.

In the 2000s, Sharp heavily invested in LCD panel manufacturing plants: Kameyama in 2004, Sakai in 2009. This was combined with the launch of Aquos which kicked off the mass-market LCD television industry. The Sakai plant was for a while still the only 10th generation LCD manufacturing plant on the globe and its best fit for production of 60-inch or larger panels. However, the 2008 financial crisis and strong Yen (especially against Won) significantly lowered world demand for Japanese LCD panels. Furthermore, the switch to digital TV broadcasting was virtually completed in Japan by the middle of 2011. Via Japanese government issued coupons for digital TV sets, consumers were encouraged to purchase digital TV sets until March 2011. This hit the Japanese LCD TV market, reducing it almost by half from 2010. All of those events strongly hit Sharp's LCD business. As the result, the Sakai LCD plant suffered a reduced operating rate until Q3 2012.

In June 2005 Sharp produced the largest LCD television at the time, with a display of 65 inches. It went on sale in August 2005 in Japan. From 2005 to 2010 Sharp was the biggest mobile phone brand in Japan. Since then it has been constantly switching places through financial quarters against rivals Fujitsu, Apple and Sony. Sharp acquired a controlling stake in Pioneer Corporation in 2007. At CES 2007, Sharp introduced a prototype largest LCD TV, with a screen size of 108 inches. In July 2008 Sharp announced that the model will go into production for the Japanese market.

In 2008, Sharp collaborated with Emblaze Mobile on the Monolith, "…an ambitious project to design the ultimate holistic mobile device". The project was never brought to market. Key software developers were later picked up by other companies. On 25 June 2009, Sharp and Pioneer agreed to form a joint venture comprising their optical businesses, called "Pioneer Digital Design and Manufacturing Corporation". In 2010, Sharp stopped developing PCs to focus on tablets.

In 2012 Sharp unveiled the largest production TV at the time, with a screen size of 80 inches. It is part of the Aquos range and went on sale in Japan at around JP¥950,000.

=== 2012–present ===
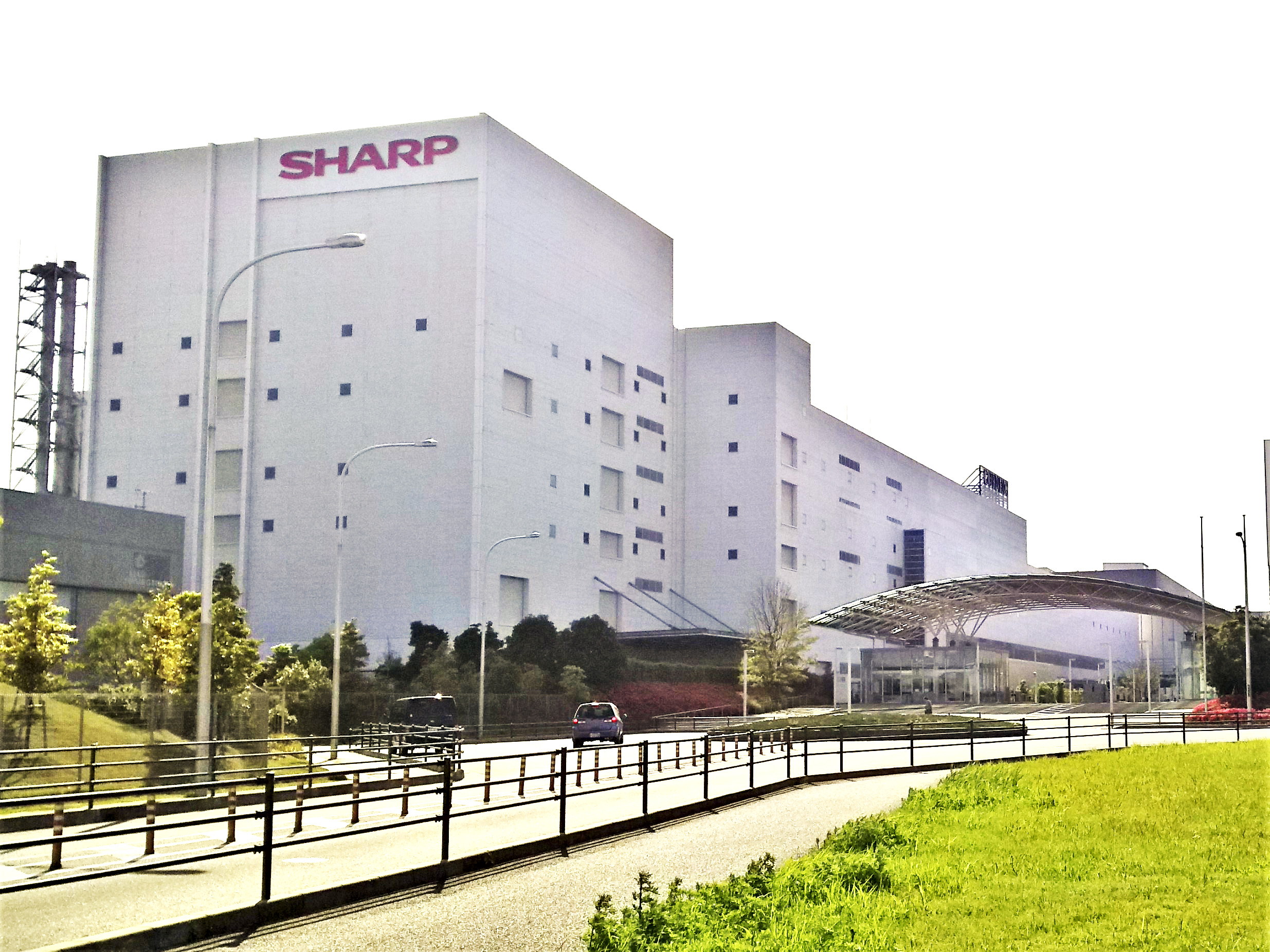
Sharp's former Headquarters at its factory in Sakai-ku, Sakai, Osaka Prefecture

2012 was the 100th anniversary for Sharp but it announced the worst financial record in its history, with a loss of JP¥376 billion (US$4.7 billion) in April 2012. In September, Sharp announced job cuts. In 2014, Sharp was able to stem losses and deliver a positive net income for its first quarter results.

In March 2012 the Taiwan-based electronics company Hon Hai, trading as Foxconn, agreed to acquire a 10% stake in Sharp Corporation for US$806 million, and to purchase up to 50 percent of the liquid-crystal displays produced at Sharp's plant in Sakai, Japan. In June 2012, Hon Hai chairman Terry Gou paid money for Sakai plant and got 50% ownership of the plant. However, since the announcement in March, Sharp's share price continued declining and reached JP¥192 on 3 August. Sharp deal's price was originally JP¥550 per share. Both companies agreed to renegotiate the share price, but they never came to an agreement.

Sharp led the market share of mobile phones in the Japanese market in April 2012. Sharp announced it accepted a US$100 million investment from Samsung in March 2013. In 2013 Sharp developed the most efficient solar cell, converting a record 44.4% of sunlight into electricity. In 2013, Sharp Corporation was the tenth-largest, by market share, television manufacturer in the world. In Japan it has been a long-time leader.

After years of huge losses in its overseas TV business, Sharp sold its Mexico TV factory to Chinese electronics manufacturer Hisense for $23.7 million in July 2015. The sale includes rights to use the Sharp brand name and all its channel resources in North and South America, except Brazil. This meant that Sharp has exited the TV market in the Americas (except Brazil). It was a sign showing Sharp's rapid decline in that market, where it once was one of the leading manufacturers for LCD TVs a decade earlier. Sharp's television market share in North America was 4.6% in 2015. However Sharp remains the biggest television brand in the Japanese market.

In October 2015 Sharp announced a smartphone that also works as a robot, called RoboHon. It would be sold in 2016 in Japan. Sharp began selling the world's first commercially available TV with a 8K resolution in October 2015. The 85-inch LV-85001 model costs JP¥16 million (US$133,000). Japanese public broadcaster NHK will have test broadcasts at 8K starting 2016, with regular services expected by the time of the Tokyo 2020 Olympics.

On 25 February 2016, Foxconn announced its intent to acquire a 66% controlling stake in Sharp for 700 billion yen (US$6.24 billion). However, the deal was briefly delayed due to unforeseen financial liabilities; on 30 March 2016, Foxconn announced that it had agreed to pay US$3.5 billion for the stake instead, Foxconn wished to use the purchase to expand into direct-to-consumer product sales rather than serving as a contract manufacturer. In September 2016 Sharp unveiled the Sharp INTELLOS Automated Unmanned Ground Vehicle (A-UGV) at the ASIS International 62nd Annual Seminar and Exhibits (ASIS 2016) in Orlando, Florida.

In March 2017, demolition of Sharp's former headquarters began. On 28 April 2017, Sharp turned its first operating profit in three years, citing the restructuring efforts by Foxconn. In June 2017, Sharp sued its Chinese licensee Hisense for damaging the reputation of its brand, seeking an exit from its licensing agreement. Sharp accused the company of producing "shoddily manufactured" televisions under the Sharp name, including products it believed were in violation of U.S. safety standards for electromagnetic radiation, and the subject of deceptive advertising over their quality. Hisense denied that it engaged in these practices, and stated that it planned to defend itself in court and "will continue to manufacture and sell quality televisions under the Sharp licensed brands." In February 2018, Sharp dropped the lawsuit against Hisense. In 2019 Sharp re-acquired its own brand for use on TVs in the US market. In March 2020, in response to the coronavirus pandemic, Sharp announced it would use a TV factory with high-end clean rooms to manufacture surgical masks. Sharp acquired the remaining shares of Dynabook from Toshiba in August 2020, making Dynabook Inc. a wholly owned subsidiary of Sharp. Sharp had first purchased Dynabook from Toshiba in 2018.

== Products ==
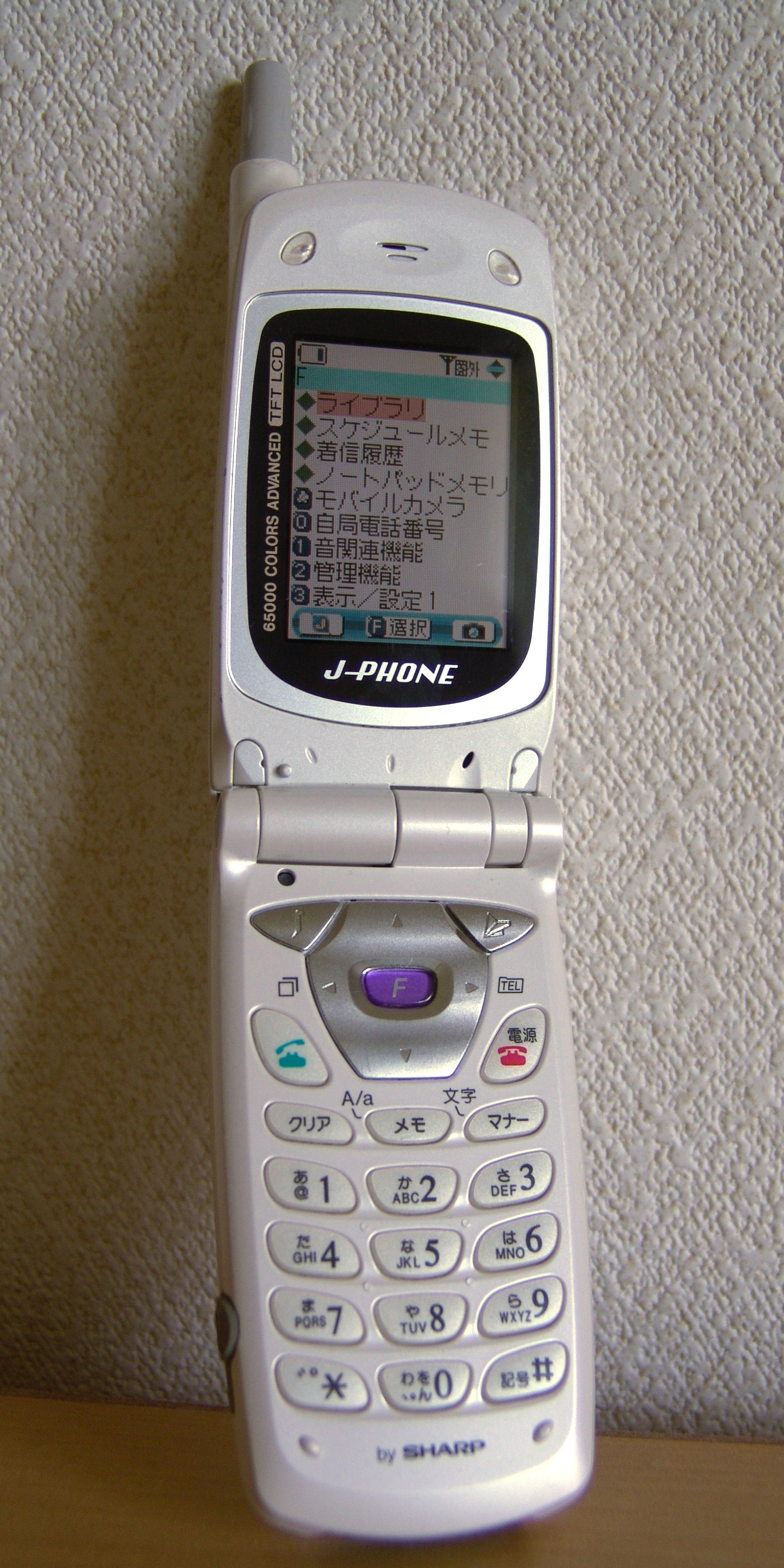
Sharp J-SH07 mobile phone, 2001 (Japanese market)

Core technologies and products include LCD panels, solar panels, mobile phones, audio-visual entertainment equipment, video projectors, Multi-Function Printing Devices, microwave ovens, air conditioners, air coolers, air purifiers, cash registers, CMOS and CCD sensors, and flash memory.

The first commercial camera phone was also made by Sharp for the Japanese market in November 2000. Recent products include the ViewCam, the Ultra-Lite notebook PC, the Zaurus personal digital assistant, Sidekick 3, and the AQUOS flat-screen television.

Sharp manufactures consumer electronic products, including LCD televisions, sold under the Aquos brand, mobile phones, microwave ovens, Home cinema and audio systems, air purification systems, fax machines and calculators.

For the business market, Sharp also produces projectors and monitors and a variety of photocopiers and Laser Printers, in addition to electronic cash registers and Point of sale technologies.

For the private security industry, Sharp produces an Automated Unmanned Ground Vehicle (A-UGV) named INTELLOS, which utilizes a navigation surveillance platform also developed by Sharp. The system combines automation, mobility, and a variety of monitoring and detection capabilities to extend the impact of a traditional security force.

Sharp Solar is a supplier of silicon photovoltaic (PV) solar cells, and offers a solar TV. In Q1 2010, the company made the highest revenues from production of solar PV systems.

For the corporate meeting room market, Sharp was the first company to bring the Windows collaboration display to market, which is a 70-inch interactive display with built-in unified communication equipment and an IoT sensor hub for measuring environmental room conditions. The Windows collaboration display is conceived to be seamlessly compatible with Microsoft's Office productivity products, as well as make use of the Microsoft Azure cloud services with the IoT sensor hub generated data.

== Operations ==
=== Japan ===
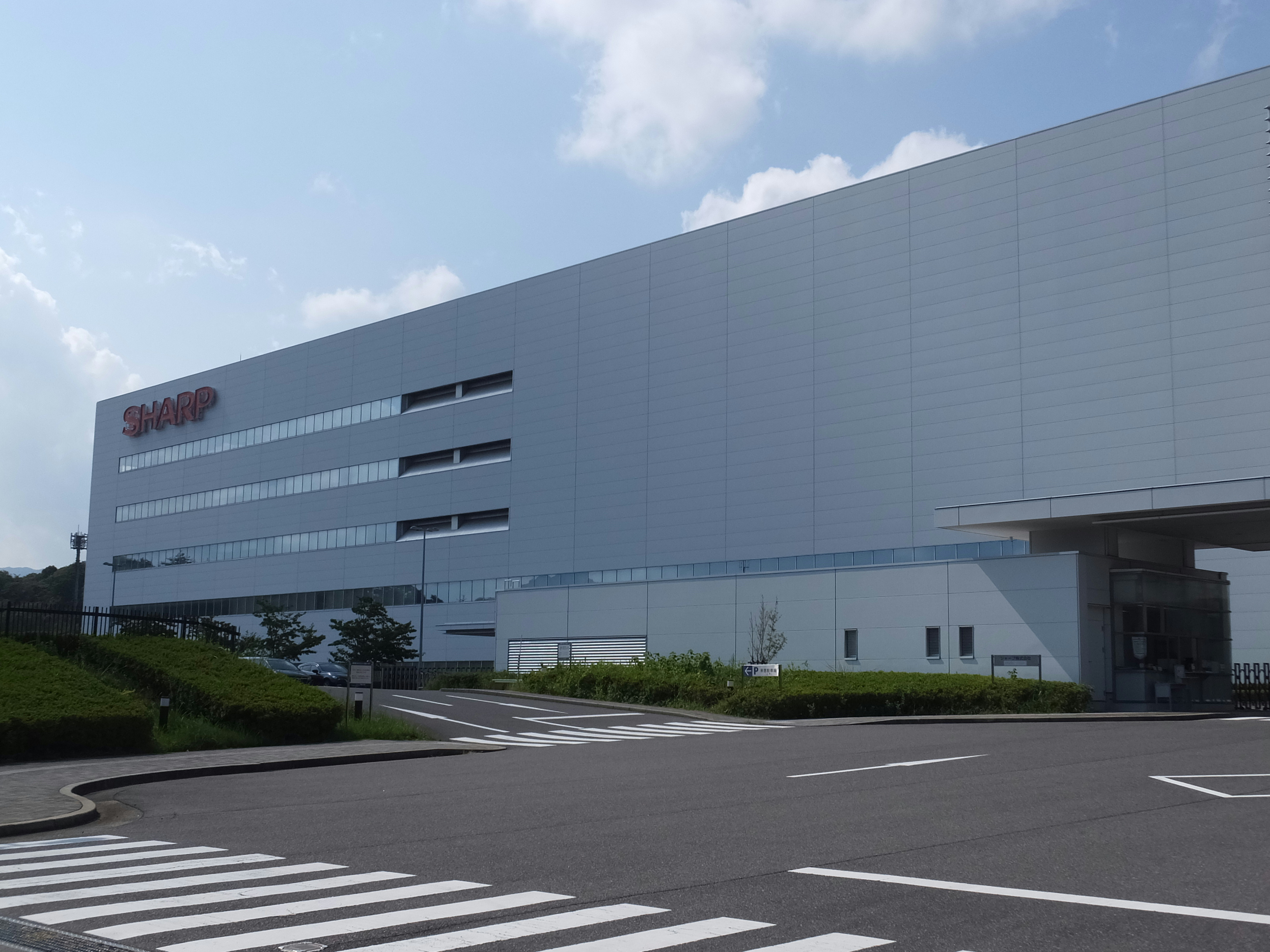
The Sharp factory in Kameyama, Mie, Japan

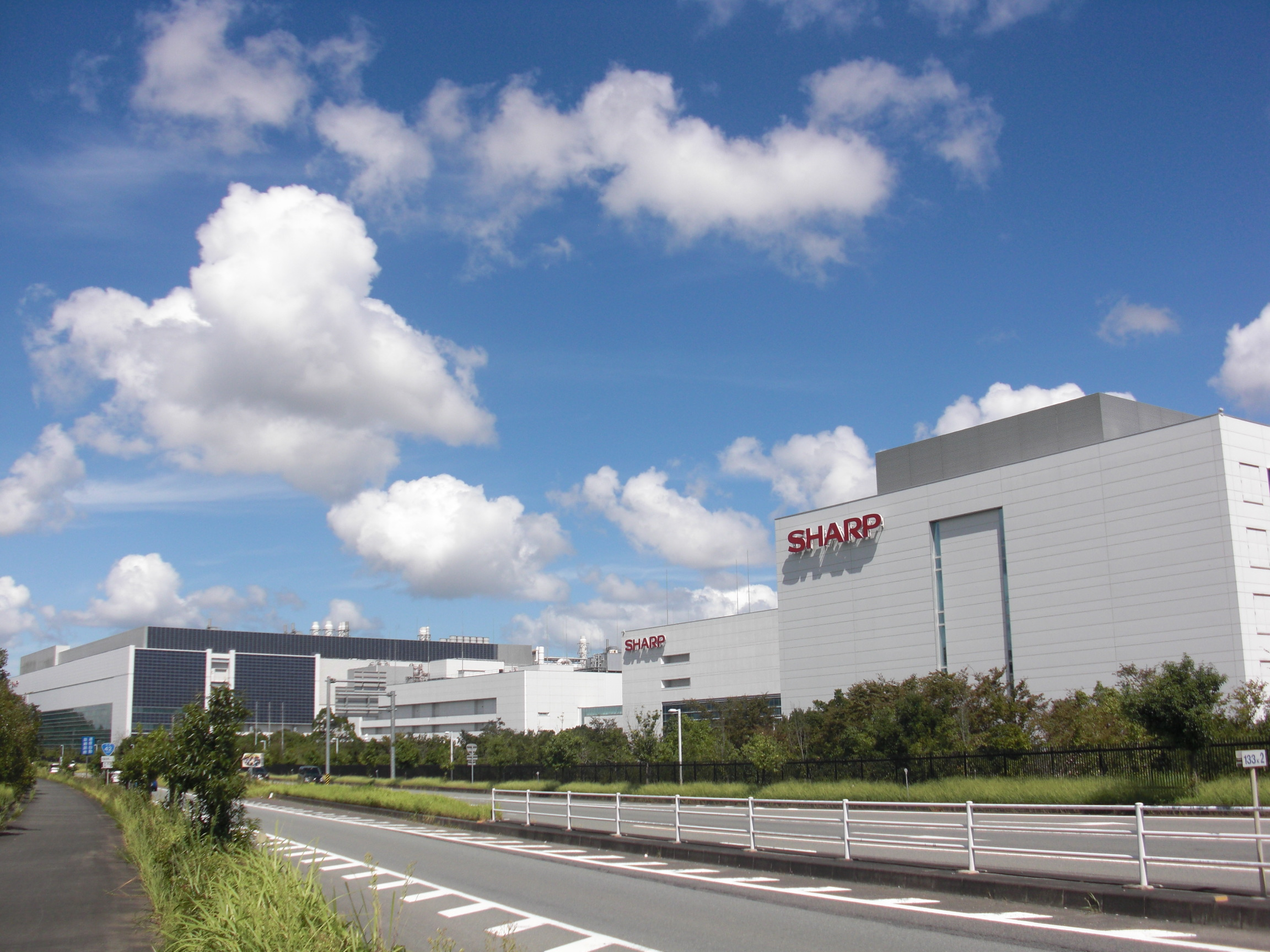
The Sharp factory in Taki, Mie, Japan

Net sales for the year 2003 were $16.8 billion. The corporation employs 46,600 staff, of which around half live outside Japan.

It operates from 64 bases in 30 countries and its products are distributed in 164 countries worldwide. Many of its regional subsidiaries trade under the name Sharp Electronics. Sharp was among the Top 100 R&D Spenders in a list published by the IEEE Spectrum magazine in 2002. Sharp's headquarters are at 1 Takumi-chō, Sakai-ku, Sakai, Japan. Until the relocation to Sakai in 2016, the headquarters were in Abeno-ku, Osaka where Hayakawa restarted the business in the 1920s.

=== Europe ===
In 2007 Sharp opened a LCD manufacturing plant in Poland. The plant initially manufactured LCD modules using LCD panels imported from Sharp Japan.

In September 2014, Sharp announced that Slovak electronics company UMC (Universal Media Corporation /Slovakia/ s.r.o.) was acquiring an exclusive brand licence from Sharp and its European television and audio business UMC will also acquire Sharp's Polish factory. As part of the deal, Sharp will support the design and development of televisions sold by UMC under the Sharp brand.

The same month, Sharp also announced a tie-up with Vestel in Europe for white goods. Vestel will sell Sharp-branded white goods (except air conditioners), such as refrigerators and microwave ovens manufactured by Sharp in Thailand and China. Sharp will also license its brand name to Vestel for volume home appliances such as refrigerators, washing machines and ovens. Sharp's remaining European business will then focus on the business-to-business sector including multi-function printers and energy services.

In 2017 Sharp acquired a majority (56.7%) shareholding in Skytec UMC, which included the UMC Poland factory.

=== Factories ===
- Poland : Sharp Manufacturing Poland Sp. z o.o., in Toruń, Poland (Europe)
- Indonesia : Sharp also has a refrigerator manufacturing facility in Karawang, Indonesia, established 2014.
- Malaysia : Sharp has an export-only Television factory at the HICOM Industrial Park in Shah Alam, Selangor. This plant manufactures television sets for export only to North America. Sharp also has two domestic appliances plant – the Batu Pahat plant in Johor that manufactures audio-visual Equipment like television sets and Blu-Ray players, and the Sungai Petani plant in Kedah that manufactures radios as well as kitchen appliances like blenders and rice cookers. Formerly there was a plant in Petaling Jaya that manufactured television sets, VCRs, microwave ovens, washing machines and refrigerators, this plant was hit badly by the 1997 Asian financial crisis and shut down as Sharp moved the productions of the appliances to either Batu Pahat (TVs and VCRs) or Sungai Petani (microwave ovens), or out of the country altogether (refrigerators and washing machines) in a bid to reduce operating costs.
- United States : Sharp Manufacturing Company of America (SMCA) in Memphis, Tennessee – established in 1979 to produce color televisions and microwave ovens, it later began producing personal computers in the late 1980s; the plant assembles about 1 million color televisions and 900,000 microwave ovens annually as of 1989. The Memphis plant made 77,000 color televisions and 18,000 microwaves in its first year of production.
- (former) Mexico : LCD plant (Sharp Electrónica Mexico S.A. de C.V. SEMEX) – established as a color CRT TV plant in 1997; began LCD production in 2003; a second LCD plant on site was opened in 2007. The facility and rights to use the Sharp brand on TVs in North America was sold to Hisense in 2015.

== Controversies ==
=== Antitrust law violations ===
==== United States ====
On 8 November 2008, the United States Department of Justice announced that Sharp had agreed to pay $120 million (United States Dollar) as a criminal fine. According to the announcement, Sharp participated in conspiracies to fix the price of TFT LCD panel for Dell's computer monitors and laptops (2001–2005), Motorola's Razr phones (2005–2006) and Apple's iPod (2005–2006).

==== Japan ====
On 18 December 2008, Japan Fair Trade Commission ordered Sharp to pay JP¥261 million (US$3 million) as criminal fine. According to the order, Sharp and Hitachi Display participated in the conspiracies to keep the price for TFT LCD panels for Nintendo DS and DS-Lite. The fine for Hitachi Displays was waived by JFTC leniency program.

However, Sharp disagreed with the JFTC order and announced it would begin an appeals procedure against it on 2 February 2009. On 31 July 2013, the JFTC dismissed Sharp's appeal.

=== Environmental record ===
In November 2011, Sharp was ranked in 11th place by Greenpeace's re-launched Guide to Greener Electronics that ranks 15 electronics manufacturers according to their policies and practices to reduce their impact on the climate, produce greener products, and make their operations more sustainable. Greenpeace summarizes the corporation's environmental record thus: "Sharp supports a new renewable energy law in Japan but scores poor on all sustainable operations criteria".

Sharp scored 3/10 and received most of its points on the Products criteria where the company was praised for the energy efficiency of its products with all of its TVs meeting the latest Energy Star standard. It also gained some points for having a relative long term target to reduce CO_{2} emissions by two percent (per production unit) compared to the previous year, yet sets out no clear target for absolute reductions. The company was also praised for its public support for a clean energy policy, after advocating the Japanese Government to increase the use of renewable energy.

Sharp scored the fewest points in the guide in the Sustainable Operations category, scoring no points for chemical management due to not communicating commitments made on phasing out hazardous substances in its supply chain. The guide also notes that Sharp had lacked any initiative to address the issue of conflict minerals and the exclusion of paper sourced from suppliers involved in illegal logging or deforestation.

== Sponsorships ==
Sharp was the principal sponsor of Manchester United Football Club from 1983 until 2000, in one of the lengthiest and most lucrative sponsorship deals in English football. Sharp's logo was on the front of United's shirts over these 17 years, during which the team won seven Premier League titles, five FA Cups, one Football League Cup, one UEFA Cup Winners' Cup, and one UEFA Champions League title. During 2002/03 and 2003/04 seasons, Sharp was sponsor on Red Star Belgrade shirts during their campaign in UEFA Cup and UEFA Champions League.

From 1987 to 1994, Sharp was the main shirt sponsor of Hamburger SV in the Bundesliga.

From 2001 to 2003, Sharp was the main shirt sponsor of Inverness Caledonian Thistle F.C. in the SFL.

In June 2012, Sharp became name sponsor of a UCI World Tour cycling team, which thereupon became known as Garmin–Sharp.

In September 2016, Sharp (in conjunction with Altodigital) signed a partnership with Stoke City F.C. for 2 years as an Official Platinum Partner.

In July 2024, Sharp sponsored Formula Ethara team 'Jack-O-Racers' for the competition.

== Product gallery ==
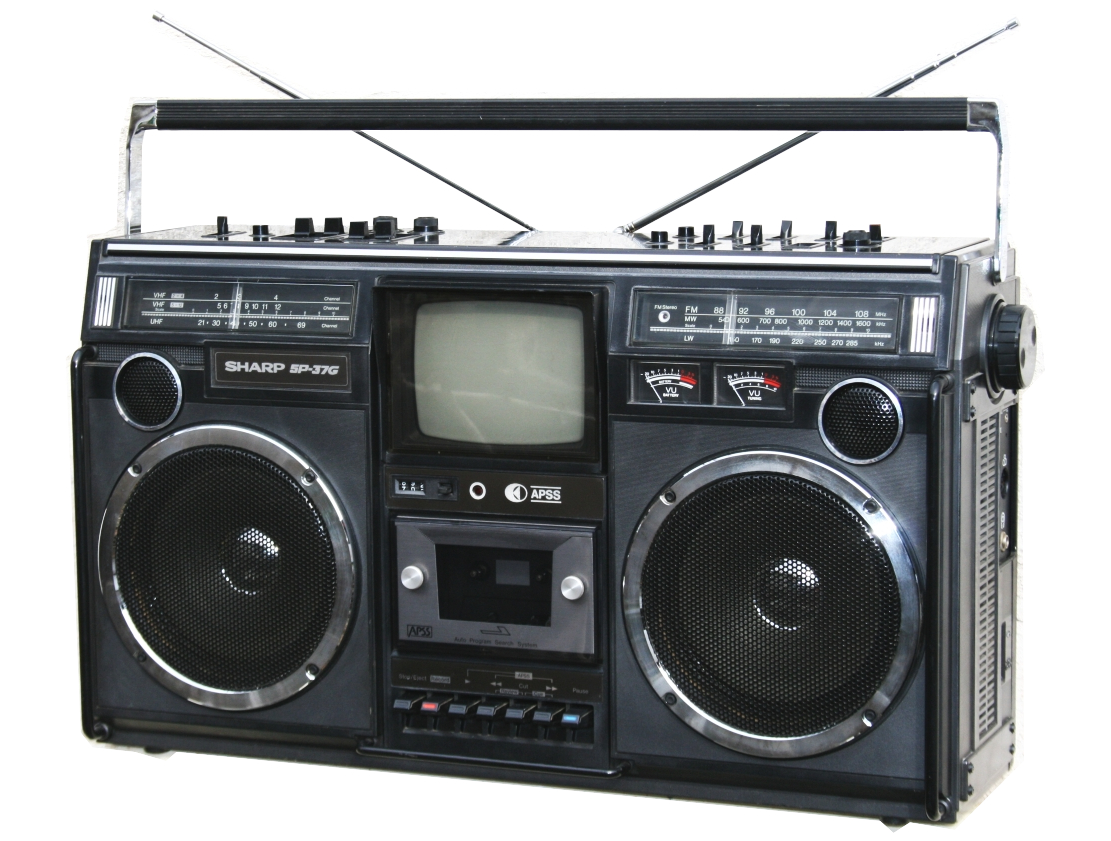
Sharp 5P-37G boombox

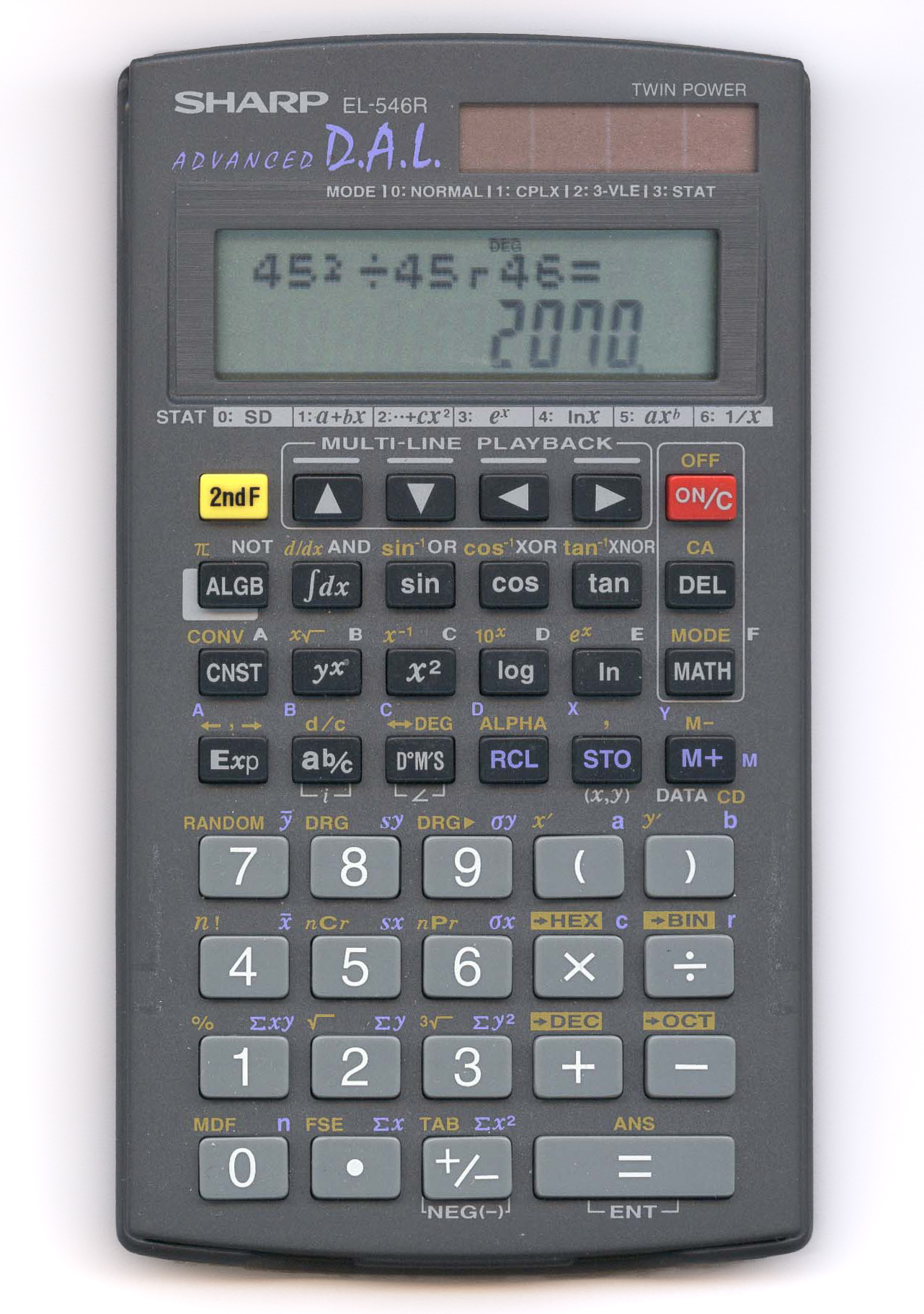
Sharp EL-546R scientific calculator

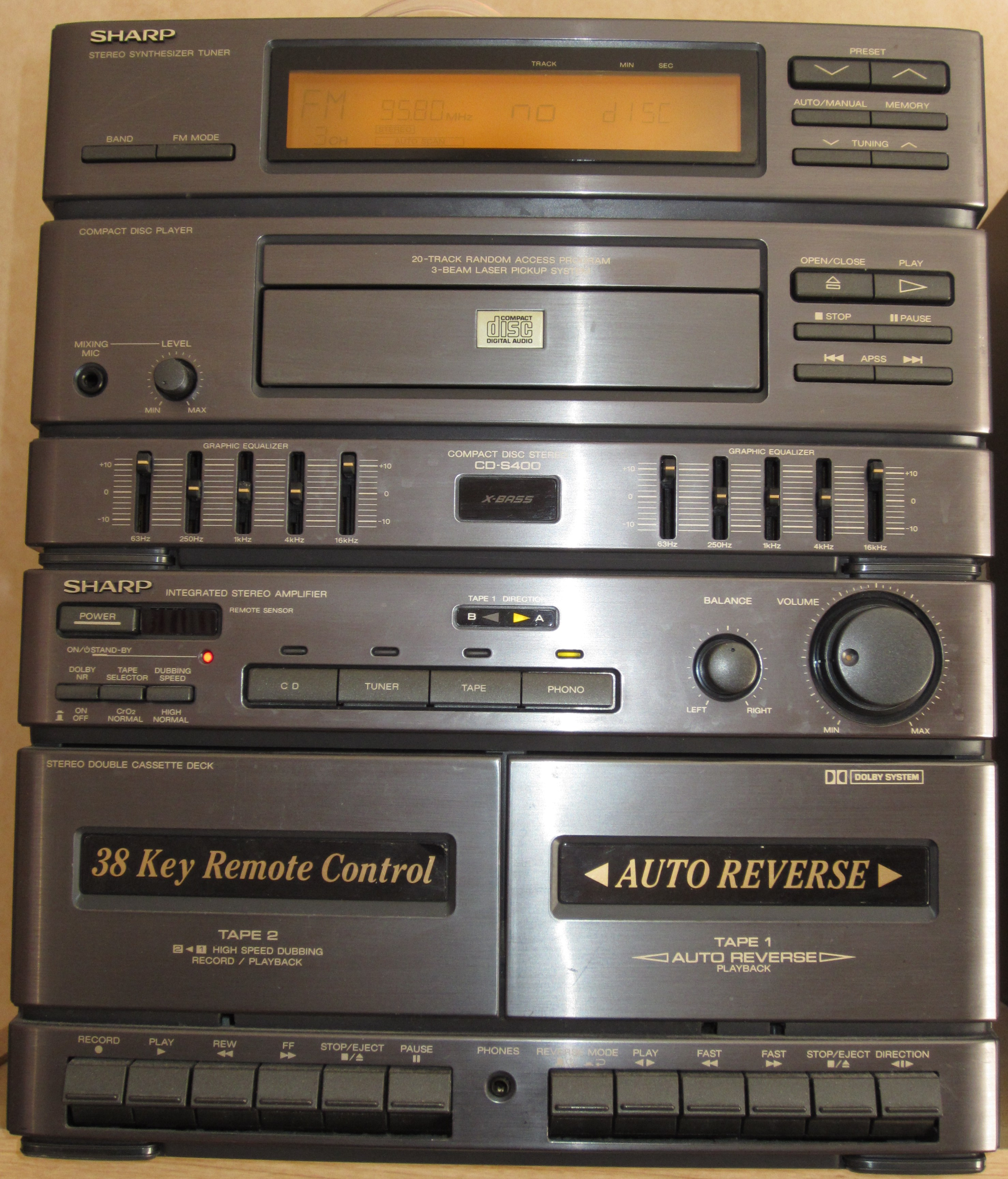
Sharp CD-S400 Hi-Fi stereo system

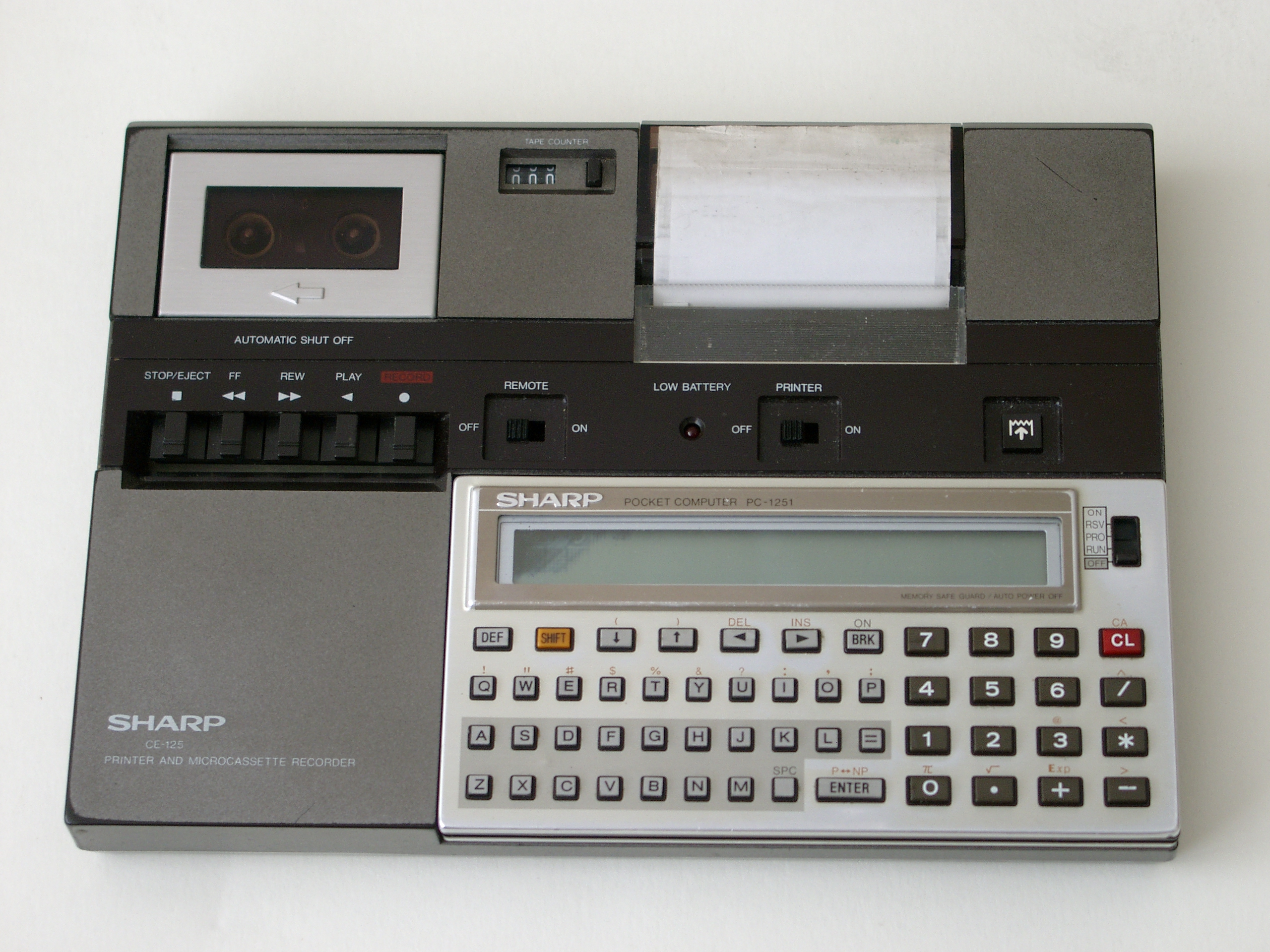
Sharp PC-1251 pocket computer

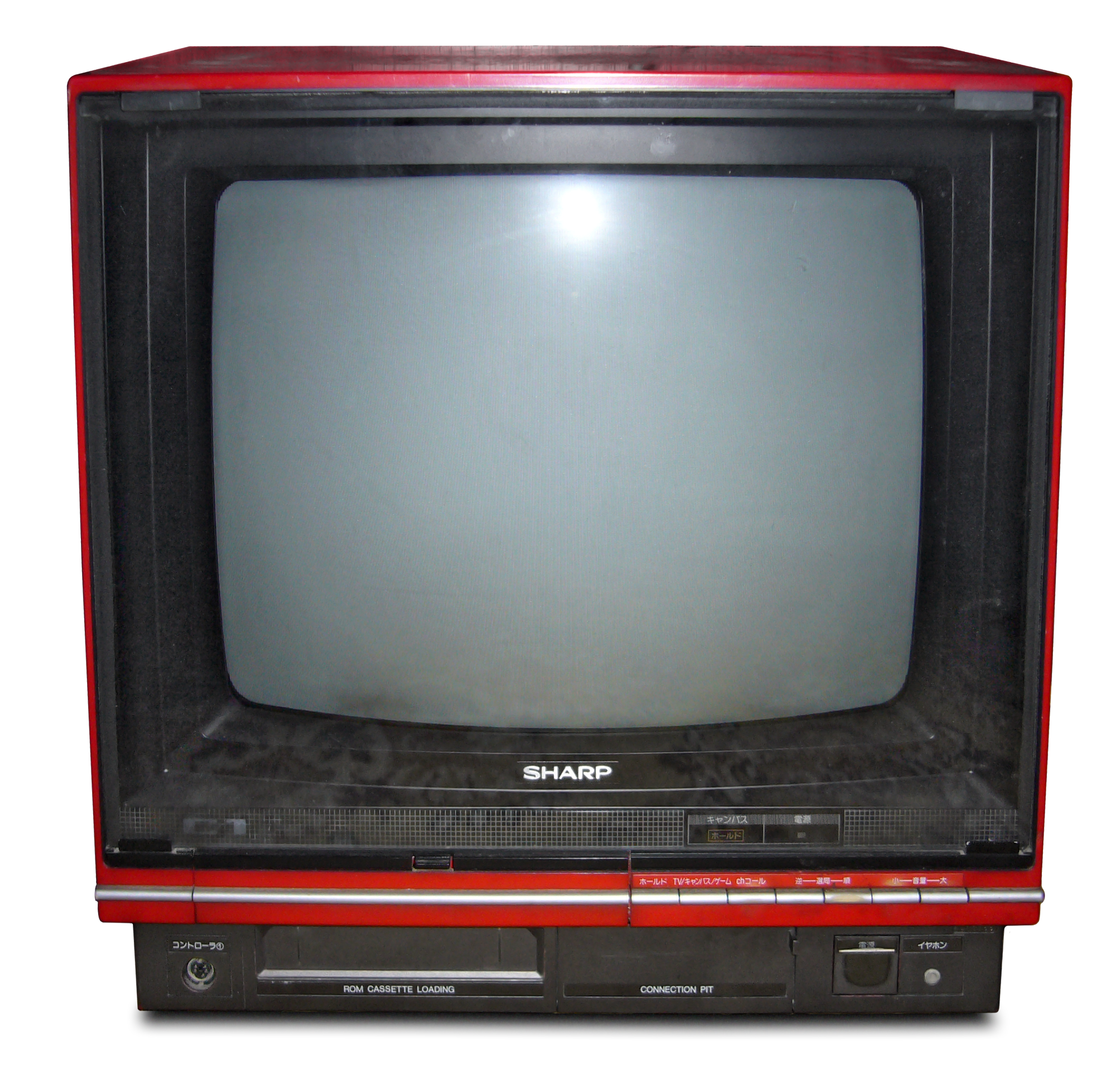
Sharp 14C-C1R television

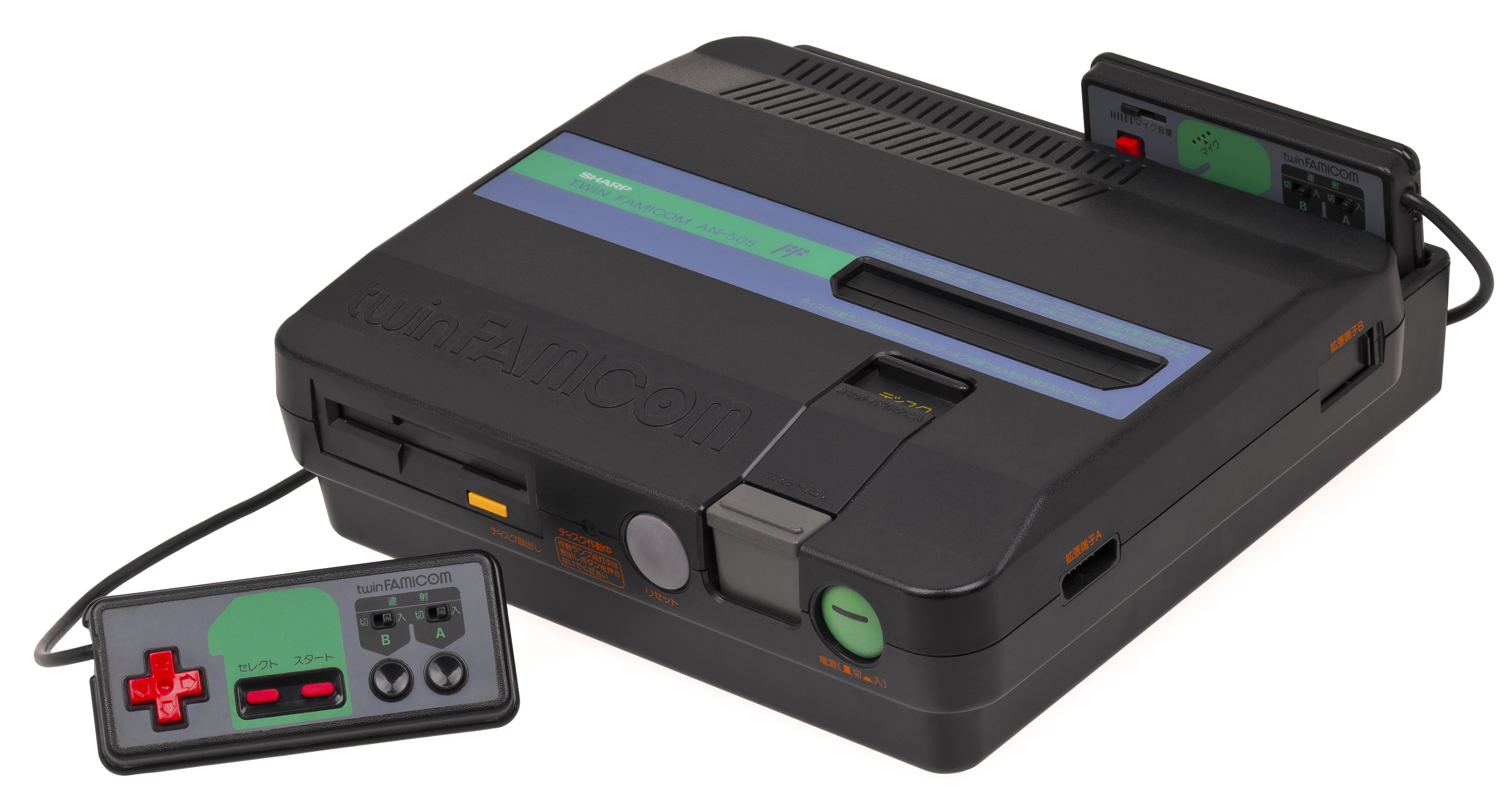
Sharp Twin Famicom licensed game console for Japanese market (1986)

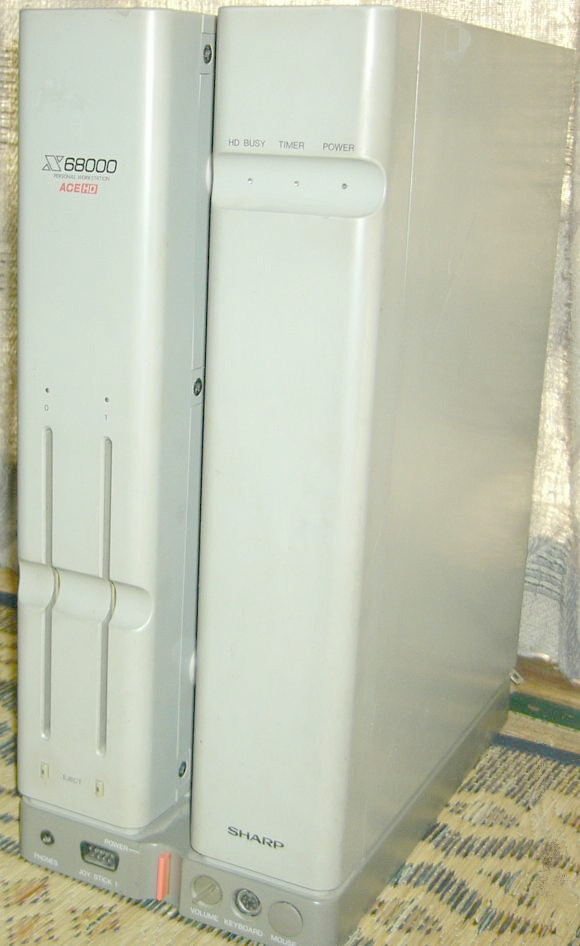
X68000 ACE-HD desktop computer for Japanese market (1988)

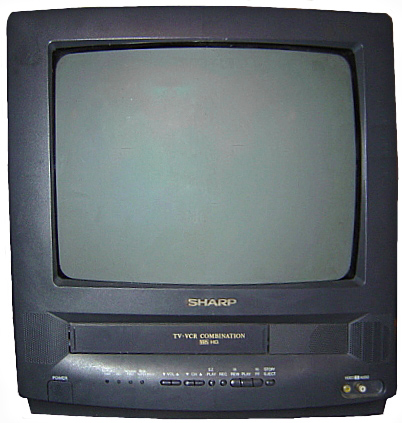
Sharp TV/VCR combo

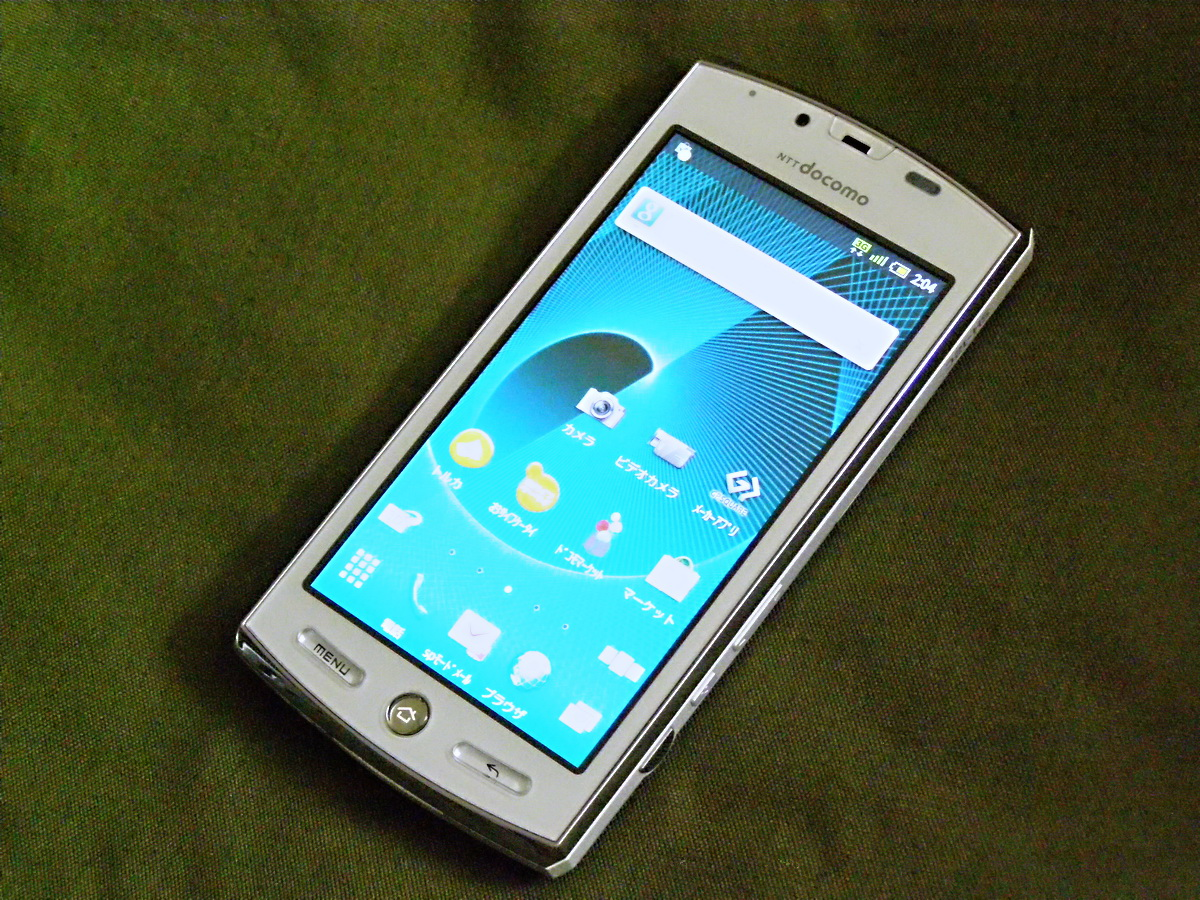
Sharp AQUOS SH-12C mobile phone for Japanese market (2011)

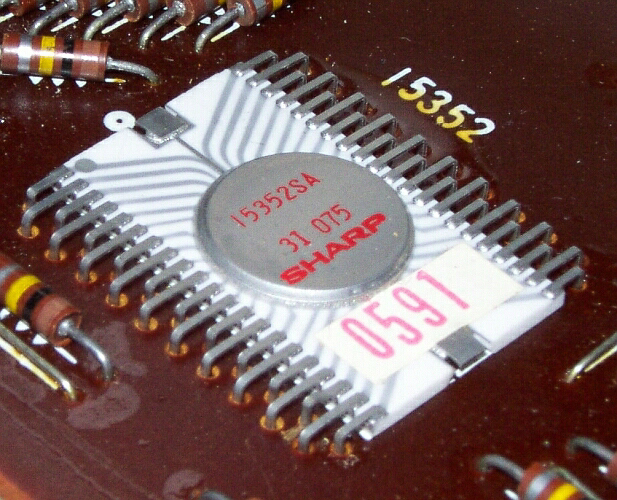
Sharp IC I5352SA in QIP

== Slogans ==
- "New Life Now" (Japan only, 1970s–1985)
- "New Life People" (Japan only, 1985–1988)
- "From Sharp Minds Come Sharp Products" (1980s)
- "Serikan Hidup Anda" (Malaysia only, 1980s–1990s)
- "Pertama & Satu-Satunya di Indonesia" (English: The First and Only in Indonesia, Indonesia only, 1997–2002)
- "Pertama & Satu-Satunya di Dunia" (English: The First and Only in the World, Indonesia only, 1997–2002)
- "Be Sharp" (2002–2016)
- "Be Original" (2016–present)
