= Super Famicom Naizou TV SF1 =

Television set by Sharp

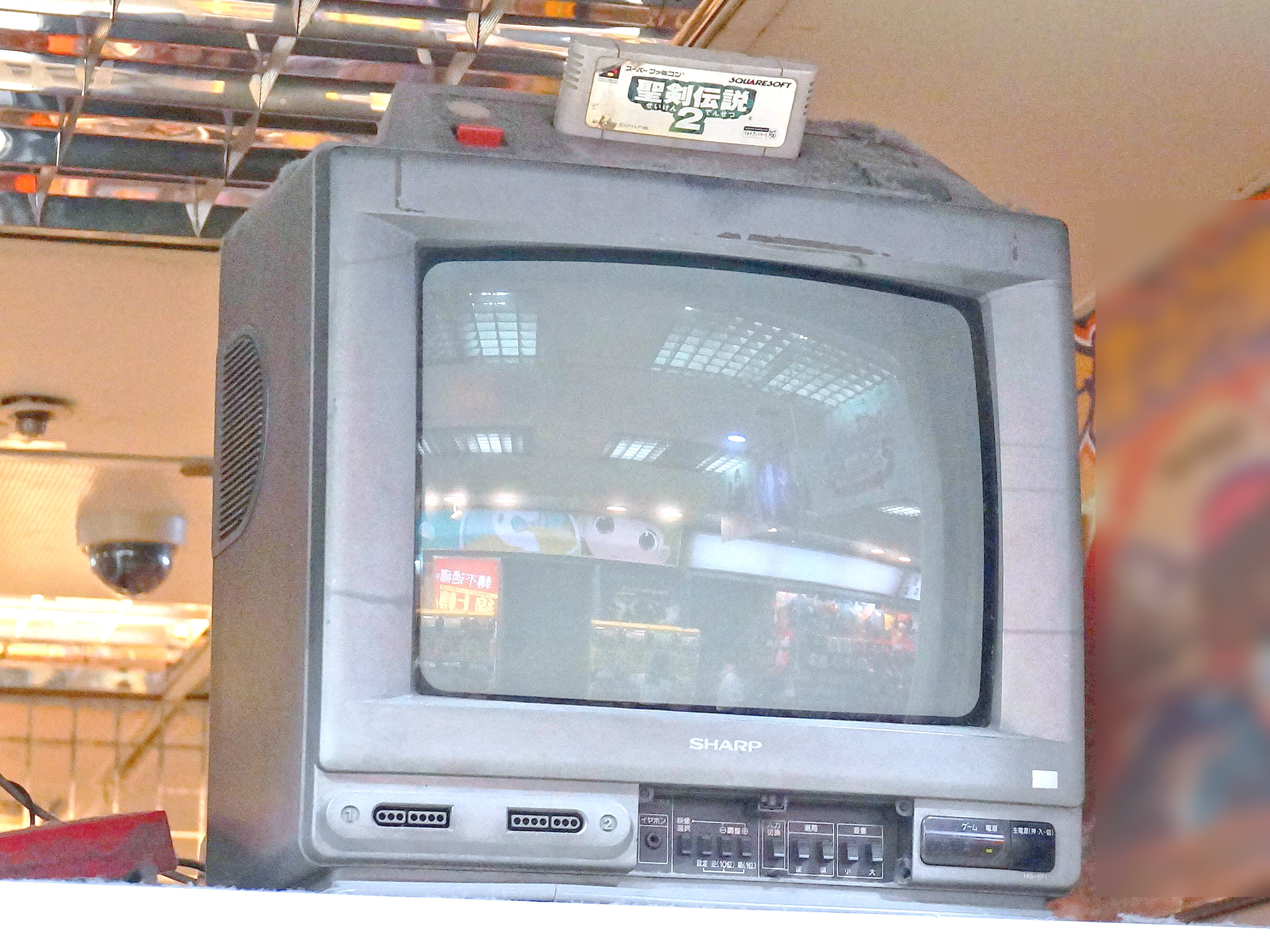
- The 14" 14G-SF1 model of the SF1
- Manufacturer: Sharp
- Type: Video game console, Television set
- Released: JP: December 5, 1990
- Media: ROM cartridge Nintendo Power; Sufami Turbo
- CPU: 16-bit 65c816 Ricoh 5A22 2.68/3.58 MHz
- Storage: Battery backup Flash memory (Satellaview only)
- Controller input: 2 controller ports
- Online services: Satellaview (Japan only)
- Predecessor: C1

The Super Famicom Naizou TV SF1 (スーパーファミコン内蔵テレビSF1, Sūpā Famikon Naizou Terebi SF1) (often described as the SF1 SNES TV) is a television set produced by Sharp Corporation with a built-in licensed Super Famicom. Released only to Japanese markets, the unit retailed in 1990 as a next generation successor to the 1983 C1 television also produced by Sharp and licensed by Nintendo. Like the C1, the SF1 was noted as having superior picture quality to a SFC plugged into a standard television.

== Overview ==
The SF1 came in two different models varying in screen sizes. The larger SF1 unit featured a 21-inch screen and the smaller featured a 14-inch screen. Both units were colored gray, and both included a ROM-cartridge plugin-slot just above the screen. By merging the SFC and the television into one unit, the SF1 avoided the problem of exposed power cords and other cables. This gave the unit the advantage of being easier to handle. With internally connected SFC-SF1 terminals, luminance and chrominance signals could be separated, and the resulting image quality was notably sharper than standard setups. This advantage diminished to a degree in the 14-inch model where picture quality was reduced.

Additional functions were added to the remote control such that the SFC portion of the unit can be reset by simultaneously pressing two buttons. Additionally, the remote control could be used to record gameplay on the VCR.

Unlike the earlier Sharp Nintendo Television, AV output terminals were made readily accessible on the SF1's extended terminal which allowed connection to later peripherals such as the Satellaview. The C1 had been notably unable to connect to the Family Computer Disk System, and the SF1's design was intended to alleviate this problem with any Super Famicom peripherals. To use the extended terminal, the Satellaview's AV output terminal would attach obliquely upward on the back of the "console" portion of the set, and a cover could be applied to prevent dust. Doubts over the awkward attachment of expansion peripherals were among the reasons the unit never ultimately saw an international release.

Despite the graphical superiority and general future-proofing, the SF1 only supports mono audio.

== Models ==
Only two models were released in Japan.

- 14G-SF1 (14 inch, retail price ¥100,000)
- 21G-SF1 (21 inch, retail price ¥133,000)

== See also ==
- Super Nintendo Entertainment System
- Nintendo Entertainment System models#Sharp-produced variants
