= Hogan's Alley =

Hogan's Alley may refer to

== Popular culture ==
- Hogan's Alley (comic strip), an 1890s comic strip that featured the character The Yellow Kid
- Hogan's Alley (video game), a 1984 video game from Nintendo
- Hogan's Alley (magazine), a magazine about the cartoon arts
- Hoagie's Alley is the place where Top Cat lives, a pun on Hogan's Alley
- Hogan's Alley (film), a lost 1925 Warner Brothers film starring Monte Blue
- Hogan's Alley is where the Dugan family lives in the early continuity of the Depression era comic strip Show Girl (later named after its lead character Dixie Dugan).

== Places ==
- Hogan's Alley (FBI), an FBI training facility located in Quantico, Virginia
- Hogan's Alley (Vancouver), a nickname for an alley between Prior and Union streets in Vancouver that had been the city's small African-Canadian neighbourhood and jazz district until demolished for an off-ramp for the Georgia Viaduct
- "Hogan's Alley", a nickname for the Riviera Country Club because of Ben Hogan's success there
- "Hogan's Alley", a nickname for the Colonial Country Club because of Ben Hogan's success there in the annual PGA Tour event, which he won a record five times
- "Hogan's Alley", name for a berthing space located in the After Battery Compartment of a World War II diesel electric submarine.
- "Hogan's Alley", name for an alley in the Bowery, NYC where a murder takes place in the film Docks of New York (1945) starring Leo Gorcey, Huntz Hall and the Eastside Kids.
