= Nintendo VS. System =

Arcade cabinet series

VS. System
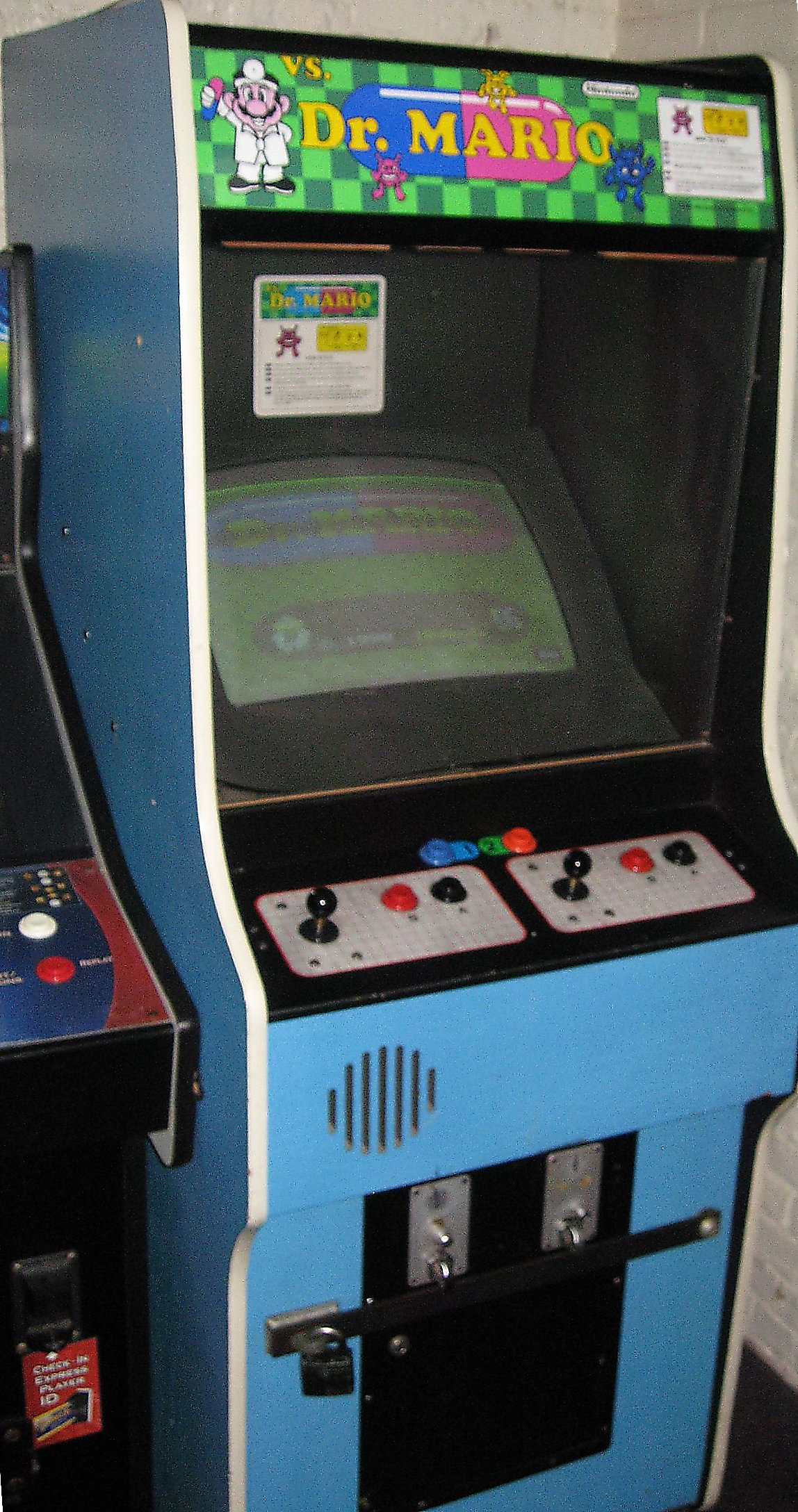
- A VS. Dr. Mario arcade machine
- Developer: Nintendo
- Manufacturer: Nintendo
- Type: Arcade video game
- Released: January 1984; 42 years ago
- Lifespan: 1984-1992
- Discontinued: JP: Late 1985 (Nintendo); WW: July 31, 1992
- Units sold: 100,000
- Media: ROM chips
- CPU: Ricoh 2A03
- Platform: NES-based
- Best-selling game: VS. Super Mario Bros.
- Successor: PlayChoice-10

The Nintendo VS. System (Note: Japanese: 任天堂VS.システム, Hepburn: Nintendō Buiesu Shisutemu) is an arcade system that was developed and produced by Nintendo. It is based on most of the same hardware as the Family Computer (Famicom), later released as the Nintendo Entertainment System (NES). As Nintendo was planning to release the NES in North America, they became wary of the effects the video game crash of 1983 on the home console market. By March 1984, the U.S. arcade industry recovered enough for a plan to introduce NES titles, by having the VS. System serve as a preview of the console to prospective players. It became the first version of the Famicom hardware to debut in North America.

Most of its games are conversions from the Famicom and NES, some heavily altered for the arcade format, and some debuted on the VS. System before being released on the Famicom or NES. The system focuses on two-player cooperative play. It was released in three different configurations: upright VS. UniSystem cabinets, upright VS. DualSystem cabinets, and sit-down VS. DualSystem cabinets. Games are on pluggable circuit boards, allowing for each side to have a different game.

The VS. System did not have lasting popularity in Japan, leading to Nintendo's departure from arcade game development. In contrast, it was a commercial success in the United States, with about 100,000 arcade cabinets sold, becoming the highest-grossing arcade machine of 1985. The system's success in arcades proved the market for the test release of the NES in North America in 1985. The final VS. System game was released in 1990.

== Background ==
In 1980, Data East had introduced the concept of a convertible arcade system board, or arcade conversion system, with the DECO Cassette System, but it was not a major success. The first successful arcade conversion system is Sega's Convert-a-Game system in 1981. Its success led to several other arcade manufacturers introducing their own arcade conversion systems by the mid-1980s, including the Nintendo VS. System in 1984.

The Nintendo VS. System is pivotal in the history of the Nintendo Entertainment System (NES). The VS. System is the first version of the Family Computer (Famicom) hardware to debut in North America during 1984, the success of which proved the market for the official release of the NES console. Following the North American home video game crash of 1983, Nintendo's negotiations with Atari to introduce the Famicom in North America stalled due to Atari's ongoing debacle, and Nintendo of America's market research garnered warnings from retailers and distributors to stay away from home consoles, with U.S. retailers refusing to stock game consoles. Meanwhile, the arcade game industry also had a slump as the golden age of arcade video games was coming to an end, but the arcade industry recovered and stabilized with the help of software conversion kit systems, such as Sega's Convert-a-Game system, the Atari System 1, and the Nintendo-Pak system. Nintendo president Hiroshi Yamauchi realized there was still a market for video games in North America, where players were gradually returning to arcades in significant numbers. Yamauchi still had faith there was a market for the Famicom, so he introduced it to North America through the arcade industry.

Nintendo based the VS. System hardware on the Famicom, and introduced it as the successor to its Nintendo-Pak arcade system, which had been used for games such as Mario Bros. and Donkey Kong 3. Though technologically inferior to Nintendo's Punch-Out!! arcade hardware, the VS. System was relatively inexpensive. The Nintendo-Pak and Punch-Out!! hardware also have a limited game library, whereas the VS. System accessed a wider variety of games, by easily converting Famicom games. Nintendo of America hired Jeff Walker from Bally to help market the VS. System in North America, where it debuted at the 1984 ASI show along with Punch-Out!! in February.

Nintendo of America announced in July 1992 that it would stop making arcade machines. The announcement included the last upcoming titles for the NES-based PlayChoice-10 and the SNES-based Nintendo Super System, but none for the VS. System.

== Hardware ==
The VS. System was designed primarily as a kit to retrofit Donkey Kong, Donkey Kong Jr., Donkey Kong 3, Popeye, and Mario Bros. cabinets, so they require the same special monitor. These monitors use inverse voltage levels for their video signals as compared to most arcade monitors.

Almost all VS. System cabinets have identical hardware powered by a Ricoh 2A03 central processing unit (CPU), the same in the NES, except for special PPUs or video chips. Each chip contains a different palette that arrange the colors in different configurations chosen apparently at random. Most boards can be switched to a new game simply by swapping the program ROMs and the appropriate PPU or the game will have incorrect colors. Several of the later units employ further copy protection by using special PPUs which swap pairs of I/O registers or return special data from normally unimplemented regions of memory, and games are not interchangeable with these models.

Some dedicated double cabinets look like two games butted together at an angle, with a single motherboard. The Red Tent, a steel sit-down cabinet for the VS. DualSystem, allows play for up to four players simultaneously. It has the same motherboard as the double cabinet.

Because the VS. System has the same CPU as the NES, its games can be ported to the NES with modifications to the console including extra memory banks and additional DIP switches. Some games differ from their home console versions. For example, VS. Super Mario Bros. is considerably more difficult than Super Mario Bros.; some of the levels were reused in Super Mario Bros.: The Lost Levels for the Famicom Disk System. Some games' graphics differ, such as VS. Duck Hunt having more details and animation sequences.

== List of games ==
Unknown prototypes of VS. System games may have been either unreleased or released briefly for market testing. The launch game is VS. Tennis, released in January 1984.

Title	Distributor	Released (JP)	Released (NA)	Ref
VS. Tennis	Nintendo	January 1984	March 1984	
VS. Mah-Jong	Nintendo	February 1984	Unreleased	
VS. Baseball	Nintendo	May 1, 1984	July 1984	
VS. Wrecking Crew	Nintendo	July 26, 1984	September 1984	
VS. Pinball	Nintendo	July 26, 1984	October 1984	
VS. Stroke and Match Golf	Nintendo	July 26, 1984	October 1984	
VS. Ladies Golf	Nintendo	July 26, 1984	December 1984	
VS. Balloon Fight	Nintendo	October 3, 1984	September 1984	
VS. Clu Clu Land	Nintendo	December 7, 1984	Unreleased	
VS. Excitebike	Nintendo	December 7, 1984	February 1985	
VS. Urban Champion	Nintendo	December 1984	January 1985	
VS. Ice Climber	Nintendo	February 1, 1985	March 1985	
VS. Raid on Bungeling Bay	Nintendo	April 1985	Unreleased	
VS. Hogan's Alley	Nintendo	Unreleased	May 1985	
VS. Duck Hunt	Nintendo	Unreleased	May 1985	
VS. Mach Rider	Nintendo	August 1985	November 1985	
VS. Soccer	Nintendo	December 10, 1985	November 1985	
VS. Battle City	Namco	1985	Unreleased	
VS. Star Luster	Namco	1985	Unreleased	
VS. Super Mario Bros.	Nintendo	Unreleased	February 1986	
VS. Ninja JaJaMaru-kun	Jaleco	April 1986	Unreleased	
VS. Gumshoe	Nintendo	Unreleased	May 1986	
VS. Slalom	Nintendo	Unreleased	October 1986	
VS. Gradius	Nintendo	Unreleased	November 1986	
VS. The Goonies	Nintendo	Unreleased	November 1986	
VS. Super Sky Kid	Namco	Unreleased	November 1986	
VS. Family Stadium / R.B.I. Baseball	Namco (JP); Atari Games (US)	December 10, 1986	1987	
VS. Super Xevious: GAMP no Nazo	Namco	1986	Unreleased	
VS. Tower of Babel	Namco	1986	Unreleased	
VS. Valkyrie no Bōken: Toki no Kagi Densetsu	Namco	1986	Unreleased	
VS. Castlevania	Nintendo	Unreleased	April 1987	
VS. Family Tennis	Namco	December 1987	Unreleased	
VS. T.K.O. Boxing	Data East	Unreleased	1987	
VS. The Quest of Ki	Namco	1988	Unreleased	
VS. Top Gun	Konami	Unreleased	March 1988	
VS. Freedom Force	Nintendo	Unreleased	March 1988	
VS. Platoon	Sunsoft	Unreleased	November 1988	
VS. Dr. Mario	Nintendo	Unreleased	August 1990	
VS. Motocross	Nintendo	Unreleased	Cancelled	
VS. Nintendo 500	Nintendo	Unreleased	Cancelled	
VS. Football	Nintendo	Unreleased	Cancelled	
VS. Helifighter	Nintendo	Unreleased	Cancelled	
VS. Head to Head Baseball	Nintendo	Unreleased	Cancelled	
VS. Mighty Bomb Jack	Tecmo	Cancelled	Cancelled	
VS. Great Tennis	Jaleco	Cancelled	Unreleased	
VS. Lionex (prototype)	Sunsoft	Cancelled	Unreleased	
VS. The Wing of Madoola (prototype)	Sunsoft	Cancelled	Unreleased	
VS. Tetris	Atari Games	Unreleased	Cancelled	

== Reception ==
Upon release, the VS. System generated excitement in the arcade industry, receiving praise for its easy conversions, affordability, flexibility, and multiplayer capabilities. Eddie Adlum of RePlay magazine said Nintendo had suddenly become "the big guy on the block" in 1984 due to the VS. System, which "not only meant interchangeable games but interaction between players on dual-monitor games". For Play Meter magazine, Roger C. Sharpe called it a "highly attractive and open-ended interchangeable game system featuring excellent graphics and realistic on-screen visuals" in 1984 and Gene Lewin gave the system a rating of 10+ out of 10 in 1985. Others criticized the system's graphics as technologically weaker than more recent rival arcade systems, and than Nintendo's own powerful Punch-Out!! arcade hardware.

In Japan, VS. Tennis topped Japan's chart for table arcade cabinets in April 1984 and May 1984, and VS. Baseball topped the chart in June and July 1984. By 1985, however, the VS. System had declined in Japan, which led to Yamauchi deciding to withdraw Nintendo from the Japanese coin-op industry in late 1985 and Nintendo focusing more on the Famicom.

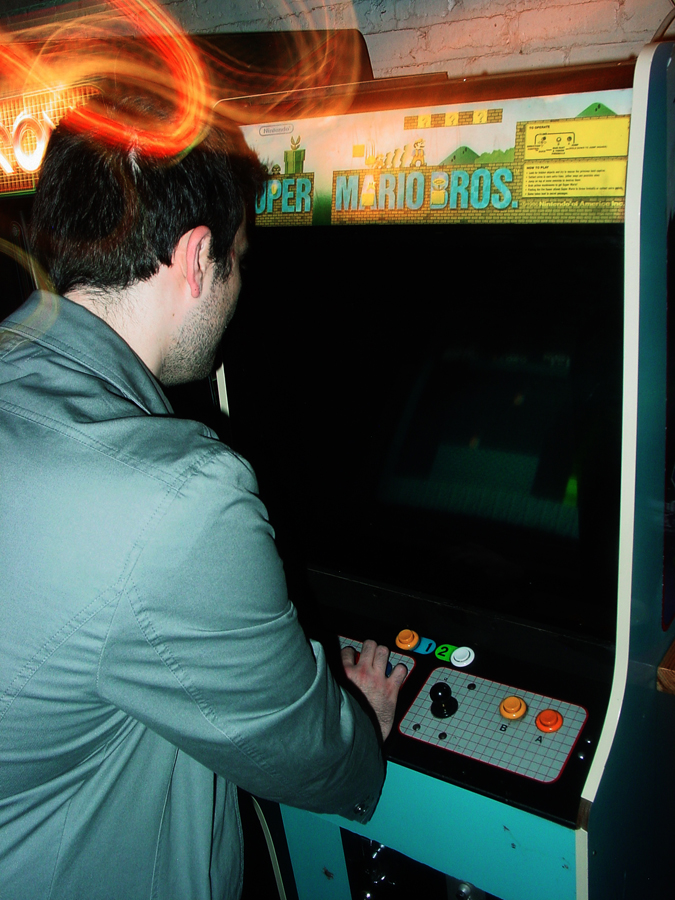
VS. Super Mario Bros. is the highest-selling unit in the series.

In North America, by contrast, the VS. System became a major success. Following the arcade success of sports video games such as Konami's Track & Field (1983), Nintendo capitalized on this trend with sports games Punch-Out!!, VS. Tennis, and VS. Baseball with great success in the US arcade market; Sharpe considered Nintendo "a force to reckon with" based on this strong performance. The VS. System was declared an "overwhelming hit" by Play Meter, attributing its success to "good games and low price". Between 10,000 and 20,000 arcade cabinets were sold in 1984, and individual VS. games were top earners on arcade charts. VS. Tennis topped the arcade charts for software conversion kits in July 1984 (on the RePlay charts) and August 1984 (on the Play Meter charts), and VS. Baseball topped the charts from September through November 1984. Hogan's Alley and Duck Hunt then became even more popular in American arcades, popularizing light gun shooter video games. By 1985, 50,000 cabinets had been sold, establishing Nintendo as an industry leader in the arcades. In November 1985, five VS. games were on the US RePlay top 20 arcade charts, with Hogan's Alley holding the top spot. Duck Hunt was also popular in arcades at the time. The VS. System went on to become the highest-grossing arcade platform of 1985 in the United States, and Hogan's Alley and Excitebike became the top two highest-grossing arcade system games that year.

The success of the VS. System gave Nintendo the confidence to repackage the Famicom for North America as the NES. Nintendo's strong positive reputation in the arcades also generated significant interest in the NES. It also gave Nintendo the opportunity to test new games as VS. Paks in the arcades, to determine which games to release for the NES launch. Nintendo's software strategy was to first release games for the Famicom, then the VS. System, and then for the NES. This allowed Nintendo to build a solid launch line-up for the NES. Many games' North American debut was on the VS. System before being released for the NES, which gave players the impression of being "amazed" at the accuracy of the arcade "ports" for the NES. At the time, most arcade game hardware was significantly more powerful than home console hardware, and game developers would go through significant effort to try to replicate arcade games on the less powerful home consoles, often with little success.

Within a few months of its 1986 release, 20,000 VS. Super Mario Bros. arcade units were sold, becoming the best-selling VS. release, with each unit consistently earning more than $200 (equivalent to $590 in 2025) per week. Its arcade success helped introduce Super Mario Bros. to many players who did not yet own an NES. By the time the NES was launched in North America (from late 1985 to 1986), about 100,000 VS. Systems had been sold to American arcades. According to Ken Horowitz, the VS. System "was perhaps the most vital catalyst in the rise of the NES to the top of the home video game market".

In Europe, the VS. System was also a success in arcades by early 1986, before the launch of the NES there. At London's Amusement Trades Exhibition International (ATEI) show in January 1986, David Snook of Play Meter magazine listed VS. Super Mario Bros. as one of the top five hits of the show, along with Space Harrier, Halley's Comet, Gauntlet and Tehkan World Cup. In 1990, VS. Dr. Mario sold several thousand arcade units in North America.

== See also ==
- PlayChoice-10, Nintendo's other NES-based arcade series
- Nintendo Super System, the Super NES-based arcade system
- Wild Gunman (1984), which had a fictional VS. arcade version featured in the film Back to the Future Part II (1989)
- R.O.B., a toy robot designed to help the NES's commercial performance
