= Freedom Force =

Freedom Force may refer to:

- Freedom Force (comics), two teams in the Marvel Comics universe
- Freedom Force (1988 video game), a video game for the Nintendo Entertainment System
- Freedom Force (2002 video game), a superhero game by Irrational Games
- The Freedom Force (TV series), a 1978 animated TV series
- Freedom Force, a militant group involved in insurgency in Jammu and Kashmir
- Freedom Force International, a group founded by G. Edward Griffin
- Freedom Force (2012 film), a Peruvian animated movie directed by Eduardo Schuldt
