= Baby Boomer (video game) =

1989 video game

- Developer: Color Dreams
- Publishers: Color Dreams; Gradiente (Brazil)
- Designer: Jim Meuer
- Platform: Nintendo Entertainment System
- Release: NA: 1989; SA: 1989
- Genre: Light gun shooter
- Modes: Single-player, multiplayer

Baby Boomer is a 1989 light gun shooter developed by Color Dreams for the Nintendo Entertainment System (NES). As the first game released by Color Dreams, its cartridge is not approved or licensed by Nintendo. To bypass the console's 10NES lockout chip, the game uses a distinct baby blue cartridge casing with a voltage-spike circuit. The player uses the Zapper to protect a crawling infant from hazards across scrolling levels that range from suburban backyards to the pits of Hell.

Retrospective reception has been heavily negative, citing broken hit detection, unfair difficulty, and polarized comparisons to Nintendo's early Zapper game, Gumshoe (1986). The A.V. Club ranked it as the worst Zapper game ever released. A sequel titled Baby Boomer 2: 35 Years Too Soon was released in 2024 for modern platforms.

== Gameplay ==
Boomer has fallen down a hole, leading to his instant demise.

The game is a scrolling shooter in which the player protects a baby named Boomer, who crawls automatically across the screen from left to right. The player uses the Zapper to shoot enemies and environmental hazards before they deplete Boomer's life or impede his progress. Hazards include birds of prey, bottomless pits, and demonic enemies. Certain environmental objects interact with shots; for example, shooting clouds creates ice bridges over pits to allow safe passage.

The game features a "milk meter" which acts as a hunger timer; if the meter depletes, the baby dies of starvation. Levels progress through distinct themes, starting in a suburban backyard and wilderness before moving to a graveyard, the "Pearly Gates" of Heaven, and the pits of Hell.

Up to two players can participate simultaneously. Player one uses the Zapper to shoot enemies, while player two uses a standard controller to move Boomer and manage movement speed.

== Release ==
In 1989, Baby Boomer became the first game released by Color Dreams, and it remains one of only two unlicensed Zapper games. Because Color Dreams did not secure a license from Nintendo, it could not use the standard gray NES cartridge shells. Instead, it manufactured its own cartridges in a distinct baby blue color, including a charge pump circuit to bypass the 10NES lockout chip, a copy protection system used by Nintendo to block unauthorized software.

In Brazil, Color Dreams licensed the game to Gradiente.

== Reception ==
The game received generally negative reviews, especially for its difficulty, graphics, and hit detection. In 2008, NintendoAge eZine called it "unique" and "loosely akin" to Nintendo's early Gumshoe (1986), summarizing: "Though it's not the worst of the Color Dreams releases, it's still pretty lame, replayability 2/10, and that's generous." In 2016, The A.V. Club ranked Baby Boomer last in a list of 18 Zapper games, describing it as "broken" and "unplayable" due to the game providing no visual feedback on what the player is shooting. It said, "Like Gumshoe, Baby Boomer is really hard; unlike Gumshoe, Baby Boomer has grating music and ugly graphics and looks like a cheap rush job."

== Sequel ==
Baby Boomer 2: 35 Years Too Soon was released on August 16, 2024, for PlayStation 4, PlayStation 5, and Windows via the Epic Games Store. It was developed by the indie studio Kimulator's Films under license from Piko Interactive and Color Dreams (operating as Wisdom Tree). It supports local cooperative multiplayer for up to four players.
