= Wild Gunman =

1984 video game

- North American NES box art
- Developers: Nintendo R&D1; Intelligent Systems
- Publishers: Nintendo; Sega (Arcade)
- Director: Shigeru Miyamoto
- Producers: Hiroshi Imanishi; Shigeru Miyamoto; Gunpei Yokoi
- Designers: Shigeru Miyamoto; Makoto Kanoh
- Composer: Hirokazu Tanaka
- Platforms: NES; Arcade
- Release: JP: February 18, 1984; NA: October 18, 1985; EU: February 15, 1988
- Genre: Light gun shooter
- Mode: Single-player
- Arcade system: PlayChoice-10

Wild Gunman (Note: Japanese: ワイルドガンマン, Hepburn: Wairudo Ganman) is a light gun shooter game developed and published by Nintendo. Based on a 1974 electro-mechanical arcade game by Gunpei Yokoi, it was adapted to a video game for the Famicom console in Japan in 1984. In North America, it was released in 1985 as a launch game for the Nintendo Entertainment System (NES) with the Zapper light gun.

The game from 1974 was formerly known as Gun Fight.

== Background ==
=== 1974 arcade game ===
Wild Gunman is one of Nintendo's electro-mechanical (EM) arcade games created by Gunpei Yokoi and released in 1974. It consists of a light gun connected to a 16 mm projection screen. Full-motion video footage of an American Wild West gunslinger is projected onto the screen. When this enemy character's eyes flash, the player draws and fires the gun. If the player is fast enough, the projection changes to that of the shot gunman falling down; otherwise it shows the gunman drawing and firing his gun.

Regardless of their success, the player continues to face off against other gunslinger opponents, of which there are five in total.

Should the player draw their gun prematurely, a "foul" light turns on and the player's input is ignored until the next duel begins, rendering the current duel unwinnable.

Wild Gunman was released in North America by Sega in 1976. The game's footage was filmed with local, uncredited extras on location around Kyoto and at the Nara Dreamland amusement park.

A recreation of the arcade game was made by Canadian arcade repairman and Youtuber Callan Brown, who plans to showcase it to the public at the 2026 Ontario PinFest convention from May 30 to May 31 with other Wild Gunman-based merchandise from Nintendo.

=== NES video game ===
Nintendo adapted the electro-mechanical game into a video game, replacing filmed footage with cartoon-style sprites.

In 1984 in Japan, the Famicom version was released for use with the original version of the Zapper gun peripheral, known as the Beam Gun (光線銃, Kōsen jū). This was a plastic, western-style revolver accessory (modeled after the Colt Single Action Army) that came packaged with a plastic holster belt. In 1985 in the United States, it was released on the Nintendo Entertainment System.

Nintendo re-released the game to the Wii U Virtual Console on October 21, 2015, to coincide with Back to the Future Day, honoring the game's appearance in the film.

One example of the Beam Gun was reportedly on display at the National Museum of Nature and Science in Japan.

== Gameplay ==
Screenshot showing typical gameplay of Wild Gunman for the NES

The player waits for the opponent's eyes to flash (accompanied by a speech bubble reading "FIRE!!") before shooting. Firing the gun prematurely makes the duel unwinnable, and the next duel is shown.

=== Arcade specifics ===
The game consists of four film scenes, called Film-A, Film-B, Film-C and Film-D. Each scene was shot on two 16 mm film reels, for displaying alternate outcomes, making up a total of eight film reels. Two of the original reels were discovered by collector Benjamin Solovey in 2021.

=== NES specifics ===
It consists of three game modes, which are GAME A, GAME B and GAME C. GAME A has the player face off against one outlaw; GAME B has the player face off against two outlaws; GAME C has the player face off against an entire outlaw gang.

== Development ==
The game's design was taken from Nintendo's Laser Clay Shooting System.

The NES version was published on the PlayChoice-10 arcade system. On the Wii U Virtual Console, the Wii Remote pointer is used instead of the Zapper.

== Reception ==
In Japan, Wild Gunman was the sixth highest-grossing EM arcade game of 1976, below two other Nintendo Laser Clay Shooting System titles, Sky Hawk at fourth place and Mini Laser Clay at fifth. In North America, Wild Gunman was one of the most popular arcade machines at the AMOA 1976 show.

The 1974 game sold around 100 units, making them very rare to acquire.

== Legacy ==
=== Films ===
Experimental filmmaker Craig Baldwin's 1978 short Wild Gunman features footage from the original 1974 arcade game which was re-edited, sped up, and slowed down to surreal effect.

The 1974 arcade game also appears in the 1981 film Gas, being played by the main antagonist. The film establishes the antagonist's ruthless cowboy-like personality by juxtaposing directly captured clips of the game with footage of him giving an expository monologue to his sons (and the audience) while playing. After delivering the monologue, he loses to a gunman and proceeds to shoot the game's projector screen multiple times with a real gun. The game's appearance is also a nod to the character's actor, frequent western star Sterling Hayden.

In the 1989 film Back to the Future Part II, protagonist Marty McFly plays a non-existent arcade version of the NES Wild Gunman resembling a Nintendo VS. System cabinet. The 1990 follow-up, Part III, reveals that frequently playing the game has given Marty the skill to shoot a real revolver.

=== Video Games ===
In the Super Smash Bros. series, the Duck Hunt duo can summon Wild Gunman characters to attack their opponents. Their "Final Smash" attack causes opponents to get caught in the middle of a shootout between the gunmen and the enemy characters from Hogan's Alley.

== See also ==
- Duck Hunt
- Hogan's Alley
- Gumshoe
- Laser Clay Shooting System
