= The Lone Ranger (video game) =

1991 video game

- Developer: Konami
- Publisher: Konami
- Programmers: Satoshi Kishiwada; Takashi Kondo; Hidenao Yamane; Skelton Moppy
- Artists: Yoshiharu Kambe; Yasuji Terada; Bonobono Sato
- Composers: Yoshinori Sasaki; Kenichi Matsubara; Kozo Nakamura; Tomoya Tomita; Kenichiro Fukui; Satoko Miyawaki
- Platform: Nintendo Entertainment System
- Release: NA: August 1991
- Genre: Action-adventure
- Mode: Single-player

The Lone Ranger is a 1991 action-adventure game developed and published by Konami for the Nintendo Entertainment System (NES). Released only in North America, it is based on The Lone Ranger radio and TV franchise, the latter which was still rerunning in syndication when the game was released. The player takes the role of the Lone Ranger himself as he engages against outlaws in side-scrolling, overhead, and even first-person segments. The Lone Ranger theme music is played prominently during the game, which includes a DPCM-coded voice clip of the ranger shouting his catch-phrase "Hi Yo Silver".

== Plot ==
The game follows the basic premise of the Lone Rangers mythos. The player takes control of the Lone Ranger, a former Texas Ranger whose comrades were murdered by an outlaw named Butch Cavendish. While the game's instruction manual deviates from the original radio serials and TV series by claiming that Dan Reid was John Reid's father, the game itself remains true to its source material by identifying one of the murdered rangers as the Lone Ranger's brother. Using an overall storyline that is similar to the film The Legend of the Lone Ranger, the game's ultimate goal involves rescuing the President of the U.S. from Butch Cavendish and his gang.

== Gameplay ==
Gameplay screenshot

There are a total of eight areas in the game, where the player must accomplish a different objective on each one before moving to the next one. Each area begins at a large overhead map with the Lone Ranger's partner Tonto giving him advice on where to go next. On the map, the player can the move the Lone Ranger to various towns, caverns, mountains, bridges, and other locations, as well as run into wandering gangs of outlaws who will attack the Ranger. Sometimes new locations will be revealed by a blinking Sheriff's star on the map after the player has fulfilled certain achievements. The locations in the game vary between top-down, side-scrolling, or even first-person exploring segments.

The Ranger's main weapon is a six-round revolver which can be loaded with standard or silver bullets (which cost twice as much, but have twice the firepower and can cut through targets). TNT sticks and even the Ranger's own fists can be used as weapons as well in the side-scrolling and top-down segments. The player can also obtain money bags and heart icons from defeated enemies to increase their cash and replenish their health respectively. If the player loses all of their energy the game will be over and the player must restart at the beginning of the Area. After completing an Area, Tonto will provide the player with a password which can be used to continue where the player has left off.

All of the game's towns, as well as other stages, are played from a top-down perspective. At the towns, the player will talk to townsfolk on the streets or inside houses, who will provide clues on where to go next. The player can buy more ammunition and TNT at a gun shop or restore their health at the doctor's office by using the cash obtained from enemies. The gunsmith can also upgrade, or even downgrade if desired, the shooting range of the player's revolver by equipping it with a short, medium, or long barrel. The player can also play minigames in certain places to win extra cash. The player will face enemies in the top-down segments as well. If a woman is killed during a gunfight, the player will be penalized with the loss of half of their cash and some of their energy. The controls do not differ much in the side-scrolling segments aside from the fact that the player can jump over platforms or climb down from them, as well as crouch or climb stairs.

Most of the first-person exploration stages have the player exploring a maze-like corridor trying to reach a certain objective (e.g. find the fragment of a treasure). The player will occasionally be attacked by outlaws from all four directions during these stages. During these battles, a radar indicator is located below the screen to indicate where the enemies are attacking from. Unlike the other types of stages, the player can only use their revolver in these segments, although certain enemies will drop additional bullets. These battles can also be played using the NES Zapper light gun or the LaserScope headphone controller in addition to the standard controller.
