= Barker Bill's Trick Shooting =

1990 video game

- North American cover art
- Developer: Nintendo R&D1
- Publisher: Nintendo
- Composer: Hirokazu Tanaka
- Platform: Nintendo Entertainment System
- Release: NA: August 1990; EU: June 27, 1991
- Genre: Shooting
- Mode: Single-player

Barker Bill's Trick Shooting is a light gun shooter video game developed and published by Nintendo for the Nintendo Entertainment System in 1990.

== Gameplay ==
Flying Saucers game mode

Barker Bill's Trick Shooting consists of four carnival-type game modes in which the player uses a NES Zapper to shoot various objects for points. Higher scores are given for more daring shots: those on the verge of disappearing or breaking award the most points. The game modes consist of:

- Balloon Saloon

The player attempts to shoot balloons flying away while avoiding hitting the dog from Duck Hunt. Ballons are worth 100 points each.

- Flying Saucers

Barker Bill and his assistant Trixie will toss plates across the screen. The players must shoot the plates while avoiding Bill, Trixie, and the parrot. Plates are scored according to how close they are to the floor: from 100 very high up to 500 just above the floor.

- Window Pains

Assorted objects will fall down a screen full of windows, but some of the windows are closed, blocking the player's shots. He can only hit objects through open windows. Hits are scored according to the row the object is hit: from 100 at the top row to 500 on the bottom.

- Fun Follies

This involves progressing through the previous three in turn followed by two additional stages:

- Trixie's Shot (first seen in stage 4)

Trixie walks around the screen and occasionally presents coins. The players shoot the coins while trying not to hit her or the parrot. Points range from 100 to 500 points depending on how quickly they're shot after being presented; any coin she tosses away is always worth 500 points.
After playing Trixie's Shot, provided at least one diamond was earned, the player will go to a slot machine and pull the trigger to stop the slots. This is the only way to win extra chances in Fun Follies. Diamonds that the player collected in earlier stages (which do not give him extra chances in Fun Follies) allow for more winning lines and a better chance at a big prize. The player is awarded for all winning lines, allowing the potential (with at least two diamonds) for up to 15 extra chances.

- Bill's Thrills (first seen in stage 9)

Bill will throw objects like eggs and tomatoes high up. The players hit them before they reach Trixie, but must be careful of the parrot again. Scoring is higher due to the difficulty and depends on the size of the object thrown: from 800 for the relatively large tomato to 1,500 for the tiny egg.

The player will start each game with ten chances. Except during Fun Follies, they can gain a life by shooting a diamond. The player lose one chance for committing each of the following:

- Failing to hit a target.
- Hitting the wrong thing (such as a person or animal). The game is over when the player runs out of chances.

== Reception ==
Allgame gave the game a score of 3.5 stars out of 5. Game Freaks 365 gave it a rating of 83% (the equivalent of a B grade) in their 2005 review.

== See also ==
- List of Nintendo Entertainment System games
