= To the Earth =

1989 video game

- North American cover art
- Developer: Cirque Verte
- Publisher: Nintendo
- Platform: Nintendo Entertainment System
- Release: NA: November 1989; EU: February 23, 1990
- Genre: Light gun shooter
- Mode: Single-player

To the Earth is a light gun shooter video game developed by Cirque Verte and published by Nintendo for the Nintendo Entertainment System. It was released in November 1989 in North America and in Europe on February 23, 1990. It uses the NES Zapper to destroy ships and gain power-ups. The enemy spacecraft require good reflexes and aiming.

== Gameplay ==

The object of the game is to destroy incoming enemy spacecraft, bombs, missiles, and asteroids without destroying friendly vessels. Due to the very quick enemy ships and asteroids, the game is considered to be one of the most challenging NES Zapper games. The shield of the player's spacecraft constantly goes down with each missed shot at an enemy. Players can use a powerful bomb to destroy everything on screen, shoot a comet power-up that grants temporary protection from a limited number of hits, and a shield-repairing item dropped off by a friendly spacecraft. Game bosses are fought at the end of each level as the player moves through the Solar System. When the player reaches the Earth level, the player must battle and destroy the final boss, who is an alien named Nemesis. The goal is to retrieve vials of medicine and deliver them to the Earth while preventing Nemesis from passing through the planet's atmosphere.

The level locations are Uranus, Saturn, Jupiter, and Earth. At the conclusion, the player receives a congratulation message from Nester, who is the president of the terrestrial federation.

== Story ==
Taken directly from the American release of the game:

"It's 2050. The Ragossians have invaded the earth with a dastardly bacteriological weapon! The human race is facing the danger of extinction. You are on a special mission to bring the antibacterial agent from the Neptune-Terrestrial Allied Force base, 'Triton', to the Earth. You must break through the invaders' cordon. Time is limited! The fate of the earth is in your hands. Save it!"

== Reception ==
The game only received a few mixed reviews upon its release. The German publication Power Play gave the game a 36 out of 100 when it rated it in 1990. Brett Alan Weiss from Allgame said that the game requires full concentration and good shooting skills, but called it entertaining.
