= NES Zapper =

Video game light gun accessory

Zapper
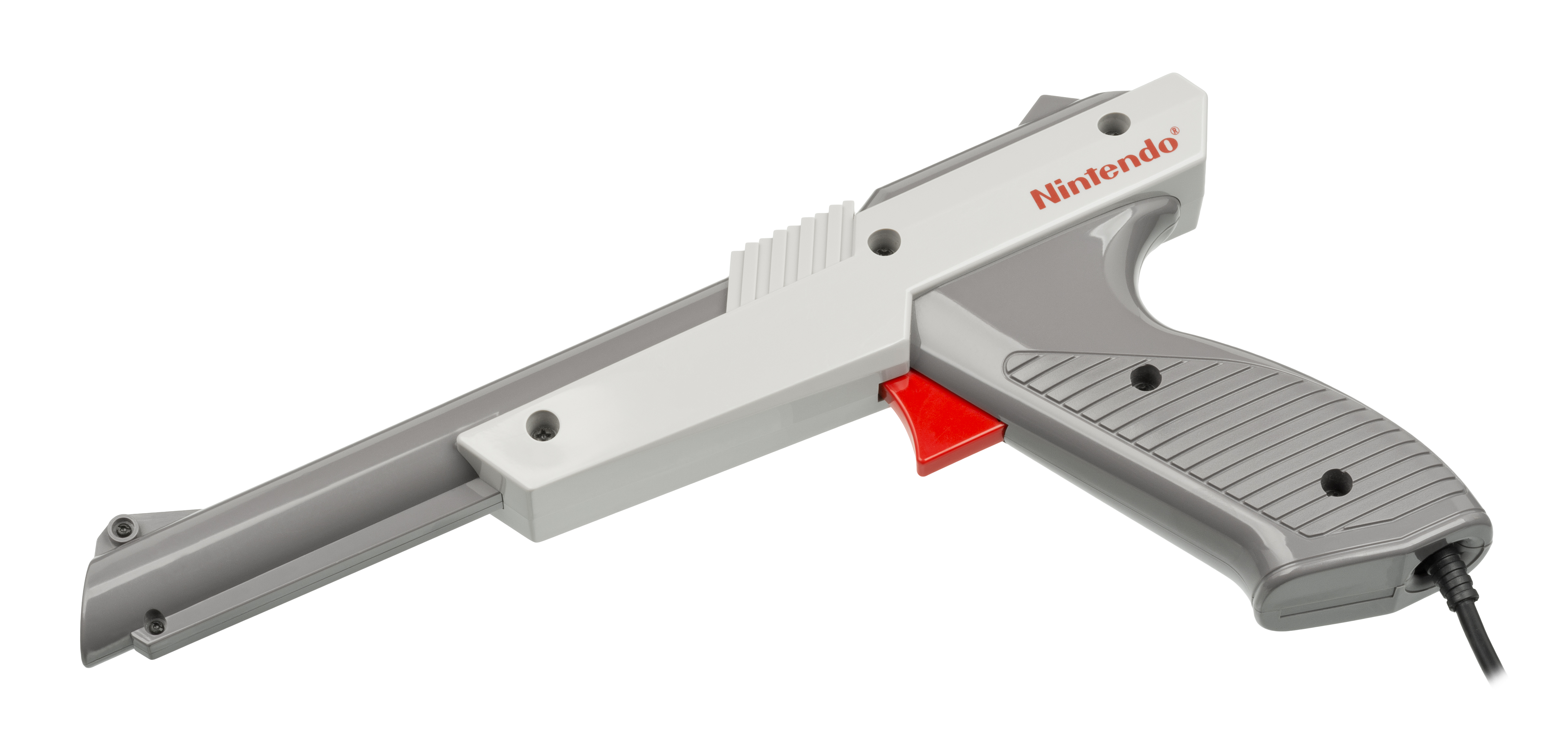
- The Zapper's original design
- Developer: Nintendo
- Type: Light gun
- Generation: Third generation
- Released: JP: February 18, 1984; NA: October 18, 1985; EU: 1986/1987
- Discontinued: Yes
- Connectivity: Famicom expansion port (Famicom); Controller socket (NES)
- Platform: Nintendo Entertainment System
- Marketing target: Toy, then video game
- Best-selling game: Duck Hunt
- Model Number: HVC-005 (Famicom); NES-005 (NES)
- Predecessor: Video Shooting Series light gun for Famicom
- Successor: Super Scope

The Zapper is an electronic light gun accessory launched within the Nintendo Entertainment System (NES) in North America on October 18, 1985. It is a cosmetic redesign by Nintendo of America's head designer Lance Barr, based on Gunpei Yokoi's Video Shooting Series light gun (光線銃シリーズガン, Kōsen jū shirīzugan), which had been released in Japan for the Famicom on February 18, 1984. The Zapper requires compatible NES games, such as Duck Hunt, Wild Gunman, Gumshoe, and Hogan's Alley. Its internal optical sensor allows the player to aim at a television set and accurately shoot at in-game targets.

The Zapper bridged Nintendo's existing library of hit arcade light-gun shooter games into the NES's launch library. As distinct toys, the Zapper and R.O.B. (Robotic Operating Buddy) were key to the identity of the NES bundle, for positioning the NES's 1985–1986 launch into the North American toy market instead of into the crashed video game market.

== Design ==
The original Japanese Kousenjuu Famicom light gun released in 1984

The Video Shooting Series light gun was designed for Famicom by Gunpei Yokoi and Satoru Okada of Nintendo R&D1, modeled realistically after a revolver. Its technology was based on the light gun toy used in Nintendo Beam Gun toy line, which in turn was based on the Colt Single Action Army revolver. The Video Shooting Series light gun is a double-action revolver with a moving hammer, which is automatically fired with a loud bang when the trigger is pulled without needing to cock the hammer.

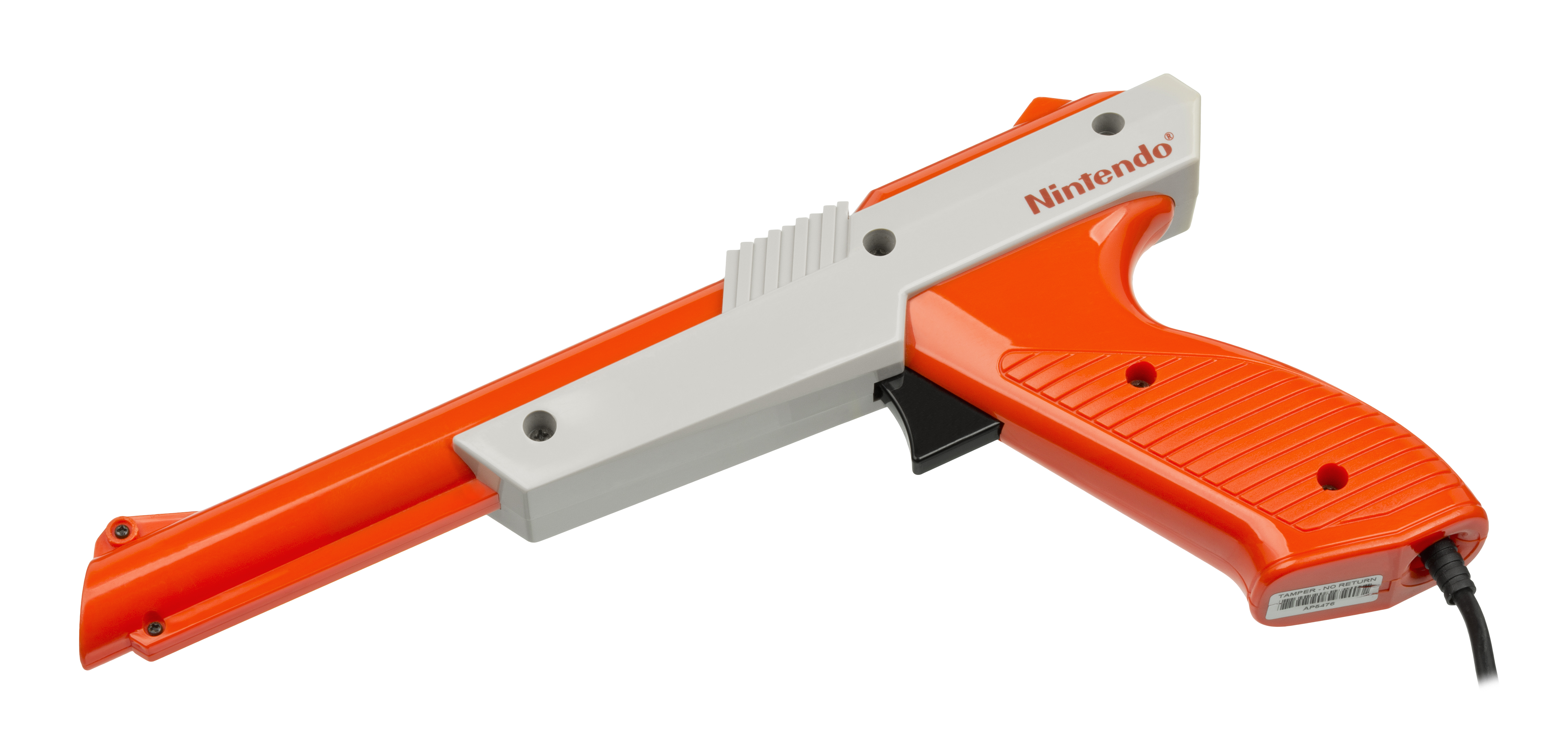
The orange design that was released in 1989

In North America, it was redesigned as the Zapper by Nintendo of America's head designer Lance Barr, to match the NES's color scheme and to resemble a futuristic science fiction ray gun. It has a dark gray barrel and grip. In 1988, the Federal Toy Gun Law required that toy guns be distinct from real guns, so a revised Zapper with an orange barrel and grip was released in 1989.

== History ==
The Video Shooting Series light gun was released for Famicom in Japan on February 18, 1984, bundled with Wild Gunman, and a holster accessory was released.

=== North America ===
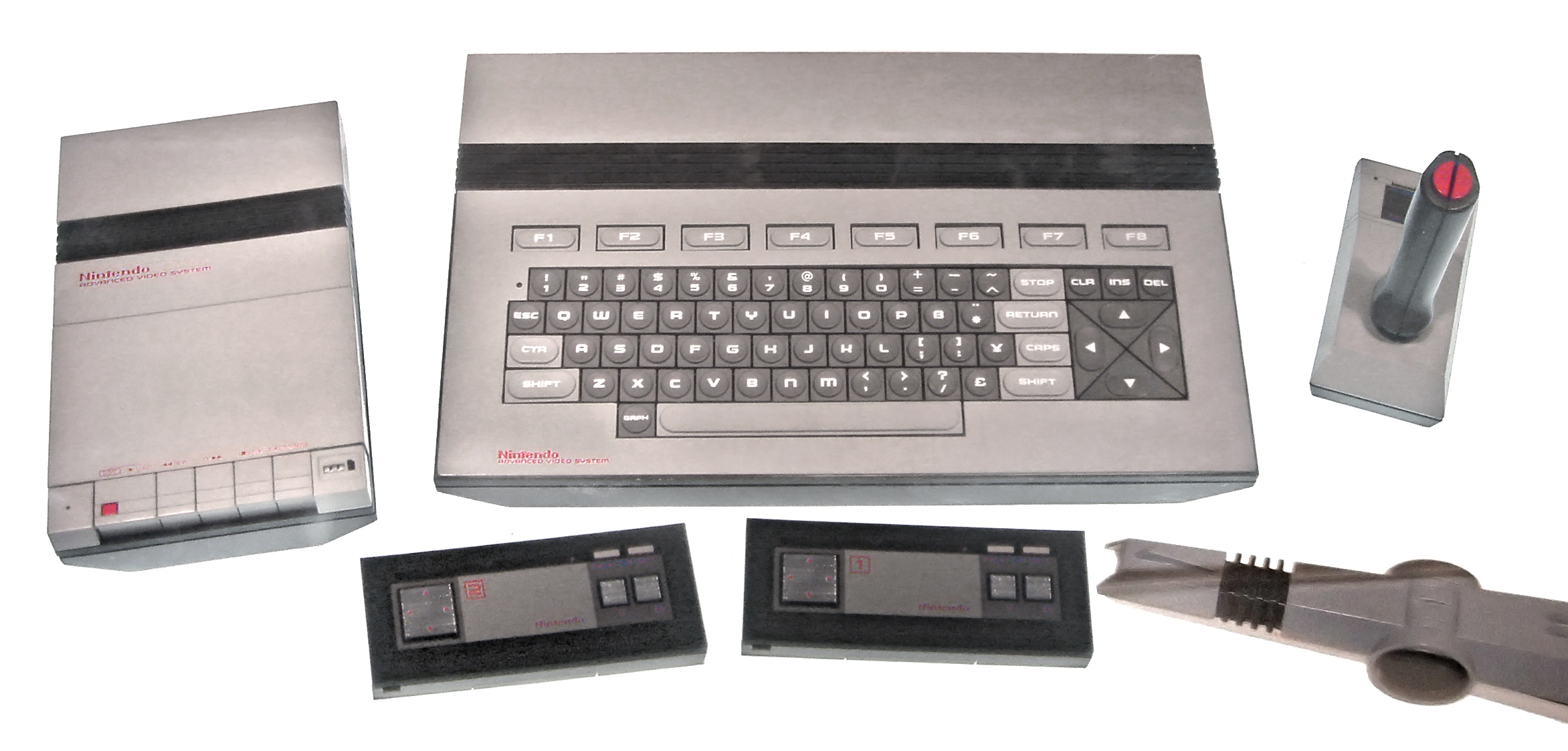
The prototype Advanced Video System and its accessories, including a wireless light gun

In January 1985, at the Winter Consumer Electronics Show (CES), Nintendo of America presented the Advanced Video System, a prototype American redesign of the Famicom, which was pitched as a high-end piece of consumer electronics. Its bundle of wireless peripherals includes a computer keyboard, music keyboard, and a combination light wand and gun. The "combination light wand and gun" has an adjustable handle for either mode. However, North American retailers were still apprehensive to re-enter the video game market after the video game crash of 1983, placing no orders.

After the poor reception at the Consumer Electronics Show, Nintendo revised its marketing strategy to avoid the crashed video game market in favor of the toy market, redesigning it as the Nintendo Entertainment System. Expensive wireless technology was abandoned, and the light gun and wand became the wired Zapper. The NES ports of Nintendo's existing hit arcade games Duck Hunt and Hogan's Alley were used to position the NES as a gun game instead of a video game system, and Nintendo Research & Development 1 developed the R.O.B. (Robotic Operating Buddy) accessory toy. On October 18, 1985, the NES was launched in the New York City test market, bundled with the Control Deck, Zapper, R.O.B., two controllers, Duck Hunt, and Gyromite. After successful launch in New York, the NES was gradually rolled out to other major markets in the United States, starting with Los Angeles in February 1986 and followed by other major American cities, culminating in the nationwide launch in July 1986.

In June 1986, the original launch bundle was rebranded as the Deluxe Set, and a cheaper bundle was launched with two controllers and Super Mario Bros. Now no longer bundled with every system, the Zapper and R.O.B. were made available for individual sale. In January 1988, at the Winter CES, the orange Zapper revision was announced (as had been required by the Federal Toy Gun Law of 1987) within the new Action Set bundle of the NES. Also announced was the third-party Zapper game Freedom Force. In June, at the Summer CES, the Power Set was announced for release that year, bundling the orange Zapper. In 1989, the orange Zapper was released.

=== Europe ===
The Zapper was sold throughout Europe in 1986-1987. They were released with a gray and orange finish.

European distribution was done by ASD and Bandai. Zappers were released in Europe as stand alone packages while “Deluxe Set” and “Action Set” packages were also retailed.

=== Accessories ===
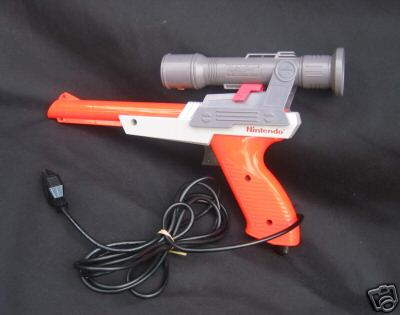
The Deluxe Sighting Scope on an orange NES Zapper

In North America, Bondwell released the Deluxe Sighting Scope, an accessory for the NES Zapper, under the brand name QuickShot. The scope is a sight that snaps onto the top of the NES Zapper.

The LaserScope

In 1990, Konami released the LaserScope, a headset accessory for use with the NES Zapper, in the United States and Japan. It is voice-activated, firing a shot whenever the wearer says "fire", although some reviewers criticized its ability to do so. The headset also includes stereo headphones for use with the NES and an eyepiece with a crosshair that sits in front of the wearer's right eye. It was designed for the game Laser Invasion, but works with any game compatible with the NES Zapper. In the United States, Laser Invasion came with a coupon for a $5 discount for the LaserScope.

=== Use in crime ===
In June 2023, a Zapper spray painted in black was used by David Joseph Dalesandro in robbing a Kwik Stop in Sharon, South Carolina. He was arrested by the York County Sheriff's Office and was charged with armed robbery with a deadly weapon and petty larceny.

== Games ==
Licensed

Title(s)	Developer(s)	Publisher(s)	Release date		
Title(s)	Developer(s)	Publisher(s)	JP	NA	PAL
The Adventures of Bayou Billy Mad City (JP)	Konami		August 12, 1988	June, 1989	January 24, 1991
Barker Bill's Trick Shooting	Nintendo R&D1	Nintendo	Unreleased	August, 1990	June 27, 1991
Day Dreamin' Davey	Sculptured Software	HAL Laboratory	Unreleased	June, 1992	Unreleased
Duck Hunt	Nintendo R&D1; Intelligent Systems	Nintendo	April 21, 1984	October 18, 1985	August 15, 1987
Freedom Force	Sunsoft		Unreleased	April 1, 1988	Unreleased
Gotcha! The Sport!	Atlus	LJN	Unreleased	November, 1987	Unreleased
Gumshoe	Nintendo R&D1	Nintendo	Unreleased	August, 1986	May, 1988
Hogan's Alley	Nintendo R&D1; Intelligent Systems	Nintendo	June 12, 1984	October 18, 1985	December 15, 1987
Laser Invasion Gun Sight (JP)	Konami		March 15, 1991	June, 1991	Unreleased
The Lone Ranger	Konami		Unreleased	August, 1991	Unreleased
Mechanized Attack	SNK		Unreleased	June, 1990	Unreleased
Operation Wolf	Taito		March 31, 1989	March, 1989	1992
Shooting Range	Tose	Bandai America	Unreleased	June, 1989	Unreleased
To the Earth	Cirque Verte	Nintendo	Unreleased	November, 1989	February 23, 1990
Track & Field II Konami Sports in Seoul (JP)	Konami		September 16, 1988	February, 1989	November 22, 1989
Wild Gunman	Nintendo R&D1; Intelligent Systems	Nintendo	February 18, 1984	October 18, 1985	February 15, 1988

Unlicensed

Title(s)	Developer(s)	Publisher(s)	Release date		
Title(s)	Developer(s)	Publisher(s)	JP	NA	PAL
Baby Boomer	Color Dreams	Color Dreams Gradiente (Brazil)	Unreleased	1989	1989
Chiller	Exidy	AGC (US) HES (AU)	Unreleased	1990	1990

== Gameplay ==
The Zapper can be pointed at a television set to interact with on-screen targets in games that support it. Games and game modes that support the Zapper are primarily shooting gallery games, although the sidescrolling platformers Gumshoe and Baby Boomer also support it. In some games, it can be used on the title screen to select a mode and start the game. Some games require the Zapper to be played (such as Duck Hunt, To the Earth, and Shooting Range), some can be played using either the Zapper or a controller (such as Operation Wolf and Mechanized Attack), and some have specific shooting-oriented levels that can be played using either the Zapper or a controller (such as The Adventures of Bayou Billy, Track & Field II, and Chiller).

Some NES games were co-promoted with or designed for particular alternative light gun accessories. In North America, Laser Invasion came with a coupon for a discount for the LaserScope headset, although it can also be played with the regular Zapper. The Japan-only Space Shadow was bundled with, and can uniquely use the speakers and haptic feedback of, the Hyper Shot light gun.

== Operation ==
When the Zapper's trigger is pressed, the game causes the entire screen to become black for one frame. Then, on the next frame, all valid targets that are on screen are drawn all white as the rest of the screen remains black. The Zapper detects this change in light level and determines if any of the targets are in its hit zone. If a target is hit, the game determines which one was hit based on the time of the flash, as each target flashes for one video frame, one after another.

The Zapper can only be used on CRT displays; it will not work on LCDs, plasma displays or other flat panel displays as they lack the rapid screen flickering that CRT televisions have.

== Reception ==
In February 1988, in a review of Gotcha! The Sport!, Computer Entertainer magazine commented that there was "always demand for a gun game [...] We know our Nintendo owners love games they can use with their Zappers". In July 1988, Computer Entertainer opined that Freedom Force was Sunsoft's "best game yet. And they've made the best use yet of the Zapper light gun by building a game around a theme that's as topical as the evening news: the taking of hostages by terrorists". Most of its survey respondents who own a game console also had a light gun. In August 1988, Antic magazine praised the Zapper's accuracy compared to the poor horizontal accuracy of the Atari XG-1 light gun, saying "if something is lined up in [Zapper's] sights, that's exactly what you hit".

Regarding Nintendo's Trojan Horse strategy to convince retailers to stock the NES by marketing it as a toy for its launch, historian Chris Kohler said "The gambit worked like a charm, and nobody missed R.O.B. or the Zapper once players realized that games played with the standard video game controller, like Super Mario Bros., were much more fun." Other commentators give more weight more to the promise to buy back any unsold stock. In the 2001 book The Ultimate History of Video Games, Steven L. Kent argues that "most of the 500 retailers who sold the NES that Christmas might not have taken the merchandise if it were not for a risky offer made by [Nintendo of America President Minoru] Arakawa himself—a money-back guarantee."

== Legacy ==
The Wii Zapper peripheral for the Wii console is a plastic casing for the Wii Remote attached to a Nunchuk that is held like a gun for point-and-shoot gameplay. It is not technically or visually similar to the Zapper. The Wii U Virtual Console re-releases of NES games can use the Wii Remote's pointer as a virtual Zapper.

The Wii U game Splatoon and its Nintendo Switch sequels Splatoon 2 and Splatoon 3 all include a family of weapons called the N-ZAP, which are recreations of the Zapper's design. The N-ZAP '85 and N-ZAP '89 use the gray and orange colors of the Zapper respectively, with the model numbers referencing the years both Zapper models released. The N-ZAP '83 appears in Splatoon and Splatoon 2 only, with the red and gold from the original Famicom controller, but shaped like the Zapper.

The Zapper has been cloned for use in several Famiclone consoles.

In 2006, the Tomee Zapper was released as the first clone of the Zapper. In January 2019, Hyperkin unveiled the Hyper Blaster HD, a Zapper clone that can used for NES consoles that are connected to modern TV displays.

== See also ==
- Light Phaser for Sega's Master System
