= Laser Invasion =

1991 video game

- North American cover art
- Developer: Konami
- Publisher: Konami
- Director: Nobuya Nakazato
- Programmers: Masato Maegawa (main programmer); Hideyuki Suganami (sub-programmer)
- Artists: Nobuya Nakazato; Kōichi Kimura
- Composers: Shigeru Fukutake (sound director); Atsushi Fujio; Tomoko Sumiyama (sound designer); Shigemasa Matsuo (sound assistant)
- Platform: Nintendo Entertainment System
- Release: JP: March 15, 1991; NA: June 1991
- Genre: Shooter
- Mode: Single-player

Laser Invasion, released as Gun Sight (ガンサイト) in Japan, is a multi-genre first-person action game released by Konami for the Nintendo Entertainment System in 1991. The player takes control of a military operative who pilots an attack helicopter in order to infiltrate various enemy bases and fulfill his mission. The game supports the standard NES controller, as well as the NES Zapper light gun and the LaserScope, a voice-activated headset controller Konami released for the NES that was compatible with all light gun games released for the system. The American version of the game featured a rebate for the LaserScope in the instruction booklet.

== Plot ==
A hostile nation is secretly planning to launch a new type of weapon against its enemies. As a member of a special armed force, the player's objective is to prevent the enemy from launching their weapon. The player's initial objective is to rescue a covert agent codenamed Spider, who has been captured in one of the enemy's bases.

== Gameplay ==
The game is composed of four missions with three different playing styles. The first is to come to the enemy area with an upgraded AH-64 Apache.

Before each mission begins, the player will receive a mission briefing from their commanding officer, who will explain the player's next mission objective. In all of the game's missions (with the exception of Mission 3, which takes place entirely in the air), the player must land their helicopter into enemy heliports and then infiltrate the enemy bases in order to fulfill a certain objective. After fulfilling their mission, the player must escape from the enemy's base.

The player can adjust the game's sounds, controls, and their number of lives in the option menu before starting the game. The game's gun shooting segments can be played with the Zapper or the LaserScope. When the player loses all of their lives, they will be given five chances to continue where they left off. The player can also gain extra lives by reaching certain scores.

=== Helicopter mode ===
The player begins each mission piloting a combat helicopter before landing on a heliport and infiltrating the enemy base on foot. Each mission begins with the player being asked to choose what kind of missiles to equip their helicopter with. The player can choose between 40 small missiles, 20 medium missiles, and 10 large missiles (giving the player a choice between greater quantity, greater firepower, or a balance between both). The player will then choose what kind of optional equipment to add to their helicopter (extra fuel, chaff grenades, or ground missiles). After its equipment has been chosen, the player's helicopter will them take off from its home base and fly into the enemy's airspace.

The player controls the helicopter from the pilot's perspective, with the top portion of the screen showing the player's current flightpath, as well as a gun sight for their helicopter's vulcan cannon and missiles. The bottom of the screen shows the helicopter's cockpit, which displays the player's fuel, damage condition, speed, missiles, equipment, and two kinds of radars. One of them is a Wide Area Radar which shows the overall area, displaying the player's current position, as well as the position of enemy and allied heliports and special targets. The other is an Immediate Range Radar which shows the proximity of nearby enemies. If enemies are approaching from behind, a danger lamp will turn on to warm the player.

The player's primary weapon is an M61 Vulcan cannon with unlimited ammunition. The player can switch between its missiles or its optional equipment and then use them during the middle of combat. By default, the helicopter will fly in top speed towards the player's current flightpath. In order to land into a heliport, the player must reduce their helicopter's speed until it stops completely and the helicopter is only hovering. The player must then try to align their sight into the heliport's landing spot and descend their copter as best as they can while managing with their current wind condition. If the player fails to land their copter correctly, they must try again. If the player lands into an allied heliport, their helicopter will be repaired and refuel and the player will be allowed to change their equipment.

The player will lose a life if their damage indicator or fuel runs out or if their helicopter is struck by an enemy missile. The player can use the chaff grenades to become invulnerable to enemy missiles for a limited period.

=== Gun shooting mode ===
When the player lands into an enemy heliport, their character will dismount from his helicopter and proceed to enter the perimeter of the enemy's base. The action in this segments are more straightforward, as the screen scrolls automatically to the right while several kinds of enemy soldiers attack the player. The player must attack all enemy soldiers who appear by shooting them with their handgun as they would in any other light gun shooting game. The bottom of the screen indicates the player's remaining health, as well as their remaining ammunition, both which can be replenished by picking up power-up items hidden inside weapon crates. The player can also shoot at certain oil drums to kill all on-screen enemies at once. These segments end when the player reaches the entrance of the base.

=== Maze mode ===
When the player completes a gun-shooting segment, the game switches playing style again, this time to a first-person exploration mode. In this mode, the player must navigate their character throughout the interior corridor of an enemy base to obtain vital items, including additional ammunition and health-restoring rations, while avoiding traps. Sometimes, the player will encounter their ally Spider, who will offer player information on how to complete their objective. When the player encounters enemy soldiers in these, it switches to a gun-shooting mode similar to the gun-shooting segments until all enemies are defeated. After the player has gotten what they needed to complete their mission, they must leave the base from where they began. The bottom part of the screen displays the player's map (which shows the areas that have been explored and the player's current position), their remaining health and ammo, and all the items they have collected.

== Regional differences ==
The Japanese Family Computer version, Gun Sight, includes a password feature that allows the player to begin at later missions. In contrast, the American NES version increased the number of continues from three to five and allows the player to adjust the starting number of lives from the default three to five. The Japanese version did not include support for the LaserScope, only allowing the player to use the standard controller or the Famicom's light gun.
