= Ring King =

1985 boxing video game

- North American arcade flyer
- Developer: Woodplace
- Publishers: JP: Woodplace; NA: Data East
- Platforms: Arcade, NES, MSX2, mobile phone
- Release: June 17, 1985: Arcade; JP: June 17, 1985; NA: December 1985 NES; JP: June 19, 1987; NA: September 1987 Arcade (VS. TKO Boxing); NA: 1987 MSX2; JP: 1988 Mobile phone; JP: 2004
- Genres: Sports (boxing)
- Modes: Single-player, multiplayer
- Arcade system: Nintendo VS. System (VS. T.K.O. Boxing)

Ring King, known as King of Boxer (Note: Japanese: キングオブボクサー, Hepburn: Kingu obu Bokusā) in Japan and Europe, is an arcade boxing game developed by Woodplace. It was published in 1985 by Woodplace in Japan and Europe, and by Data East in North America.

== Gameplay ==
The game continues the series' theme of comical sports as the player takes the role of a boxer who makes his way from his debut to become a world champion. Ring King, though perhaps unintentionally, is standard of the boxing creations of its era, via providing quirky monikers for opponents the player encounters; in its arcade release, these number eight (8): Violence Jo (this entry level fighter is the champion, in the NES version), Brown Pants, White Wolf, Bomba Vern, Beat Brown, Blue Warker (reigning champion, in the arcade version), Green Hante and Onetta Yank. Assuming the player wins the championship, arcade play continues cycling through only the last of the afore-listed three (Blue Warker, Green Hante, Onetta Yank).

The player can choose from several different types of punches and defensive maneuvers, along with unique special attacks. The player revives their stamina during the round interval by pressing the button rapidly. In the Nintendo port, the boxer's abilities are determined by three different stats; punch, stamina, and speed. The player can improve these stats using the power points gained after each match. Performing well in matches allows the player to create more powerful boxers. The player can save their game progress by recording a password, and two players can face off against each other in the two-player mode. Though the game is rudimentary, it is possible to counter-punch, and missing with too many punches causes the boxer's stamina to decrease.

=== Special attacks ===
The biggest characteristic of the game is the comical set of special attacks. These moves are activated when the player presses the attack button at the right timing and at the right distance. The attacks have the capability to instantly knock out the opponent, but being countered before a special attack causes an extraordinary amount of damage as well. The first special attack is a powerful hook which the boxer throws by spinning around like a top. The second is a straight punch that propels the opponent into the ropes when it connects. The third type is an uppercut that launches the opponent straight into the air. If thrown at the right timing, the uppercut can blast the opponent straight out of the ring, resulting in a technical knockout.

== Ports ==
Ring King was later ported to the Nintendo Entertainment System (Famicom in Japan) in 1987, which was published by Namco in Japan and by Data East in North America. This version was also released on the VS. UniSystem as VS. TKO Boxing in North America in 1987. Sony later ported it to the MSX2 exclusively in Japan in 1988. The Famicom and MSX2 versions were released as the third game of the Family sports game series, after Family Stadium and Family Jockey for the Famicom in Japan by Namco as Family Boxing (ファミリーボクシング, famirī bokushingu). The game was later converted into an i-mode mobile phone application and released exclusively in January 2004 by Namco.

== Reception ==
Ring King's sales had surpassed 250,000 copies in the United States by 1988, for which it received a Platinum Award from the Software Publishers Association (SPA) in August 1988.

== See also ==
- List of boxing video games
