= Laser Clay Shooting System =

Light gun shooting simulation game by Nintendo

- Type: Light gun shooter
- Invented by: Hiroshi Yamauchi, Gunpei Yokoi
- Company: Nintendo
- Country: Japan
- Availability: 1973–1978
- Materials: Laser Clay Shooting System; Overhead projector, rifle Mini Laser Clay; 16mm film projector, rifle or revolver, arcade cabinet

The Laser Clay Shooting System (レーザークレー射撃システム) is a light gun shooting simulation game created by Nintendo in 1973. The game consisted of an overhead projector which displayed moving targets behind a background; players would fire at the targets with a rifle, in which a mechanism of reflections would determine whether or not the "laser shot" from the rifle hit the target.

The concept behind the Laser Clay Shooting System came from Hiroshi Yamauchi, while Gunpei Yokoi was behind the development of the system. It was released in deserted bowling alleys in Japan in 1973; upon release, it was a commercial success, but the success of the system quickly evaporated as a result of the 1973 oil crisis and the ensuing recession in Japan, which left Nintendo ¥5 billion in debt and on the verge of bankruptcy. In 1974, Yamauchi, in an attempt to revive Nintendo, released a smaller, cheaper version of the Laser Clay Shooting System, titled "Mini Laser Clay". Deployed mostly in arcades, players shoot moving targets, provided by a 16mm film projector, at an arcade cabinet. This system featured several games and achieved significant success for Nintendo throughout the 1970s, which helped the company out of its financial situation.

The laser shooting idea was subsequently taken up by other manufacturers. The principle of a laser gun, which fires beams of light at a reflective target, inspired pigeon clay shooting simulators, where the pigeon clays are replaced with reflective flying disks. The product of this type was an analogue system developed by UK company Lasersport. In the early 2020s, a digital laser clay shooting system was developed by SLR Games, also a UK manufacturer.

== Overview ==
The Laser Clay Shooting System was a shooting simulation that was present in many former bowling alleys in Japan. In the simulation, players fire their laser rifles at moving targets produced by an overhead projector. A series of reflections determines whether or not the target was hit by the "laser shot"; when a hit is registered, the projector displays a picture of a destroyed target.

The Laser Clay Shooting System was redesigned in 1974 and was renamed "Mini Laser Clay". This game would be displayed in arcades as opposed to bowling alleys. Mini Laser Clay consisted of two shooting ranges in which up to four players could play simultaneously. Players would pay ¥100 to shoot ten clay pigeons with two shots per pigeon; players would "pull" each clay pigeon by stepping on a button near their feet. High scores would earn players tokens which could be exchanged for prizes. Cheaper models of Mini Laser Clay featured single players who would shoot targets, projected by a 16mm film, at an arcade cabinet with a revolver.

== History ==
The idea for the Laser Clay Shooting System Game started in 1971, when Hiroshi Yamauchi read a newspaper article about shooting (also referred to as "Ball Trap") competitions. He then asked his assistant Gunpei Yokoi about the possibility of using their current product, the "Opto-Electronic Gun SP", for shooting simulations. Days after Yamauchi's request, Yokoi asked Yamauchi to buy him a rifle for the purposes of designing an "electronic Ball Trap simulation" by using the rifle as a prototype. Assisting in the development were Masayuki Uemura and Genyo Takeda. The project was approved in 1971 and was dubbed the "Laser Clay Shooting System".

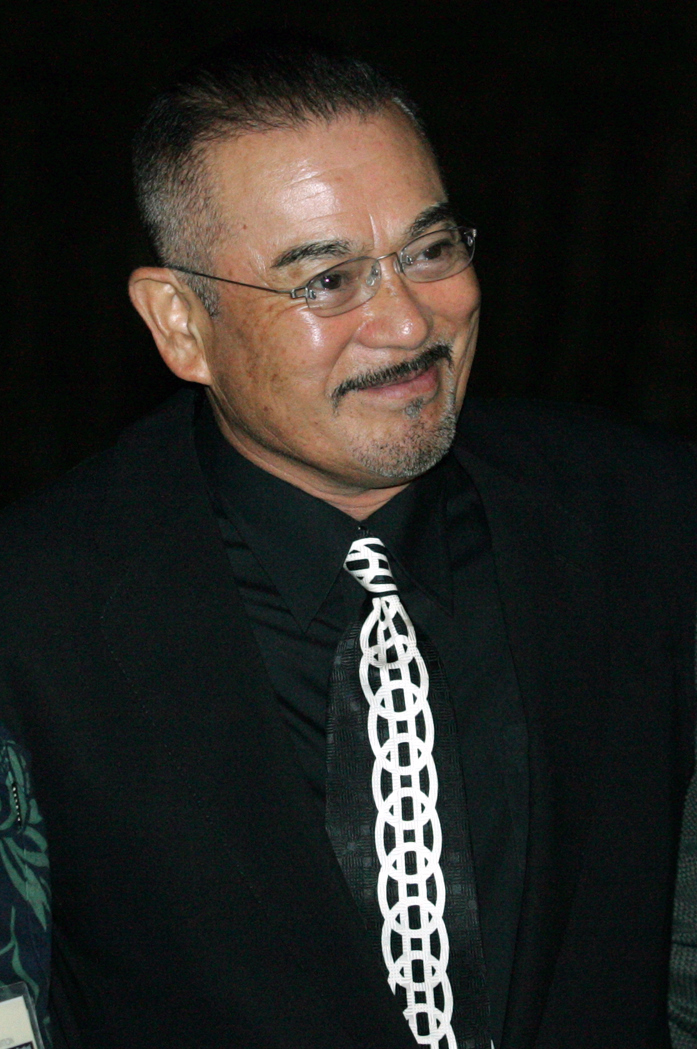
Advertisements for The Laser Clay Shooting System often featured Japanese actor and martial arts expert Sonny Chiba.

Yamauchi wanted to see shooting simulations developed in deserted bowling alleys in Japan; bowling in Japan was a 1960s fad which was replaced by karaoke by the end of that decade. The first Laser Clay Shooting System was unveiled to the public in early 1973, despite technical setbacks which were fixed in extremis on the same day it was unveiled. Nintendo proceeded to buy out deserted bowling alleys in various strategic locations, in which they were fitted with the simulation system. Costing between ¥4 and ¥4.5 million to install, each system included overhead projectors which displayed airborne targets behind a mountainous or forest landscape, and a mechanism that consisted of reflections which detected whether or not the "laser shot" hit the flying target on the projector.

Yamauchi was successful in the first few weeks of operation, as his "test locations" were running at capacity. In February 1973, with imminent success of the Laser Clay Shooting System, Yamauchi established a new Nintendo subsidiary, Nintendo Leisure System Co., Ltd., to handle the maintenance and orders of the system. He then continued to buy out more former bowling alleys and fitted them with Laser Clay Shooting Systems, and the subsidiary had many pre-orders for them. As a result, the factories dedicated to building these systems were running at capacity around the clock in order to meet public demand. Advertising for the Laser Clay Shooting System featured Japanese actor and martial artist Sonny Chiba.

However, in October, OPEC dramatically raised the price in oil, which would eventually trigger the 1973 oil crisis. As a result, the Japanese economy, which imported over 98% of their requirements for oil, was forced to scale back on all unnecessary amenities in anticipation of an imminent recession. As a result, Nintendo received cancellation requests of the Laser Clay Shooting System from its clients, and, in less than a year, nearly all of its orders were cancelled. Having invested billions of Yen in their product, Nintendo's profits were cut in half, and they found themselves ¥5 billion (or $64 million) in debt, in which Yamauchi would spend 7 years paying off. Yamauchi would cancel his "electronic Ball Trap" project as a result, and Nintendo's future was uncertain. What kept Nintendo (and Yamauchi) going was that they were listed on the stock market, and Nintendo still had to answer to shareholders, some of whom continued their support of the floundering company.

In 1974, as Laser Clay had still maintained some popularity in Japan, Yamauchi redesigned the Laser Clay Shooting System into a smaller and cheaper version, and dubbed it "Mini Laser Clay". This redesigned system was intended for arcades. Yamauchi pitched to professionals: "With such a machine in your arcade venue, you will undoubtedly draw the attention of the whole neighbourhood". Since orders from arcades were low, Nintendo needed cheaper methods to make the product. As a result, Yokoi came up with the idea of using 16mm projectors and video; this allowed the system to be sold in the form of arcade cabinets. In 1974, Wild Gunman, the first game of its kind, was released. Alongside Wild Gunman, Nintendo designed an adult version of the game titled Fascination; instead of cowboys, the game featured a Swedish woman in an evening dress who would dance around on the projection. Then, when the women struck a pose, players would shoot off key parts of her clothing until she was completely nude. The game was never released to the general public.

While the Mini Laser Clay system started slow, Nintendo eventually garnered sufficient sales, and they continued to sell the system to more arcades. In 1976, Shooting Trainer was released on this system, attracting many international players; this was followed by New Shooting Trainer in 1978. Other games released for the Mini Laser Clay system included Sky Hawk (1976), Battle Shark (1977), and Test Driver (1977). Wild Gunman and Shooting Trainer were distributed in North America by Sega in 1976.

Some sources say that Kōsenjū Duck Hunt (1976) was part of the Laser Clay Shooting System, while others say that it was part of the "Nintendo Beam Gun Series" – a separate project to bring shooting simulations into the home. According to Gizmodo, it was part of a revamping of the Laser Clay Shooting System.

== Reception ==
In Japan, several Laser Clay games were among the highest-grossing arcade games of 1976 in Japan, with Sky Hawk, Mini Laser Clay and Wild Gunman being the fourth, fifth and sixth highest electro-mechanical games (EM games), respectively (below Namco's F-1, TOGO's Mogura Taiji and Sega's Group Skill Diga). The following year, Shooting Trainer and Laser Clay were the sixth and seventh highest-grossing arcade EM games of 1977, respectively, and among the year's top three shooters (below Namco's Shoot Away).

In North America, Wild Gunman was one of the most popular arcade machines at the AMOA 1976 show. The following year, Shooting Trainer was the 17th highest-grossing arcade game of 1977 in the United States, according to Play Meter, and the third highest electro-mechanical game on the list (below Namco's F-1 and Allied Leisure's Daytona 500).

== See also ==
- Light gun shooter
- Duck Hunt
