= Shooting Range (video game) =

1989 video game

- Developer: Tose
- Publisher: Bandai
- Platform: Nintendo Entertainment System
- Release: NA: June 1989
- Genre: Shoot 'em up
- Mode: Single-player

Shooting Range is a video game for the Nintendo Entertainment System published by Bandai in June 1989.

== Gameplay ==
Shooting Range consist of Normal Game, where players need to shoot pinwheel targets attached to various characters within a time limit with four stages in total. Party Game is where players accumulate the most points by shooting all the targets within the allotted time.

The game uses the NES Zapper for controls.
