= Hogan's Alley (FBI) =

FBI training facility

Coordinates: 38.527684°N 77.448620°W

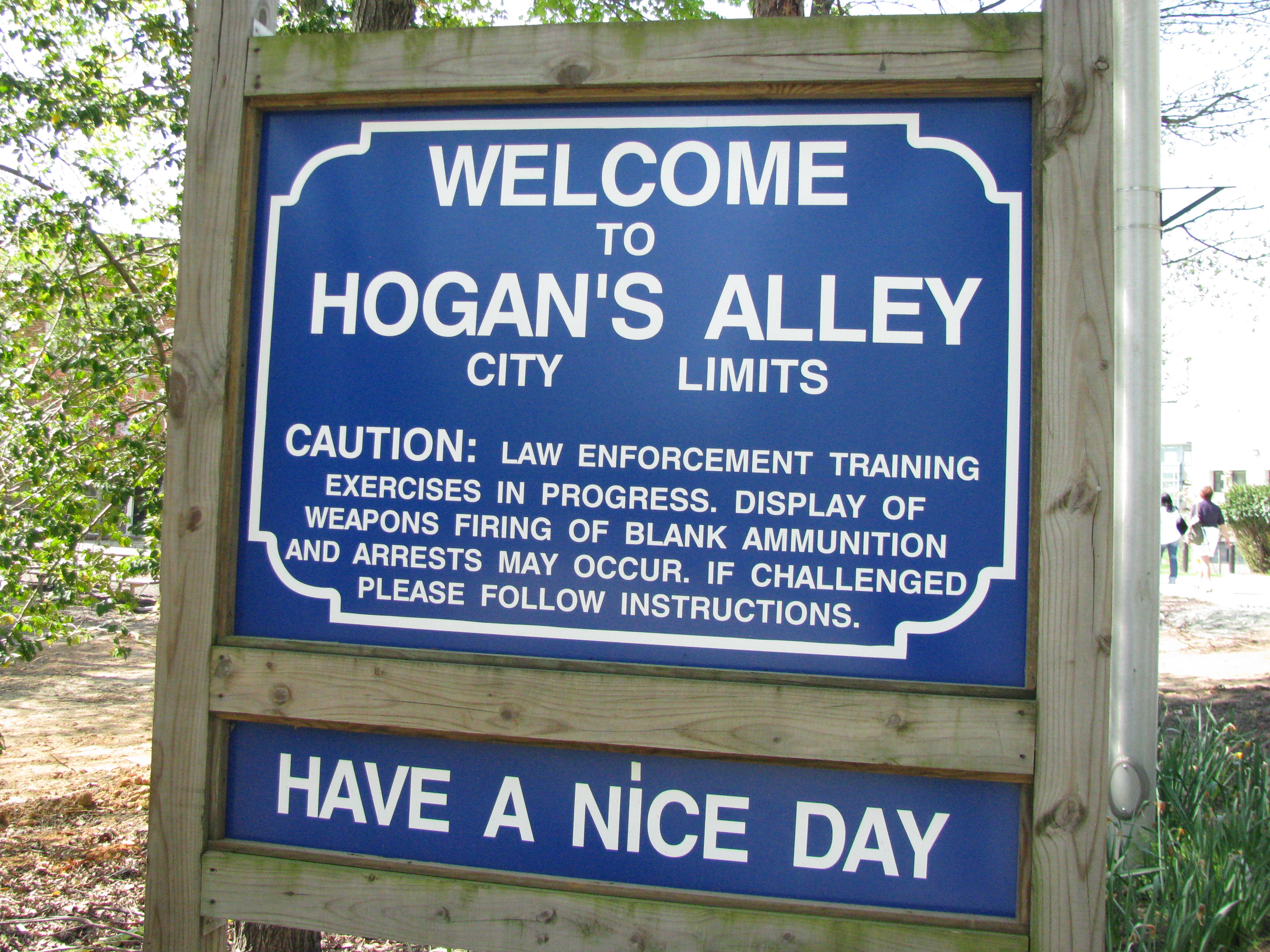
Town sign at the entrance of Hogan's Alley

Hogan's Alley is a Federal Bureau of Investigation training facility operated by the FBI Academy in Marine Corps Base Quantico near Quantico, Prince William County, Virginia. Opened in 1987, Hogan's Alley is a full-scale replica of a nondescript town in the United States, spread over approximately 10 acres (4 ha). The facility is used to train federal law enforcement agents in realistic urban environments that cannot be fully emulated by, or would not be fitting in, traditional training facilities such as kill houses. The "Hogan's Alley" name originated from Hogan's Alley, a popular 1890s comic strip by Richard F. Outcault that centered around the titular fictional slum alley in New York City.

== Description ==
Hogan's Alley is located on the grounds of the FBI Academy, roughly behind the FBI Laboratory. The facility is an open-air complex consisting of several buildings constructed to resemble establishments typically seen in an archetypical American small town, including a post office, a pharmacy, a motel, a fully-operational Subway, a pawn shop, a pool hall, a laundromat, a barber, a jewelry store, a bar, a movie theater, and a suburban cul-de-sac, among other businesses and structures, several of which are named after or resemble locations, events, and figures from the FBI's history. Although it strongly resembles a town, Hogan's Alley is not actually inhabited nor incorporated, and most of the buildings are either prop-filled sets or disguised academy facilities such as classrooms and offices. Still, some genuine confusions have happened: the prop mailboxes in Hogan's Alley reportedly had real mail regularly placed in them by confused postal workers, to the point that the FBI ordered them welded shut to stop the mail deliveries; and a contracted painter working at Hogan's Alley once attempted to purchase a car from the facility's fake car dealership, apparently unaware it was not actually for sale.

On any given day now, you might see new agents negotiating a hostage situation at the Dogwood Inn motel—while Hostage Rescue Team operators sweep through the movie theater as role players playing potential witnesses are interviewed in the theater lobby. Meanwhile, the DEA may be training downstairs, and the FBI's Victim Services Division is two blocks away in the houses training victim specialists on how to properly conduct in-person death notifications.

— FBI News article from 2024 describing the diverse uses of Hogan's Alley

Hogan's Alley is used to teach agents investigative techniques, firearms skills, and defensive tactics. Scenarios taught using Hogan's Alley are diverse and include criminal investigations, evidence processing, conducting interviews and searches, police standoffs, crisis negotiation, raids, stakeouts, apprehension operations, close-quarters battle, and following police rules of engagement. The facility is also used to trial new tactics and strategies before they are used operationally. During training exercises, Hogan's Alley is "populated" by agents, professional actors, and local residents who roleplay parts appropriate to the scenarios, such as suspects, robbers, terrorists, drug dealers, hostages, civilians, and local law enforcement. Use of firearms is mostly simulated using blank rounds, simunitions, paintballs, and projected targets used in tandem with recoil-simulating light guns, though Hogan's Alley is also used for live fire exercises.

Hogan's Alley is primarily used by FBI Academy classes and new recruits, though other frequent users include FBI Special Weapons and Tactics Teams, the Hostage Rescue Team, the security details assigned to protect the FBI director and U.S. Attorney General, recruit classes of the Drug Enforcement Administration (whose academy is located across from the FBI Laboratory), and personnel from other law enforcement agencies. The facility is also occasionally used to train lieutenants at the United States Marine Corps Basic School in urban warfare.

== History ==
The first reference to a training facility called "Hogan's Alley" was a shooting range at Camp Perry near Port Clinton, Ohio. Apparently first constructed around 1919 for a series of shooting contests called the National Matches, Hogan's Alley was designed to resemble either a destroyed French village or "a street in a slum section of a town". The shooter would walk through the alley and shoot pop-up targets that would appear from behind doors, windows, walls, and chimneys. Its law enforcement connection arose from its frequent use by the Special Police School, a marksmanship-centric police academy established at Camp Perry in 1926 by the National Rifle Association and the National Board for the Promotion of Rifle Practice to help train police officers (who, at the time, were reported to have lacked dedicated marksmanship programs as part of their training) and FBI agents in firearm techniques. During World War II, the Special Police School was closed and Camp Perry was used as a prisoner-of-war camp; when the Special Police School was reopened in 1956, Hogan's Alley was not part of its facilities, and the School declined into the 1960s as more police forces adopted their own marksmanship training programs.

When the first FBI Academy was constructed in Quantico in 1939, it did not feature simulated environments similar to Hogan's Alley, but in 1945 a "surprise target range" with similar electronically-controlled pop-up targets was constructed on the academy grounds. In the early 1950s, to process an influx of new agents with the start of the Cold War, Henry L. Sloan, special agent in charge of firearms training, recommended an expansion of the academy's shooting ranges to Assistant Director Hugh H. Clegg, including one called "Hogan's Alley". This range was clearly inspired by the Camp Perry rendition, and was a 120-foot façade of six house-like structures featuring similar life-size photographic pop-up targets positioned in the windows and doors; agents had to decide whether to shoot based on the circumstances. Construction of this rendition of Hogan's Alley was completed in April 1954.

When the modern FBI Academy was constructed in 1972, it also did not originally contain facilities similar to the previous Hogan's Alley ranges. The decision to construct a modern rendition of Hogan's Alley arose in the 1980s in the aftermath of the 1986 FBI Miami shootout, in which two FBI agents were killed and five others were wounded after they were outgunned in a shootout while attempting to apprehend a pair of violent bank robbers in Pinecrest, Florida. The shootout indicated that FBI agents had to handle more "shoot-don't-shoot" situations than regular police officers, and that they needed more diverse and realistic training scenarios to avoid a repeat of the incident. Funding to build a new training facility for this purpose was allocated to the FBI shortly after. The FBI sought the advice and assistance of Hollywood set designers in the planning and construction of Hogan's Alley, to ensure the town looked and felt as real as possible. The facility was completed and opened for use in 1987.

Since its opening, Hogan's Alley has been expanded upon with additional environments to increase the possible training scenarios and better suit the evolving nature of crime and terrorism. A cul-de-sac featuring suburban-style houses of varying designs was added to the facility in the early 2000s. In 2024, Hogan's Alley was updated to include a nightclub, a movie theater with a proper interior (the existing one was a disguised office), and adjoining rooms and corridors that could be modified to resemble different interiors such as schools and offices, to help with active shooter training.

== See also ==
- Hogan's Alley – 1984 video game simulating a pop-up shooting range, based on the 1954 Hogan's Alley
- Marine Corps Air Ground Combat Center Twentynine Palms – USMC facility that includes a large replica of a Middle Eastern town
- Metropolitan Police Specialist Training Centre – similar facility operated by the Metropolitan Police in Gravesend, England
