= R.O.B. =

Video game console peripheral

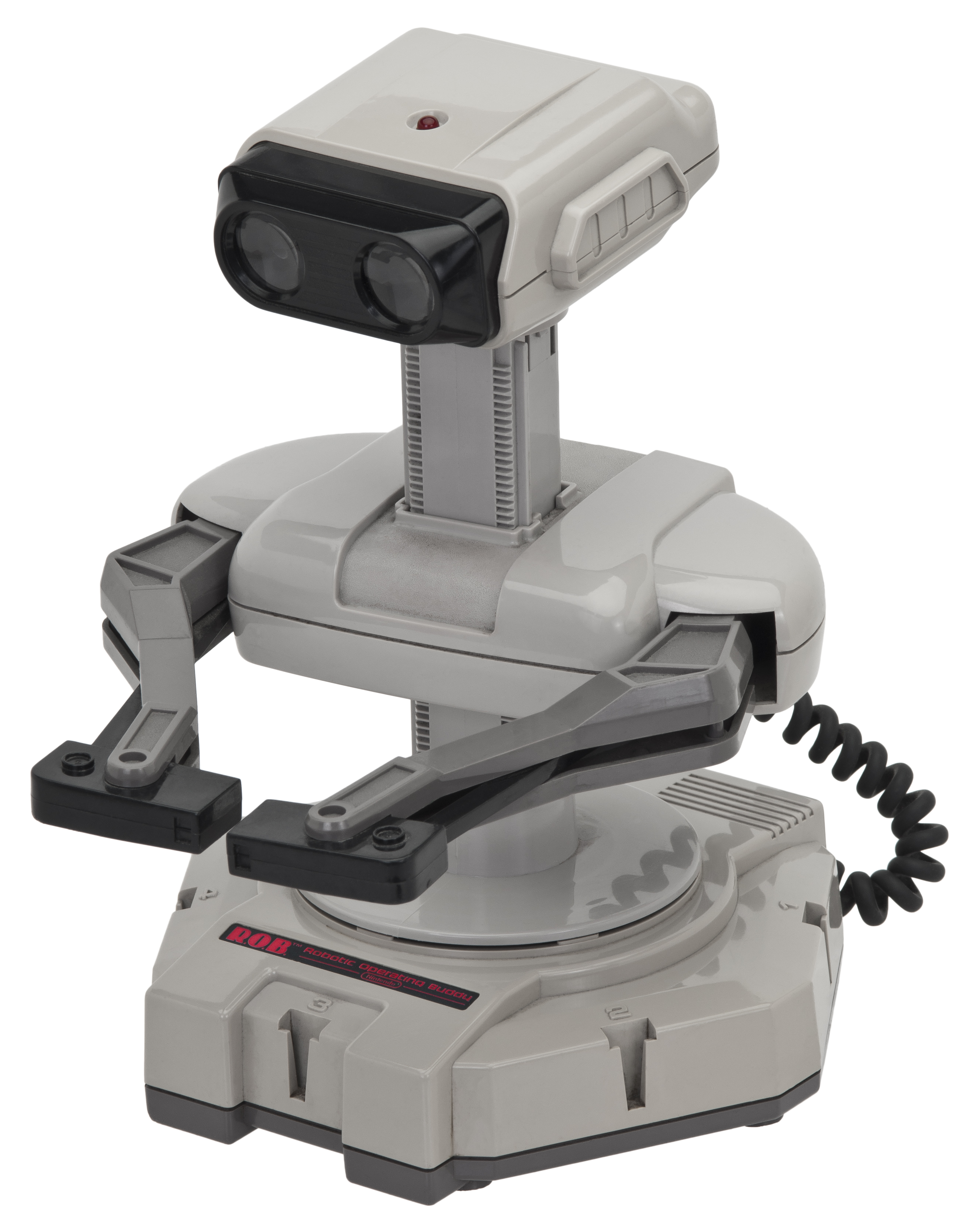
- R.O.B. with the NES color scheme.
- Also known as: Robotic Operating Buddy; Family Computer Robot
- Manufacturer: Nintendo
- Type: Video game controller
- Generation: Third generation
- Released: JP: July 26, 1985; NA: October 18, 1985; EU: September 1, 1986
- Operating system: Nintendo Entertainment System
- Best-selling game: Gyromite

R.O.B. (Robotic Operating Buddy) is a toy robot accessory for the Nintendo Entertainment System (NES). He (Note: R.O.B., in spite of being an inanimate object in real life, is usually referred to with male pronouns as a fictional character. Because of it, this article refers to him with male pronouns for consistency.) was a key to the NES's launch in October 1985, as a redesign of the Family Computer Robot (Note: Japanese: ファミリーコンピュータ ロボット, Hepburn: Famirī Konpyūta Robotto) which had been launched in July 1985 in Japan for Famicom and was available as part of the Deluxe Set until 1988. During its short lifespan, only two games in the Robot Series were released: Gyromite and Stack-Up.

Following the North American video game crash of 1983, Nintendo courted a fearful retail market by rebranding its Japanese Famicom video game console as the Nintendo Entertainment System—a new platform focused on R.O.B. to further reclassify the system as a uniquely sophisticated toy experience instead of simply as a video game console. Computer Entertainer called R.O.B. "the world's only interactive robot".

The NES's extensive marketing plan immediately and successfully centered on R.O.B., with the October 1985 test market launch in Manhattan, New York. This was Nintendo's debut in the North American video game console market, which eventually revitalized the entire video game industry. R.O.B. was quietly discontinued a few years later, and became remembered as a successful Trojan Horse of marketing. He is a cameo or playable character in many Nintendo games such as the Super Smash Bros. series, and appears in the 2026 film The Super Mario Galaxy Movie, voiced by Ed Skudder.

== History ==
=== Development ===
R.O.B.'s page from Nintendo's pre-announcement brochure was intended to attract distributors at CES in June 1985, and show his flagship status within the company's launch strategy.

The new Nintendo of America subsidiary, having already successfully bet its own launch upon its conversion of its failed Radar Scope (1980) arcade game cabinets into the successful new Donkey Kong (1981) arcade game, wanted to debut in the home video game console market using the Japanese parent company's successful Famicom system. But the entire American video game industry, which had been devastated by the video game crash of 1983, first needed a relaunch.

Following the crash, many retailers had lost confidence in the Atari-led video game market even while the toy market was strong. With a high volume of low quality products and dead-inventory shovelware, some retailers and industry critics considered video gaming to be a passing fad altogether. Therefore, Nintendo spent much of 1984 re-conceiving its Family Computer (Famicom) platform from Japan to be portrayed in America not as a traditional video game console, but as a new kind of sophisticated entertainment experience.

Nintendo saw the industry's overwhelming trend away from game consoles and toward home computers, but its prototype of a lavish Famicom-based home computer and multimedia package called Advanced Video System (AVS) was poorly received at the January 1985 Winter Consumer Electronics Show, so that was redesigned into a cost-reduced toy motif. The Famicom's whimsical appearance was again rebranded with a serious naming and industrial design language similar to the AVS, called the Nintendo Entertainment System (NES). The NES is based on the Control Deck game console, which is shaped like high-tech videophile equipment with a front-loaded and door-enclosed cartridge port in the style of the modern VCR instead of a typically top-loaded "video game console".

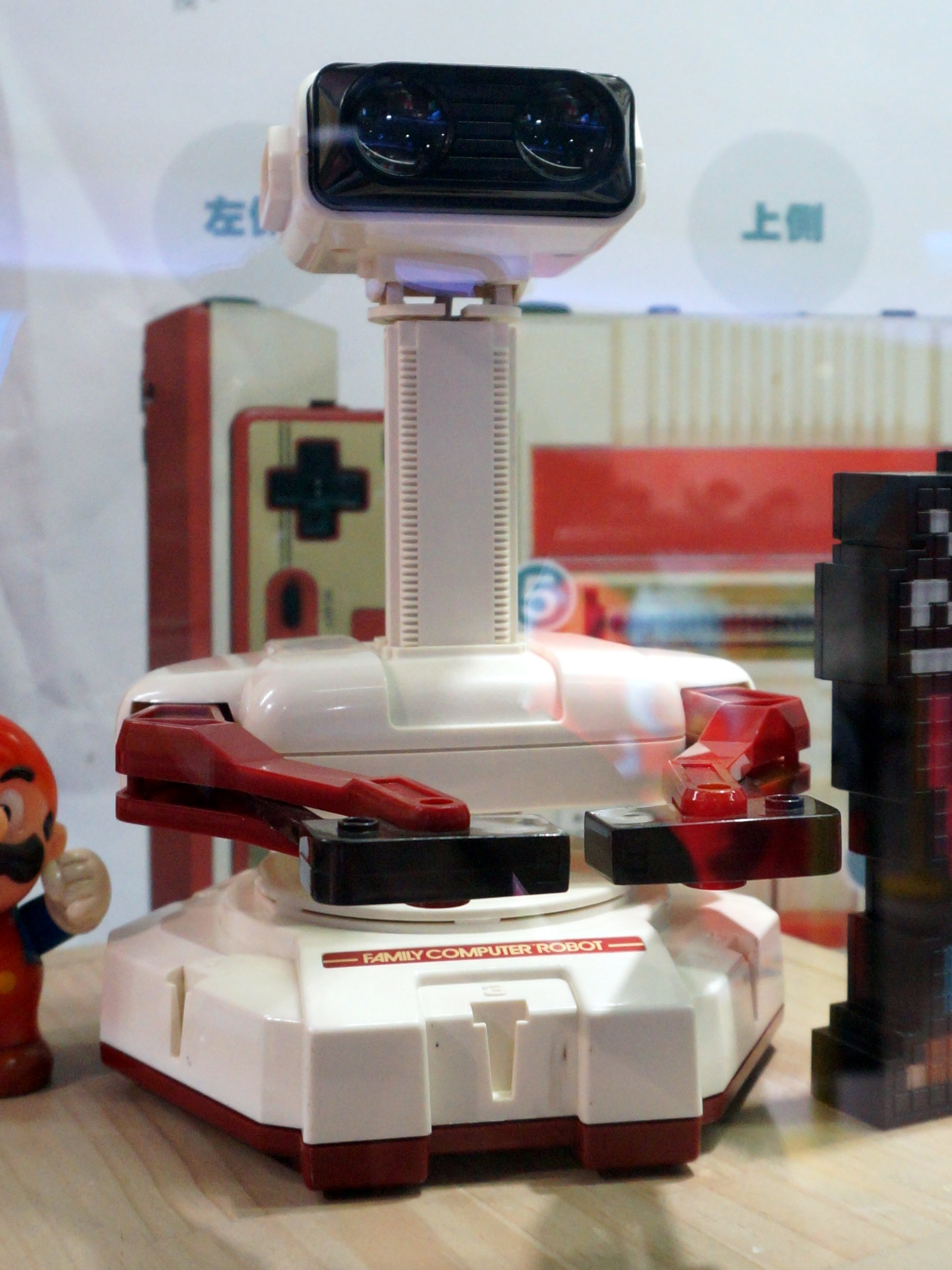
The Japanese Family Computer Robot on display.

The Family Computer Robot, a recent niche entry in the Famicom's aftermarket accessory lineup in Japan on July 26, 1985, is a mechanized toy robot with working arms and crude eyesight, resembling "a cross between E.T. and R2-D2". It was designed and patented by veteran Nintendo designer Gunpei Yokoi. Used as a functional companion for playing select video games within a custom playset, it was recolored for the NES and was thrust forth as essential to the NES's new identity as a futuristic, robot-powered experience. The Milwaukee Journal said, "The key to the NES is the interactive robot ... You no longer have to fight only the aliens on the screen; you have a robot to contend with as well." Computer Entertainer called it "the world's only interactive robot", because no other video game system or home computer package ever had one, greatly distinguishing the NES to retailers and consumers alike.

Nintendo of America staff received the first R.O.B. shipment from Japan, initially thrilled with anticipation while unboxing and using the robot. Howard Phillips remembered, "The technology was so cool! [...] like voodoo magic [...] But then his actual motion was just hysterically slow." Nintendo marketing executive Gail Tilden recalled, "That thing was definitely like watching grass grow. It was so slow, and to try and stand there and sales-pitch it in person and try to make it exciting; you had to have the eyes lined up just right or it wouldn't receive the flashes. It was kind of a challenge." Product designer Don James laughed, "[Gyromite] was hard as hell! [...] So you really had to think two or three moves ahead to allow him to do what he was going to do. But it's cool to look at, right? [...] It was a really neat, unusual little device. And it was fun to play! But again, like Rock 'em Sock 'em Robots, I wouldn't want to do it for 40 hours." Tasked with all of the NES's naming and branding, the sole marketing staff member Gail Tilden said the name was "originally going to be OTTO, which was a play on the word 'auto'", but she settled on Robotic Operating Buddy, or R.O.B.

As the centerpiece of the new NES platform, R.O.B. was revealed at the Summer Consumer Electronics Show in Chicago in June 1985. Nintendo's brochure for attracting distributors shows a prototypical hybrid between AVS and NES with R.O.B., saying, "The future of home entertainment is staring you in the face. Our new video robot is the first of a long line of winners to come from Nintendo." and that R.O.B. is the "star of a new Entertainment System that's programmed to make you rich". The robotic persona reportedly "worked like a charm" to drive intrigued visitors to Nintendo's booth, but nobody signed up to be a distributor of the upcoming NES.

IGN reflected that "[R.O.B.] might have been the key to getting the system into players' hands, and once they had players, Nintendo was convinced the rest would be easy."

=== Release ===
Nintendo anticipated that R.O.B.'s flair for futurism, personality, and physicality was so crucial to the success of the NES, that the toy was featured prominently in much of the advertising media of the system and its game library, even more than any particular game and even with only one robot game. The robot was portrayed as a bridge between the player and the game. The retail floor displays were each topped with a huge R.O.B. head model, and the launch party centered on a colossal robot replica with many small silver-plated robot models. The toy robot is the highlighted accessory within the first and most premium NES consumer product offering, the Deluxe Set boxed bundle of Control Deck, R.O.B., Zapper light gun, Gyromite, and Duck Hunt.

The NES was launched as the Deluxe Set, in the October 1985 test market of New York City, then in further test markets including Los Angeles, Chicago, and San Francisco, and finally nationwide. The NES's design language with R.O.B. and the Zapper, recategorized the retailers' perception of the NES from a video game to a toy. This bypassed the crashed video game stigma and launched it more safely from the toy sections of retail stores next to established hit robot toys like Transformers, Voltron, Go-Bots, Teddy Ruxpin, and Lazer Tag.

Soon in 1985 came the second and final entry in the Robot Series, Stack-Up, packaged separately along with its own physical game pieces. The NES was soon sold much more popularly in the form of only the Control Deck and Super Mario Bros. — without R.O.B. Optionally, Gyromite was repackaged separately, and R.O.B. was repackaged separately for US$49.99. In the following few years, R.O.B. and the two-game Robot Series were quietly discontinued.

== Hardware ==
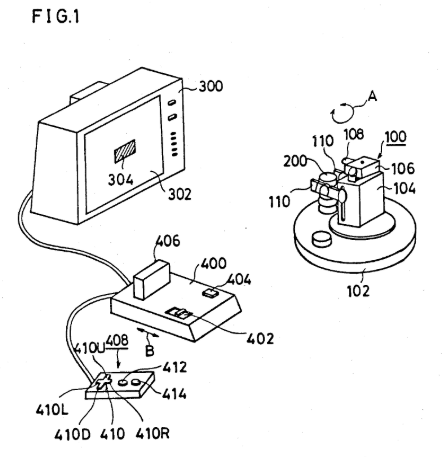
In the patent filing, R.O.B. is placed at the right, facing the CRT screen to receive the game's commands via the screen's optical flashes.

The patent underlying the R.O.B. product was filed by Gunpei Yokoi as "photosensing video game control system", with the same optical electronics as a Zapper, and likewise only functions correctly with a cathode-ray tube (CRT) television and not an LCD. Games can send six distinct commands to R.O.B. by flashing the screen. The test feature within Gyromite and Stack-Up sends an optical flash that should activate R.O.B.'s red light.

== Games ==
Only two officially licensed games were published for R.O.B., which comprise Nintendo's Robot Series: Gyromite and Stack-Up. Computer Entertainer reported Nintendo's supposed plans as stated prior to CES June 1985, for four more nondescript Robot Series games, but they were never released.

=== Gyromite ===
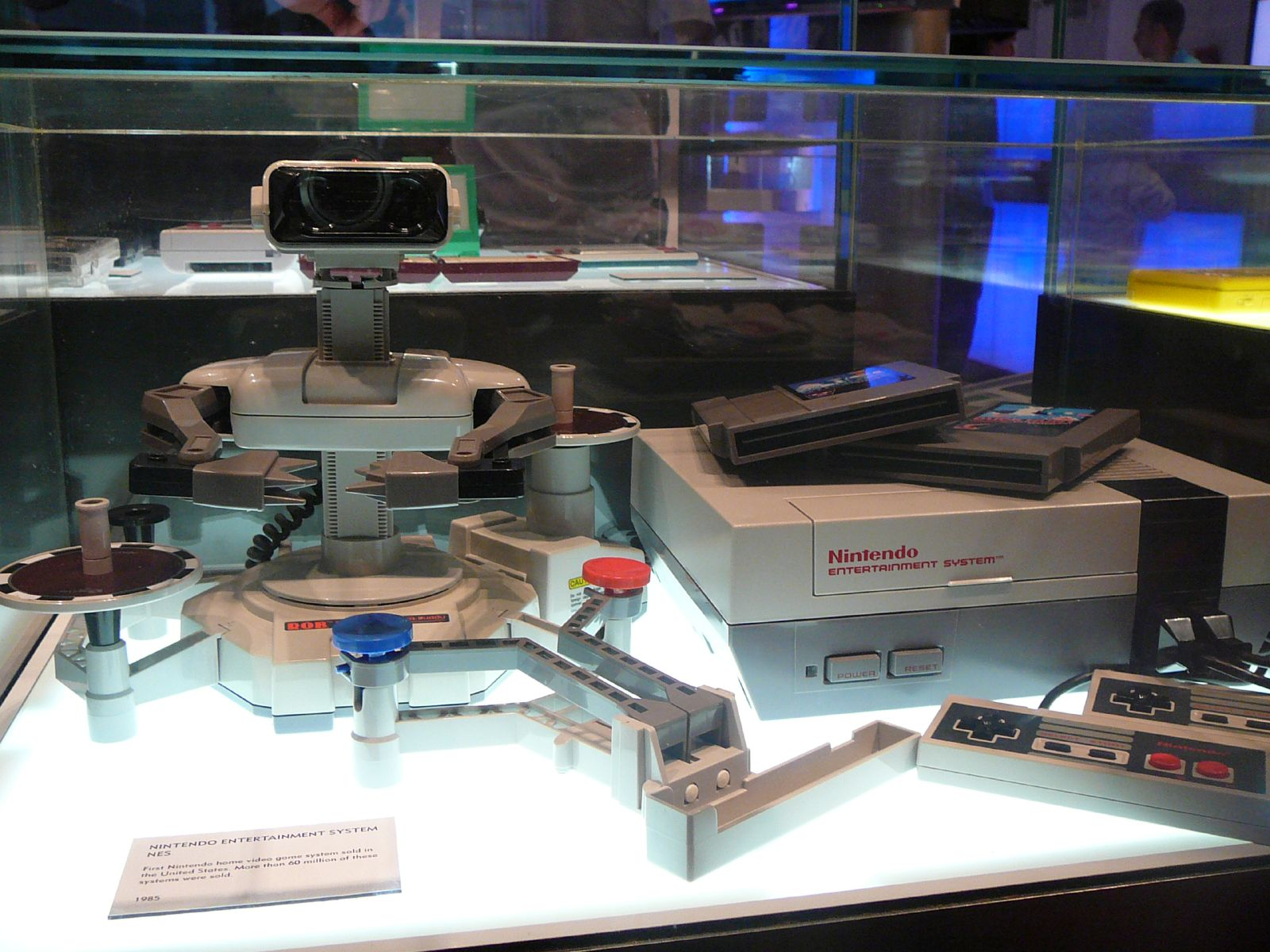
R.O.B. is part of the NES display at Nintendo New York, ready to play Gyromite with his gyro attachment on his right side and the gyro spinner device at his left side.

The Gyromite retail package consists of the following items: two claws for R.O.B.'s hands; two heavy spinning tops called gyros; two red and blue trays upon which the gyros will rest, causing buttons to be pressed on the second NES controller; one spinner motor for accelerating the gyros; and two black trays upon which the gyros are stored when not in use. The Direct game mode is a feature used to learn how to use R.O.B. or to play with R.O.B. without playing the game. Gyromite is a puzzle platform video game in which main character Professor Hector must collect dynamite before the time runs out, with his path blocked by several red and blue pillars and by dinosaur-like creatures called Smicks. Hector cannot jump, so he can only collect dynamite by descending upon it. He can collect radishes that attract the Smicks when dropped. In Game A, the commands are made by pressing START and then pushing the direction in which to move R.O.B., and using the A and B buttons to open and close his arms. If R.O.B. places a gyro on the red or blue button, it pushes the A or B button on the second NES controller, moving the pillar of the corresponding color. If both buttons need to be pressed at the same time, the gyros are placed in a spinner so that they will stay balanced on the button without R.O.B. holding it. Game B has the same controls, except that START does not need to be pressed to make R.O.B. accept a command.

=== Stack-Up ===
Stack-Up comes with five trays, five different colored circular blocks, and two claws worn by R.O.B. for grabbing the blocks. Again, the player controls Professor Hector. In the Direct game mode, the player makes the block stack match with the one shown on screen by moving Hector to the button that corresponds to the desired movement. In Memory, the player makes a list of commands to recreate the displayed block setup, and then R.O.B. executes the list. In Bingo, the player makes the shown block stack, where the color of the block does not matter. There are two enemies: one causes the player to lose a life, and the other makes R.O.B. perform undesired actions.

=== Aftermarket ===
In 2014, independent game developer Retrozone produced a limited release NES cartridge titled 8-Bit X-Mas 2014. The title screen features R.O.B. character graphics, and interacts with the toy by making it dance to Christmas music.

== Reception ==
In January 1986, an independent research firm commissioned by Nintendo delivered a survey of 200 NES owners, showing that the most popular given reason for buying an NES was because children wanted the robot—followed by good graphics, variety of games, and the uniqueness and newness of the NES package. The creation and marketing of R.O.B. as a "Trojan Horse" after the video game crash of 1983 was placed fifth in GameSpy's twenty-five smartest moves in gaming history. Yahoo! ranked R.O.B. as one of the craziest video game controllers and lamented that the peripheral only worked with two games.

By 1987, the two-year-old R.O.B. and Robot Series had received none of Nintendo's promised updates while the rest of the NES's library had exploded with classic flagship franchise-building hits like Super Mario Bros., The Legend of Zelda, and Metroid. In 1987, Mark Seeley of Crash! magazine visited a toy fair in England to observe a playthrough of Gyromite with R.O.B., saying of the struggling demonstrator that he had "never seen anything so complicated and difficult in all my life". In July 1987, Family Computing magazine advocated buying the much cheaper and more entertaining setup of the Control Deck and Super Mario Bros. instead of R.O.B., saying, "Anyone who has seen a Nintendo ad on television would think that R.O.B. is the heart of the system. Not so. R.O.B. is an ingenious idea [but] while R.O.B. is a cute little guy, there isn't much you can do with him. ... [N]either [of his two games] generates much excitement."

In 2018, Owen S. Good of Polygon remembered his childhood experience with the vintage R.O.B. and assessed the setup as "a novel, if almost Rube Goldberg-esque way of 'playing' with its users ... that quickly got dull".

Historian Chris Kohler was unimpressed with the product's long-term entertainment value. "As video game controller peripherals go, R.O.B. was a particularly gimmicky one. Once the novelty of controlling a robot's arms and spinning a glorified top had worn off, usually within days or even hours, R.O.B. got in the way of enjoyment. He required battery replacements too often, and it was immediately apparent that the maze barriers in Gyromite could be turned on and off just as easily by tapping the A and B buttons on a standard controller, which was all that R.O.B.'s complicated motions ended up doing."

In retrospect, Kohler considered R.O.B.'s discontinuation to have become immaterial because the product's whole existence has ultimately amounted to "merely a Trojan Horse to get NES systems into American homes". He said "The gambit worked like a charm, and nobody missed R.O.B. or the Zapper once players realized that games played with the standard video game controller, like Super Mario Bros., were much more fun."

=== Legacy ===
After many failures, the late addition of R.O.B. gave a key product distinction to the launch of the Nintendo Entertainment System, reclassified the platform as a toy, and served as a Trojan Horse to enable the platform's successful launch. This, in turn, secured the survival of Nintendo of America and revitalized the entire video game industry. A followup promotional poster from Nintendo simply pictured R.O.B. and said, "They said reviving the video game market wasn't humanly possible. It wasn't."

R.O.B. has made cameo appearances in many video games, such as StarTropics (1990) for NES, F-Zero GX (2003), the WarioWare series, The Legend of Zelda: Majora's Mask (2015, 3DS), the Star Fox series, and Mario Kart World.

R.O.B. is an unlockable character in Mario Kart DS, Super Smash Bros. Brawl, Super Smash Bros. for Nintendo 3DS and Wii U, and Super Smash Bros. Ultimate, each of which refers to R.O.B. as male. In Brawl's adventure mode, The Subspace Emissary, R.O.B. plays a major role in the plot. As part of Super Smash Bros. for Nintendo 3DS and Wii U, R.O.B. has two Amiibo figurines, uniquely produced in both the gray and white NES color scheme and the red and white Famicom color scheme.

R.O.B. is the avatar for TASBot, a tool-assisted speedrun software bot for video games.

R.O.B. appears in The Super Mario Galaxy Movie and is voiced by Ed Skudder. In the film, R.O.B. is a slow moving service assistant (to mimic the real toy) in the Gateway Galaxy, directing both Peach and later Mario to the flight deck. He also was featured in the film's promotional website. He sports his Famicom color scheme.

== See also ==
- HERO, a programmable robot series for home computers from 1982 to 1995
- Topo, a programmable robot series for home computers from 1983 to 1984
