= LaserScope =

NES light gun peripheral

- Konami LaserScope
- Developer: Konami
- Type: Video game console peripheral
- Generation: Third generation
- Released: 1990
- Introductory price: $39.95
- Media: Input device

The Konami LaserScope is a head-mounted light gun used with and licensed for the Nintendo Entertainment System. Intended to evoke pilots' headgear and provide an immersive experience, the LaserScope received mediocre reviews on release and is now considered an example of the glut of low-quality peripherals for the NES.

== Design ==
The LaserScope was originally designed for the game Laser Invasion and also works with any game compatible with the NES Zapper. In addition, players could detach the LaserScope's "scope module" and use the headphones with any stereo system.

By speaking into an attached microphone, players can "fire" the device from a scope that hangs in front of the player's right eye. A transparent eyepiece with a crosshair aids aiming. The LaserScope also features switches that allow players to channel game audio through attached earpieces.

== Reception ==
Early reviews for the LaserScope were unenthusiastic and highlighted multiple design flaws. Reviewers noted that the microphone required players to "shout fairly loudly" to be registered and was activated by any loud noise (not only "Fire!" as instructions stated). This loud shouting was considered awkward, especially if the player was using the device as headphones in an otherwise quiet room. Because players aimed by pointing their head, the device was also seen as physically tiring compared to the handheld Zapper.

"There's that tier of NES peripherals that are these weird, optional things, like the LaserScope [...] You're just playing the same video games with flimsier, fudgier controls."

— Jeff Gerstmann

Despite these problems, the LaserScope functioned as intended. According to one reviewer, it was "a little gimmicky, but it works."

The LaserScope has appeared on lists of odd, obscure, or "worst" video game devices and has been remembered as uncomfortable and poorly designed. A GameSpy retrospective claimed it was among the "silliest" peripherals released for the NES, and James Rolfe made light of the LaserScope in an episode of The Angry Video Game Nerd by using swear words to fire the device.
