= Metropolitan Police Specialist Training Centre =

Police training centre in Gravesend, Kent, England

Coordinates: 51.44163°N 0.40413°E

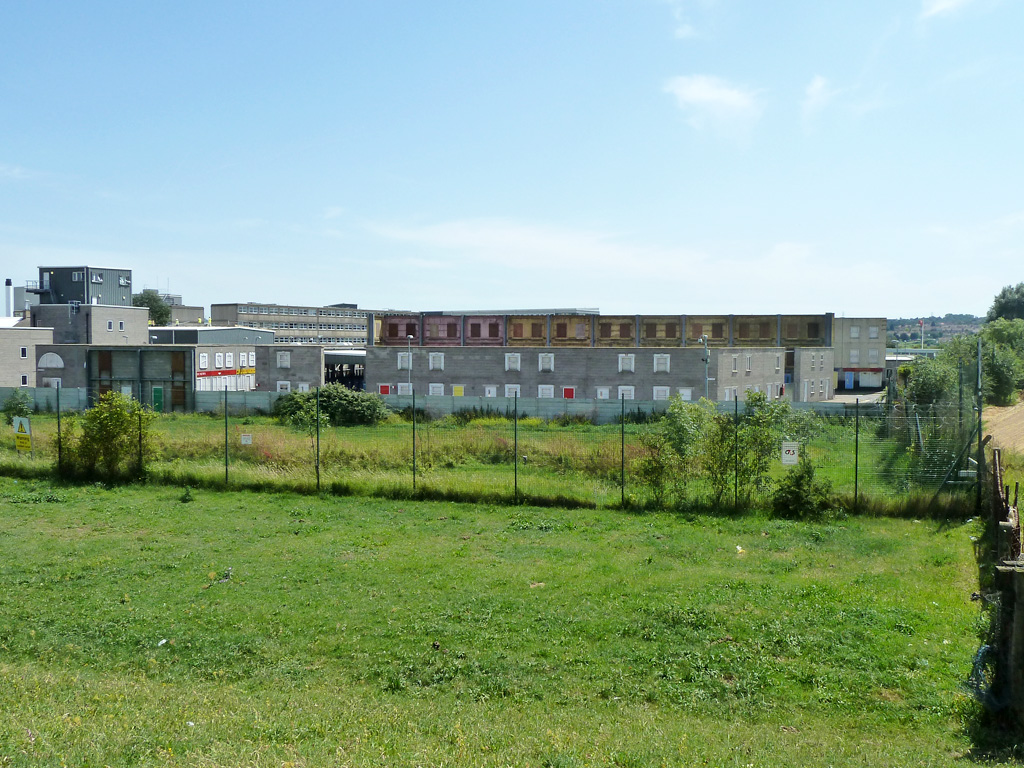
The Specialist Training Centre as viewed from the bank of the River Thames in June 2011

The Metropolitan Police Specialist Training Centre is a specialist training centre for the Metropolitan Police (MPS) in Gravesend, Kent. It provides both Public Disorder and Specialist Firearms training to officers drawn from the MPS, British Transport Police and City of London Police.

The centre was purpose-built for the Metropolitan Police and opened in 2003.

== The site ==
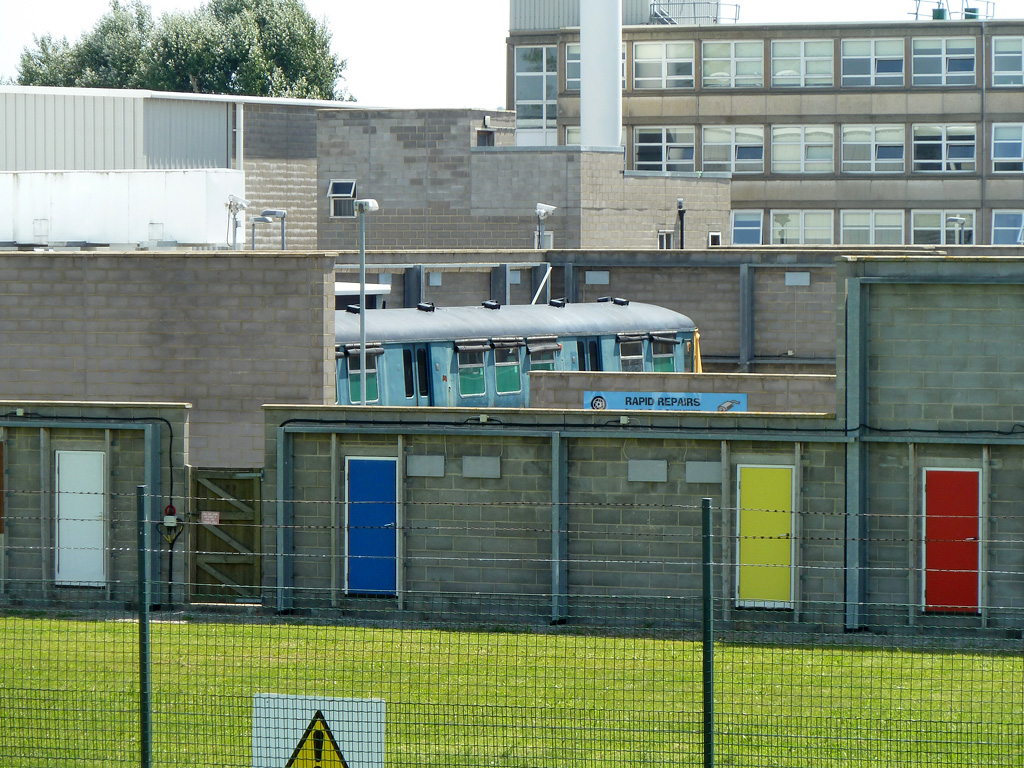
Train carriage forming part of the Specialist Training Centre in July 2011

The site covers 9,250 square metres and was rebuilt by Equion. It was a former military firing range and also the National Civilian Seacraft training centre before the centre relocated to the local college campus.

It features mock roads, shops, a pub, a bank, a nightclub, a football stadium, train and underground stations with full-size carriages and a full-size section of an aircraft. There are also classrooms and lecture theatres, accommodation for more than 300 people, stables for 10 police horses and an abseil tower.

== In media ==
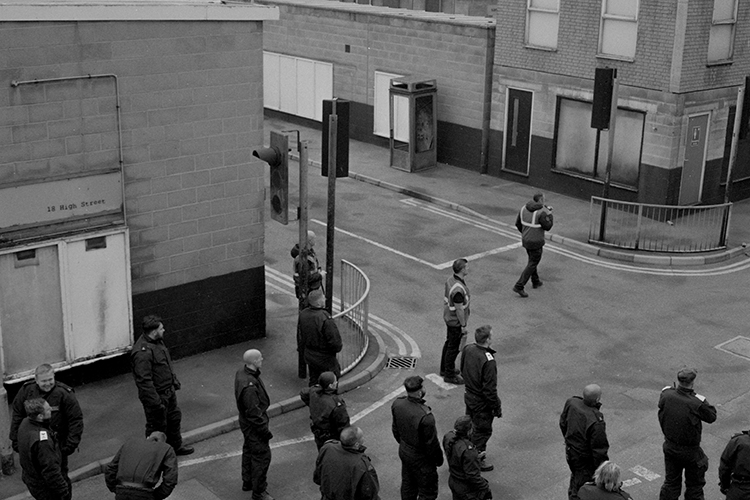
A high-vantage point view shows Officers engaged in public order training at the MPSTC in November 2025.

The site was photographed by James Rawlings in 2014 when he was given access to the site. It took several months of negotiations with authorities for Rawlings to get permission to photograph the site and restrictions included not showing the faces of officers who took part in training.

The 2008 British drama film Incendiary used the Metropolitan Police training facilities near Gravesend as a key filming location. The training ground was used to film scenes set under the football stadium after the bomb attack, including the aftermath of the explosion. The facility in Gravesend was useful because it featured a mock town, a train station, and even an underground train, which provided realistic backdrops for the post-bomb sequence.

The site has also appeared on Television in the former police procedural drama "The Bill".

The site was featured in a video documentary by The Sun published on 13 January 2024 titled "Inside MET police firearms centre where London cops train for raids, shootings and terror attacks". It was published on YouTube.
