= Freedom Force (1988 video game) =

1988 video game

- NES cover art
- Developer: Sunsoft
- Publishers: Sunsoft; Nintendo (arcade)
- Producers: Kiharu Yoshida; Joe Robbins
- Designers: Richard Robbins; Michael Mendheim
- Programmers: Hiroaki Higashiya; Tomomi Sakai
- Artists: Yasuyuki Osada; Katsunori Kobayashi; Rieko Sakai
- Composer: Naoki Kodaka
- Platforms: Nintendo Entertainment System; Arcade
- Release: NES: NA: April 1, 1988>; Arcade: NA: March 1988
- Genres: Light gun shooter, action
- Modes: Single-player, multiplayer (arcade)
- Arcade system: Nintendo VS. System

Freedom Force (Note: フリーダムフォース) is a video game developed and published by Sunsoft for the Nintendo Entertainment System in 1988. The player takes the role of a sharpshooter in a counter-terrorist organization. This is one of the few games to require the NES Zapper light gun accessory.

== Plot ==
Players assume the role of either Rad Rex or Manic Jackson, agents of an anti-terrorist unit known as the Guerrilla Terminator Squad (GTS). The GTS is deployed to take on a terrorist group known as the Unknown Guerrillas, led by Eugene Extreme.

== Gameplay ==
Gameplay screenshot of Freedom Force. Here, a terrorist (in green shirt) is shot while a civilian (on the left) is standing next to him on a Jet bridge.

Freedom Force can be played with one or two players. The different levels in the game include an airport that has been taken over by the terrorists and a city street. The game has some blood, but it lacks gore; a small red splotch appears on the chest of the hit targets. The game requires the use of the NES Zapper.

The screen scrolls from left to right, with terrorists or hostages popping out of windows and doors. Unlike other shooters, the powerups (being either energy, ammo or weapons) are obtained by shooting the lower-right box when an item appears there.

After every two stages, a bonus game can be played for bonus points. This bonus game is a word game similar to Hangman, in which the player shoots letters to uncover the word. During this game, the player can have 5 misses. If the player gets 5 wrong letters or the timer runs out, the bonus game ends without any earned bonus points. If the word is completely revealed, the player gets a time bonus.

== Development ==
In January 1988, Freedom Force was announced in development as a 1-megabit cartridge at the Winter Consumer Electronics Show.

The game was released in arcades by Nintendo on the Nintendo VS. System as VS. Freedom Force in 1988.

== Reception ==
At Winter CES in 1988, Computer Entertainer said "This one is definitely not for the squeamish, but it should be very popular with those who enjoy the more violent games." In July 1988, it reported that Freedom Force was Sunsoft's "best game yet. And they've made the best use yet of the Zapper light gun by building a game around a theme that's as topical as the evening news: the taking of hostages by terrorists".

NintendoAge called the game the best Zapper title and the "creme de’ la creme" of light gun games.
