= Hogan's Alley (video game) =

1984 video game

- North American NES box art
- Developers: Nintendo R&D1; Intelligent Systems
- Publisher: Nintendo
- Director: Shigeru Miyamoto
- Designer: Shigeru Miyamoto
- Composer: Hirokazu Tanaka
- Platforms: NES, arcade
- Release: NES: JP: June 12, 1984; NA: October 18, 1985; EU: December 15, 1987; Arcade: NA: March 1, 1985; EU: August 1985
- Genre: Light gun shooter
- Mode: Single-player
- Arcade system: Nintendo VS. System, PlayChoice-10

Hogan's Alley (Note: Japanese: ホーガンズアレイ, Hepburn: Hōganzu Arei) is a light gun shooter video game developed and published by Nintendo. It was released for the Family Computer in 1984 and then the arcade Nintendo VS. System and Nintendo Entertainment System in 1985. It was one of the first hit video games to use a light gun as an input device, along with Nintendo's Duck Hunt (1984). The game presents players with cardboard cutouts of gangsters and innocent civilians; the player must shoot only the former. It was a major arcade hit in the United States and Europe.

The game is named after and based on Hogan's Alley, a shooting range for law enforcement training somewhat similar in design to the city block rounds, first constructed at Camp Perry in Port Clinton, Ohio in the 1920s and later redesigned for use at the FBI Academy in Quantico, Virginia in 1954. Three years after the release of Hogan's Alley, a third rendition of the Hogan's Alley range was constructed at the FBI Academy, resembling a small town, that is still used today.

== Gameplay ==
A wall round. The middle target is a gangster who must be shot; the woman and police officer to either side must be left alone.

The game begins with three cardboard cutouts moving into position against a blank wall and turning to face the player. The cutouts display a mixture of gangsters and innocent/friendly people; the player must react quickly and shoot only the gangsters. In later rounds, the backdrop changes from the blank wall to a city block, with some cutouts already exposed as they emerge into view. The player is confronted with five cutouts in each of these latter rounds.

After five rounds apiece in the wall and city block, a bonus round is played. Here, the player has a limited supply of ammunition with which to shoot up to ten tin cans thrown from one side of the screen, trying to bounce them onto ledges at the opposite side for points. Bonus points are awarded for any unused ammunition. After this round, the player returns to the wall rounds and the game continues at an increased speed.

Shooting an innocent person, or failing to shoot a gangster, costs the player one life. Bonus lives can be earned for reaching preset score thresholds. The game ends when all lives are lost.

== Release ==
The game is available on the Nintendo Entertainment System and as a Nintendo VS. System Game Pak, which was installed into VS. System Arcade cabinets.

In the United States, Hogan's Alley was released for the Nintendo Entertainment System in 1985 as one of the original 17 launch titles for the system. There are three modes: "Hogan's Alley A" (the blank wall), "Hogan's Alley B" (the town), and "Trick Shot" (shooting soda cans to bounce them onto ledges). The "Trick Shot" mode is played with ten cans per round and an unlimited ammunition supply. An on-screen "MISS" counter increases by one for every time the player shoots an innocent person, fails to shoot a gangster, or lets a can hit the ground. The game ends once the counter reaches 10 or higher. Hogan's Alley include timer top of screen.

== Ports ==
A modified version of Hogan's Alley using the Wii Remote in place of the NES Zapper was released for the Wii U Virtual Console on January 7, 2016, in North America.

== Reception ==
In North America, the arcade version of Hogan's Alley became popular and popularized light gun video games along with Duck Hunt in 1985. In the United States, Hogan's Alley had topped the RePlay arcade charts by November 1985 In Europe, it had also become a very popular arcade game by 1986.

Computer and Video Games magazine gave the arcade version a generally positive review, calling it "a pleasant change" from the space shooters popular in arcades at the time, but noted the gameplay is similar to Sega's Bank Panic which released the same year and that it may not appeal to everyone. Mike Roberts and Eric Doyle of Computer Gamer magazine gave the arcade game a positive review, praising the realistic gun controller. Computer Gaming World named Hogan's Alley as 1988's Best Target Game for the Nintendo Entertainment System, calling it "an entertaining variation on the theme".

== Legacy ==
Digital artist Cory Arcangel hacked the Hogan's Alley game to produce "I Shot Andy Warhol", an art piece that replaces the game's targets with images of Andy Warhol. This is a reference to the film of the same name that dramatized Valerie Solanas's attempted assassination of the artist.

Hogan's Alley-inspired games appear in WarioWare: Touched! and other games in the WarioWare series. In Super Smash Bros. for Nintendo 3DS and Wii U and Ultimate, the Duck Hunt character has the ability to kick the can from the bonus rounds of Hogan's Alley, which can be continually bounced forward by an off-screen shooter using the NES Zapper until it eventually explodes. The character's Final Smash attack causes opponents to get caught in the middle of a shootout between the enemies from Hogan's Alley and Wild Gunman.

== See also ==
- Bank Panic
