= Gumshoe (video game) =

1986 video game

- North American NES box art
- Developer: Nintendo R&D1
- Publisher: Nintendo
- Directors: Yoshio Sakamoto; Satoru Okada
- Producer: Gunpei Yokoi
- Designer: Yoshio Sakamoto
- Programmer: Toru Narihiro
- Composer: Hirokazu Tanaka
- Platforms: NES, arcade
- Release: Arcade: NA: May 1986; NES: NA: August 1986; EU: May 1988
- Genres: Platform, light gun shooter
- Mode: Single-player
- Arcade system: Nintendo VS. System

Gumshoe is a light gun shooter video game developed and published by Nintendo for the VS. System arcade hardware and the Nintendo Entertainment System console. It was released in 1986 in North America and in 1988 in Europe. It was not released in Japan, which is unusual for a Nintendo game. It was designed by Yoshio Sakamoto.

== Plot ==
Mr. Stevenson is an ex-FBI agent turned detective. He receives a ransom note from a mafia boss, King Dom, who has kidnapped Stevenson's daughter, Jennifer. Stevenson must collect five "Black Panther diamonds" within 24 hours in order to see his daughter again.

== Gameplay ==
Mr. Stevenson walks automatically to the right, into a world of deadly pits, traps, and enemies. The player makes him jump by shooting him with the Zapper, and shoots enemies as they appear on screen. Shooting anything else subtracts one bullet, and grabbing red balloons adds bullets.

Gumshoe contains four levels, each with a secret bonus area that can be accessed by first attaining at least twenty balloons.

== Release ==
The release date changed several times. It was first scheduled for June 1986, and was later changed to August 1986.

== Reception ==
In a 2015 article for Uproxx, Nathan Birch ranked Gumshoe as the worst of the NES black box releases, criticizing its game mechanics and its "instant-kill pits", while calling it "one of those lousy Zapper games where you have to protect a dumbass character who trudges forward constantly, oblivious to the dangers around them". In 2023, Garrett Martin of Paste ranked Gumshoe fourth on a list of the NES's eighteen Zapper games. Martin called Gumshoe the "weirdest" and "most fascinating" game on the list but also the most difficult because "it's so hard that most will probably lose interest before finishing the first stage."

In 2013, Simon Parkin of IGN included Gumshoe on a list of the ten "best, most important, most interesting or most unusual lesser-known" games by famous developers. Parkin noted that Gumshoe represented Yoshio Sakamoto's interest in exploring "murky, foreboding scenarios" that contrasted with other Nintendo games. Calling it "one of the most curious genre mash-ups of the era", he wrote that the game's combination of the Zapper with platforming gameplay "demonstrates Sakamoto's restless creativity" and considered the game "an early precursor to the so-called Endless Runner that has found huge popularity on iOS in recent years".
