= Cricket dolls =

Toy line

Cricket is a talking doll that was first unveiled in February 1986 at the American International Toy Fair in New York. It was the first major product sold by Playmates Toys, a Hong Kong–based company that until that time had mostly imported toys from overseas and distributed them for the U.S. market.

Cricket was designed by Larry Jones at California R&D Center. Similar talking animal toys such as Worlds of Wonder's Teddy Ruxpin and The Talking Mother Goose had previously been released but Playmates' concept was to create a humanistic doll that simulated speech capability. The scripts and songs were written by Robin Frederick and Jay Tverdak. Cricket's catchphrases, including "Are we having fun or what?" and "I'll be talkin' to ya!" were written by Jones. Cricket was voiced by nine-year-old Laura Mooney.

The Cricket dolls operated in similar fashion to that of Teddy Ruxpin, but had two-sided cassette tapes with sound and movement data on separate tracks rather than on separate sides of the tape. The doll required four "C" batteries for the player and one nine-volt battery for the mouth movement. As Cricket's mouth moved, her eyes also looked around in different directions.

Cricket was available in models with black and white skin colors. The black Cricket doll was released with two different hairstyles, one with hair identical to that of the white version with two curly pigtails tied with pink yarn and the other with short curly hair and no ribbons.

Cricket was sold wearing a pink sweater, yellow underpants, a pleated mint green skirt, yellow socks and pink high-top sneakers with monogrammed laces. Her sweater came in two variations, one knitted and the other velour and had a small logo of a cricket on the right side of both sweaters. Cricket also came with her "health plan" and two tapes, one labeled "Operating & Caring for Cricket" and the other, which was unlabeled, featured songs, jokes and stories.

The Cricket line was discontinued before all of the planned products could be released. These included the book and tape set “Cricket Visits Australia” and a planned device named the “Chatterbox” which would enable Cricket and Corky to interact in much the same manner as the Grubby accessory for Teddy Ruxpin. Despite this, the products continued to be included in lists and advertised in pamphlets packaged with the doll.

== Book and tape sets ==
Cricket Books were all hardcover and featured interesting facts and instructions for various crafts and activities.

- Cricket Takes a Vacation
- Cricket's Clubhouse
- Growing Up with Cricket
- Cricket Goes Camping
- Around the World with Cricket
- Holiday Fun with Cricket
- Cricket Goes to the Circus
- Cricket Visits Australia (unreleased)
- Cricket's Special Surprise
- Cricket Visits the Zoo
- Cricket Visits China (unreleased)
- Cricket Visits Spain

== Outfit and tape sets ==
These sets included a tape with games, jokes and stories and a coordinated outfit with accessories.

- Indoor Play Time
- School Time
- Time for Health and Exercise
- Time for Outdoor Fun
- Party Time
- Sleepy Time
- Cricket Goes to a Wedding
- Cricket Goes to the County Fair
- Cricket Tours the Hospital

== Other accessories ==
- Cricket's Kitty Shadow (Included tape and grey plush cat)
- Cooking with Cricket (Included tape, plastic utensils and recipe book)
- Cricket's Favorite Games (Included tape and board game)
- Cricket and Corky’s Chatterbox with “Let’s Play Together” tape (unreleased)
- Cricket's Sneakers (Available in blue, red, purple or yellow)
- Cricket's Very Own Chair
- Cricket's Slumber Party Sack

== Corky ==
Cricket had a younger brother named Corky, which was released in 1987 and voiced by nine-year-old Edan Gross. Corky was available in both black and white-skinned models. Tapes that were produced for Corky either came with an appropriate outfit or a workbook which included activities related to math or reading.

- Let’s Play Outdoors (Included workbook)
- Let’s Play at My House (Included workbook)
- Let’s Play at School (Included workbook)
- Corky’s Big Game (Included baseball outfit)
- Corky’s Adventure Scouts (Included scout uniform)
- Corky’s Star Ship (Included astronaut outfit)
- Corky's Very Own Chair
- Corky's Sleep Sack 'N Pack

== Jill ==
Cricket also had an older sister named Jill (voice actress currently unknown), released in 1987. Jill's catchphrase was "I'm a lot like you." Jill operated in much the same way as Cricket and Corky, as she could move her mouth and her eyes left and right. However, Jill could also move her arms, head, and blink as well. She used specially made cartridges containing a four-track tape with three audio tracks and one data track that controlled her movements. Jill also had voice-recognition capabilities. She could ask questions at certain parts of the tape, which could be responded to by either saying "yes" or "no" or choosing one of three answers, to which Jill would then play the correct audio track until the segment was over. If no voice was heard, Jill would choose a reply at random.

Jill was available in both black and white-skinned models, each with the same hairstyle with curly bangs and a curly ponytail tied in a bow with one pink and one blue ribbon. Jill was sold wearing a pink, purple and blue striped sweater, blue leggings, pink socks and pink saddle shoes with a purple toe and blue heel. Her sweater also had her butterfly logo embroidered in blue on her left side.

In 1989, an inanimate version of Jill with no speech capability was produced under the Precious Playmates line. This version only had a white-skinned model which came in both blonde and brunette hair variants. Extra cartridges could be bought separately in sets; the sets included a cartridge, an outfit and various related accessories. The inanimate version was sold with various outfits of Jill's but did not include cartridges or accessories and only came with her default shoes, no matter which outfit was included.

The following outfit/tape packs were produced:

- Jill Babysits
- Jill's First Job
- Jill's Cheerleading Tryouts
- Jill's Starring Role
- Jill's Slumber Party
- Jill Goes to the Mall

== Other merchandise ==
In addition to the collection of Cricket books, outfits and tapes, Playmates produced coloring books, paper dolls, and home videos.

In 1987, two direct-to-video specials were produced by Canadian animation studio Nelvana and released by Hi-Tops Video on videocassette using audio from pre-existing audiocassettes, including “Cricket's Clubhouse” and “Around the World with Cricket.” This videocassette was also released in the United Kingdom by Channel 5 Video (a division of Polygram Video).

Also in 1987, five coloring books were published by Happy House (a subsidiary of Random House), and illustrated by Pam Posey and Kathy Allert, including “Cricket’s Clubhouse”, “Cricket’s First Day of School”, “Cricket’s Round the World Tour”, “Cricket’s Busy Day” and “Cricket’s Trace 'n' Rub”. In 1988, Random House published the illustrated story book “Cricket and the Birthday Ring”, written by Emily James.
