= Worlds of Wonder (toy company) =

1980s American toy company

- Industry: Consumer electronics, video games
- Founded: 1985; 41 years ago
- Defunct: 1991; 35 years ago
- Fate: Closed, properties liquidated
- Headquarters: Fremont, California, U.S.
- Key people: Don Kingsborough
- Products: Teddy Ruxpin, Lazer Tag, Nintendo Entertainment System (distribution)
- Revenue: $320 million sales in 1986

Promotional photo of Don Kingsborough playing Lazer Tag

Worlds of Wonder (WoW) was an American toy company founded in 1985 by former Atari sales president Don Kingsborough, and former Atari employee Mark Robert Goldberg. Its founding was inspired by a prototype that became its launch product, Teddy Ruxpin. In 1986, it launched Lazer Tag and filed an IPO which Fortune magazine called "one of the year's most sought after stock sales". WoW partnered with the young Nintendo of America as retail sales distributor, crucial to the landmark launch and rise of the Nintendo Entertainment System from 1986 to 1987.

Still in the wake of the disastrous video game crash of 1983, WoW leveraged the market power of its own hit toys pressure the retailers to buy the NES. The breakthrough success of the NES resurrected the failed American video game market. Nintendo capped WoW's windfall sales commissions for the NES at $1 million per year per sales staff. In 1987, WoW's success had diminished due to several factors, including its miscalculation of its products' obsolescence in the toy industry's boom–bust cycle. In October, Nintendo canceled the partnership and hired away WoW's sales staff.

Worlds of Wonder was closed in 1991. Across the decades, other companies have given major technology refreshes to new generations of Teddy Ruxpin and Lazer Tag.

== History ==
=== Background ===
The video game crash of 1983 was an industrywide disaster, especially for Atari. Nintendo's new regional subsidiary, Nintendo of America, was tentatively planning the risky American adaptation of the hit Japanese video game console, the Famicom. The young company had no retail distribution channel and conducted extensive negotiations for a distribution partnership with Atari, including with president of marketing and sales and former sales entrepreneur, Don Kingsborough. The contract process failed in an advanced stage, and Kingsborough and several of his sales staff quit the failing Atari in 1984 to start a new toy company, Worlds of Wonder, in 1985. Nintendo spent 1984 and 1985 retooling the Famicom to the American market, which staunchly rejected all video games. In October 1985, using its own internal street team for door-to-door distribution, Nintendo began the limited test launch of the Nintendo Entertainment System only in New York City, with extreme resistance from retailers, even when offering them an unprecedented money-back guarantee.

=== 1985: founding and Teddy Ruxpin ===
Don Kingsborough had been inspired to start a company when Ken Forsse's company, Alchemy II, solicited him to promote an electronic talking teddy bear invented by its animatronics design team who had worked on The Hall of Presidents at Walt Disney World. He said, "The minute I saw it I knew it was going to be successful". He named the company Worlds of Wonder because he thought it would be fun to see the letters "WOW" on Wall Street. By 1985, five more former Atari executives joined him as founders, and Steve Race joined as executive vice president of marketing. The infamously "so damned likable" Kingsborough recruited one staff member at a crowded restaurant by singing along with a Teddy Ruxpin demonstration while amused patrons gathered around the table. The prototype had a gaunt body figure and cost an unacceptable US$150 (equivalent to about $449 in 2025) until former Atari designer Larry Lynch redesigned it to a still premium $70 price. Seeking breakthrough with retailers, the team made 40 corporate presentations in eight weeks. One executive remembered Kingsborough's charismatic perseverance while avoiding Atari's mistakes, referring to him by his industry nickname: "DK was the glue ... He created a bond. Everybody was working days, nights, weekends. Their whole life was committed to this project."

I'm the guy who dreams and leads people down the road and everything else. Angelo is the guy who, when I say, "Go kill them", goes and kills them. ... Having a lot of toys is not what Worlds of Wonder is about. What children gain from our toys is social value. Lazer Tag teaches them to play with each other, and Teddy Ruxpin teaches bravery and friendship.

— Don Kingsborough

In 1985, the flagship product Teddy Ruxpin became a hit seller, and WoW developed a strong national retail distribution channel of its unique high-tech premium toys. Kingsborough forecast far more than $70 million in sales for the year, expecting to become "the third or fourth largest toy company in the business" by 1986. He speculated that Silicon Valley could become known as "Toy Valley", while WoW's toys competed with the animatronics from Atari founder Nolan Bushnell, such as Chuck E. Cheese, Petsters, and AG Bear. WoW had 100 employees.

=== 1986: Lazer Tag and NES ===
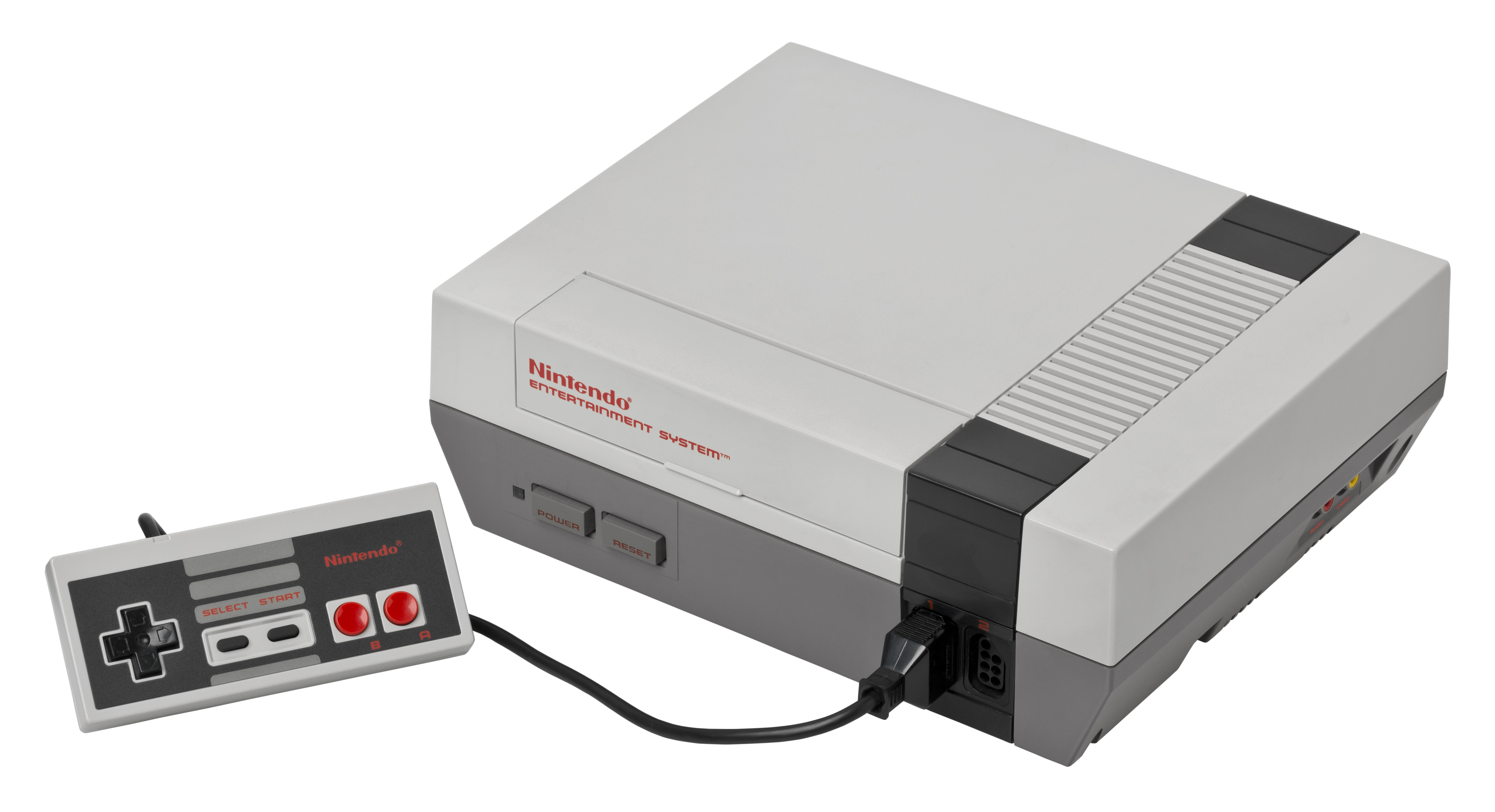
Nintendo Entertainment System

In 1986, WoW launched Lazer Tag and the animated TV series Lazer Tag Academy at about the same time as the home version of Entertech's Photon brand and its Photon show.

In 1986, Nintendo succeeded its own door-to-door street team of improvisational test marketing of the NES by contracting WoW for exclusive nationwide retail sales and distribution, serving as a key advantage in the historical landmark debut of the Nintendo Entertainment System. The NES was an immediate hit in its launch period from late 1985 through early 1986, with WoW sales staff on commission for millions of units per year through 1986 and 1987.

The undeniable strength of WoW's hit products provided Nintendo's breakthrough past retailers' absolute stigma against video games, still severely lingering from the video game crash of 1983. To retailers who were bitterly adamant against hearing the words "video game", WoW salesman Jim Whims distinctly recalled delivering an ultimatum: "if you want to sell Teddy Ruxpin and you want to sell Lazer Tag, you're gonna sell Nintendo as well. And if you feel that strongly about it, then you ought to just resign the line now." Historian Steven Kent wrote, "Anyone who wanted to sell Teddy Ruxpin and Lazer Tag, including Sears and Toys R Us, was going to hear about the Nintendo Entertainment System."

WoW was highly successful for each of its first two years. In 1986, it filed IPO in what Fortune magazine called "one of the year's most sought after stock sales". WoW reported revenue of $23 million on sales of $320 million for fiscal year 1986. WoW had $800 million in back orders for the Christmas season, mainly for Teddy Ruxpin and Lazer Tag, and Teddy Ruxpin sales peaked that year.

=== 1987-1990: peak and bankruptcy ===
In March 1987, Fortune called Don Kingsborough "top gun in the toy business" with a 22% stake in Worlds of Wonder worth $100 million. He promised to break out of the predictable boom-bust pattern of the hit-driven toy industry, in which each toy becomes quickly obsolete with excess inventory. With the approach of the 1987 Christmas season, sales of the NES as distributed by WoW were exploding, becoming the top product for WoW's distribution even ahead of its own products. This yielded windfall commissions for WoW sales staff such as Mike Needleman and Richard Tuckley, so Nintendo capped them each at $1 million per year. Executive Steve Race recalled, "It was an easy deal. You just said [to retailers], 'Here's your lucky day. I've got an extra 50,000 pieces of NES.' Easy sell." Conversely, management staff of Worlds of Wonder grossly overestimated the popularity and inventory requirements of Teddy Ruxpin, which was actually in declining demand and was dwarfed by the NES, yielding a huge financial shortfall. In October 1987, Nintendo of America president Minoru Arakawa discontinued the sales distribution contract with WoW in favor of Nintendo's growing clout. Don Kingsborough was about to lay off his sales staff, and Arakawa hired them directly—the same sales staff previously offered to Nintendo by Atari in 1983.

Company officers of Worlds of Wonder made some stock trades that spooked investors. The company received much negative press after a sheriff's deputy shot and killed a suspect, mistaking the suspect's Lazer Tag toy for a real gun. In response to devaluation, WoW issued Non-Investment Grade Bonds, commonly known as junk bonds, in an effort to buoy its stock. Although there is some contention as to whether this strategy would have helped, the attempt was made moot by the 1987 stock market crash. In 1988, WoW filed for bankruptcy protection, was liquidated, sold operating control to investor Eli Jacobs, and executed a series of layoffs. The creditors continued to operate the company in receivership, only selling off existing inventory without developing or manufacturing new toys, until finally closing in late 1990.

=== Enduring products ===
Later versions of Teddy Ruxpin were released by Playskool, and Yes! Entertainment (also formed by Don Kingsborough), Backpack Toys, and then Wicked Cool Toys.

The Lazer Tag brand was continued by Shoot The Moon Products, a toy invention company formed by two other Worlds of Wonder founders David Small and Paul Rago, and new Lazer Tag equipment has been produced under license by Tiger Electronics and Hasbro. The new Lazer Tag toys are not compatible with the original Worlds of Wonder Lazer Tag gear except via a hidden interface in some of the Hasbro gear.

== Legacy ==
Worlds of Wonder was the crucial retail sales distribution partner to Nintendo of America from 1986 to 1987. Still in the wake of the disastrous video game crash of 1983, WoW sales staff leveraged its hit toys Teddy Ruxpin and Lazer Tag in ultimatums to coerce retailers to buy the Nintendo Entertainment System. This aggressive retail injection propelled the NES to smash hit status, allowing Nintendo to resurrect the American video game industry in the process. Across the decades, Teddy Ruxpin and Lazer Tag have received technology refreshes and continued at other companies.

== Products ==
- Teddy Ruxpin (1985), a story-telling bear
- Grubby, Octopede companion to Teddy and helps him tell stories
- Lazer Tag (1986), an early version of Laser Tag
- Pamela: The Living Doll (1986), an interactive talking doll dressed in overalls and comes with 3 additional outfits, add-on program cartridges ("voice cards"), and sticker activity books that had an alien-themed television commercial that played on the popularity of E.T. The Extraterrestrial
- The Talking Mickey Mouse (1986), an animated version of the iconic mouse
- Goofy, helps Mickey tell the stories
- The Talking Mother Goose, an animated animal version of the famed storyteller, who tells fairy tales instead of rhymes, in 1986.
- Hector the ugly duckling helps Mother Goose tell the stories, also voiced by Russi Taylor.
- Action Max (1987), a VCR and light gun game
- Julie (1987), an interactive talking doll
- The Talking Snoopy (1986), an animated speaking version of Charles Schulz's Peanuts character Snoopy that uses cassettes as the others do and voiced by Cam Clarke. A talking Charlie Brown toy was planned, but never produced due to the bankruptcy.

The 13 episodes of the cassette of The World of Snoopy (Worlds of Wonder): Rock-A-Bye Snoopy, Snoopy and the Great Pumpkin, Snoopy at the Dog Show, Snoopy Goes Camping, Snoopy Hits The Beach, Snoopy, Spike and the Cat Next Door, Snoopy's America, Snoopy's Band, Snoopy's Baseball Game, Snoopy's Birthday Party, Snoopy's Land Of Make Believe, Snoopy's Show and Tell, Snoopy's Talent Show

- "Express it": The Locker Answering Machine (1987), a sound-(high-pitch whistle)-activated tape recorder that can be mounted on the inside of a locker; part of the "Class Act" line of school supplies
- Hop, Skip & Jump (1989), a jump rope that doubles as a belt or fashion accessory
- Hide 'N' Sneak (1989), transforms the traditional game of hide and seek into high-tech excitement by allowing a player to locate other players with ultrasonic sound
- Rockin' Boppers (1989), 4 different dolls that "dance" to the beat of music
- Skip Stik (1988), a twist-apart 3-foot bar with foam hand grips attached on each end to an 8-foot
- Splatter Up (1988), a wet version of baseball designed by WET Design and later made by Buddy L and Wham-O
- GT Super Screamers (1990), a slotless race car game using fly-by-wire technology, nicad batteries and Nissan GTP ZX-Turbo race cars
- The Jaminator (1990), an electronic air guitar that plays different riffs by button-press, and provides basic rhythm accompaniment with a small keyboard and drum pads
- Little Boppers (1987) and Monster Boppers (1988) versions of Teddy Ruxpin, Mickey Mouse, and The Muppets that dance when music is played; two Mickeys made by Fisher-Price, "Dance Star Mickey" and "Rock Star Mickey", differ from the Little Boppers Mickey
- Muppet Babies, holding cordless conversations between up to five dolls
- Baby Teddy Ruxpin (1987) an interactive talking baby counterpart of Teddy Ruxpin
- Zoo Tunes (1990), three plush puppet zoo characters, Lion, Hippo, and Alligator that play a series of tunes when sensors in mouth are pressed together; a sensor in the hands changes the tune
- Little Big Rigs, five plush construction toys
- Distribution of the Nintendo Entertainment System in the United States during its first few years

=== Class Act ===
Class Act is a product line of school supplies created by Worlds of Wonder in 1987. The line is high-tech in style though the only piece that is truly high-tech is Express It: The Locker Answering Machine. The line consisted of:

- Sack It, designer print and denim backpacks
- Stuff It, hard-shell 3-ring binder with magnetic closure
- Stack It, plastic stacking locker shelving system
- Express It, locker answering machine

The series includes decorated Trapper Keeper-styled folders and pencils. When Worlds of Wonder declared bankruptcy in 1988, the line was severely hurt by the crisis and ultimately canceled.
