= Splatter Up =

T-ball water toy

Splatter Up is a T-ball toy released in 1988, designed by WET Design, under the Worlds of Wonder brand. The toy was later manufactured (marketed) by Buddy-L and Wham-O. The toy has been described as a "wet version of baseball" using a garden hose attached to a foot pedal to control the water pressure that funnels the water into a stream to push a wiffle ball up into the air so it can be hit with a plastic bat.

In 1989, the Consumer Affairs Committee of Americans for Democratic Action recommended Splatter Up as a "safe and fun toy".
