= Ken Forsse =

American inventor, author and producer (1936–2014)

- Born: Earl Kenneth Forsse; September 17, 1936; Bellwood, Nebraska, US
- Died: March 19, 2014 (aged 77); Laguna Woods, California, US
- Occupation: Inventor
- Known for: Creator of Teddy Ruxpin
- Spouse(s): Wendy Forsse (m. 1964 – her death in 1984); Jan Forsse (m. 1987)

Earl Kenneth Forsse (September 17, 1936 – March 19, 2014) was an American inventor, toymaker, and former Disney Imagineer. He was best known as the creator of the animatronic talking bear Teddy Ruxpin, which became the best-selling toy in the United States in 1985. Earlier in his career, Forsse worked for Walt Disney Productions on the development of several theme park attractions before founding Alchemy II, the company that produced Teddy Ruxpin and related projects, including the animated series The Adventures of Teddy Ruxpin.

== Life and works ==
Ken Forsse was born on September 17, 1936, in Bellwood, Nebraska, before moving to Southern California with his family. He graduated from Burbank High School in 1954.

Forsse began his career in Disney’s mailroom before later joining the animation team, working as an "inbetweener" on Sleeping Beauty (1959) alongside high school friend Ron Cobb and animator George Edwards.

When Cobb and Forsse found themselves laid off upon completion of Sleeping Beauty, they sought the mentorship of Ellis Burman, where they learned how to create movie props. Attempts to break into the industry by creating designs for Roger Corman were unsuccessful, largely due to the cost.

In the late 1950s, science-fiction promoter Forrest J Ackerman sought to mount a film adaptation of J. R. R. Tolkien’s The Lord of the Rings, commissioning a screenplay treatment that Tolkien himself critiqued in a 1958 letter. Forsse and Cobb were involved in Ackerman’s unproduced attempt, contributing during the project’s early development.

In 1958, Forsse worked with Larry Jackson and Jan Mitchell on a children’s television pilot, The Adventures of Sir Gadzooks, written by Budd Bankson. Forsse sculpted the latex puppet characters and built the settings, while Ron Cobb provided the character designs. Although the pilot, and a second project titled The Flying Dutchman, were never sold, Forsse later described the experience as valuable early training in production design. Forsse and Robert S. Anselmo went on to start a business, Artistry in Dimension, selling museum replicas for display and film to minimal success.

In May 1960, Forsse was reported to have completed eight weeks of advanced individual missile training at the Artillery and Missile Center at Fort Sill, Oklahoma, where he trained as a crewman on the Army Corporal surface-to-surface missile.

After completing his military service, Forsse returned to Disney and worked on designing theme park attractions for the next twelve years as an Imagineer, including Great Moments with Mr. Lincoln, Walt Disney's Enchanted Tiki Room, It's a Small World, Jungle Cruise, Country Bear Jamboree, and The Haunted Mansion. In the Haunted Mansion’s graveyard tea-party scene, a tombstone marked “R.I.P. Nekeessorf” can be seen; its reversed spelling (“Frossek en”) has been interpreted by Disney researchers as a tribute to Ken Forsse.

Forsse did contract work for the Santa Cruz Beach Boardwalk, producing pieces for the Cave Train to the Lost World and creating the three seahorses that adorn the roof of the Santa Cruz Looff Carousel.

During the mid-1970s, Forsse worked with television producers Sid and Marty Krofft, where he ran the studio’s model shop and worked within its in-house effects division, the Show Business Factory, contributing mechanical and miniature effects to several of their television projects. He was credited as a consultant on miniatures for The Lost Saucer (1975–1976), and as an effects consultant on Far Out Space Nuts (1975–1976). He also worked on miniature effects for Land of the Lost. He also worked on the Crystal Carousel attraction for The World of Sid and Marty Krofft (1976), a short-lived indoor theme park in Atlanta. The Kroffts later had Forsse design a haunted-house-style attraction for the park; he developed an elaborate scale model over roughly eighteen months, but the project was never built.

Forsse later contributed to projects within the studio’s Show Business Factory division, including Whimsy Works, a themed churro shop featuring animatronic figures that served as his final Krofft project, and Pizza Productions, a stage show with singing animatronic characters built by Forsse. Forsse was also involved in the production of Donn Arden’s Jubilee! at the MGM Grand Hotel, Las Vegas, where a handwritten notation identifying him appears on an MGM prop list preserved in the UNLV Special Collections’ Jubilee! property files. His contributions to Jubilee! were sets for the Samson and Delilah act as well as the Titanic model and mechanism that made it sink.

Forsse purchased a bear-head prop from the Kroffts, which he named Carl, an idea that inspired his later experiments with animatronic costume design and the puppetronic performance systems developed at Alchemy II.

In 1980, Forsse formally established his company Alchemy II, initially operating out of his garage in Burbank, California. By October 1982, he had hired key collaborators Linda Pierson, Larry Larsen, Leon Heflin, and Mary Becker.

Through Alchemy II, Forsse approached Disney to develop the costumes for Welcome to Pooh Corner, one of the first original programs for the newly launched Disney Channel. The series introduced Forsse’s concept of “puppetronics,” a hybrid technique combining animatronics with wearable costuming to portray characters from the ‘‘Winnie-the-Pooh’’ stories. In 1983, Forsse was nominated for a CableACE Award for costume design for Welcome to Pooh Corner. Welcome to Pooh Corner lost to Faerie Tale Theatre in the Innovative and Family Programming category that year; the episode “The Nightingale” featured an animatronic nightingale created by Forsse’s company, Alchemy II.

Another early Alchemy II project involved creating a fully animated version of Mount Vesuvius and a robotic band for the Palm Springs supper club Last Nights of Pompeii.

Forsse and his team then brought Teddy Ruxpin to the marketplace. Teddy Ruxpin became the top selling toy of 1985 and 1986 and was made by Worlds of Wonder.

In 2005, Alchemy II made an agreement with toy manufacturer BackPack Toys to have Teddy Ruxpin back on the shelves yet again and the toy made a return in 2006 before being discontinued again in 2010. In addition, the animated TV series was released for the first time on DVD in 2008.

Forsse died from congestive heart failure on March 19, 2014, aged 77.

== In other media ==
Independent filmmaker Billy Tooma spent four years researching and making Ken Forsse: Come Dream with Me Tonight, a nine-part docuseries on the man behind Teddy Ruxpin. It was produced by Grundo Gazette's Vincent Conroy and debuted on January 3, 2022.

The Toys That Built America’s second season’s seventh episode, “80’s Tech Toys,” covered Forsse’s creation of the Teddy Ruxpin animated talking toy, with British actor, David Brooks, portraying the inventor.

== Works ==
=== Children’s books ===
- The Airship: Discover a Whole New World (1985), Worlds of Wonder, Dana Point, CA, 26 pp., ISBN 9780934323000
- Teddy Ruxpin and the Mudblups: Is Being Neat Hard to Do? (1985), Worlds of Wonder, 26 pp., ISBN 0934323038
- The Wooly What's-It (1985), Worlds of Wonder, 28 pp., ISBN 9780934323055
- The World of Teddy Ruxpin: All About Bears (1985), Worlds of Wonder / Alchemy II, 28 pp., ISBN 9780934323093
- Teddy Ruxpin's Lullabies: Warm and Cuddly Songs to Dream By (1985), Worlds of Wonder, 28 pp., ISBN 0934323011
- Teddy Ruxpin's Birthday (1985), Worlds of Wonder, 26 pp., ISBN 9780934323130
- Teddy's Winter Adventure (1985), Worlds of Wonder / Alchemy II, 26 pp., ISBN 9780934323123
- Tweeg Gets the Tweezles (1987), Alchemy Communications Group, 26 pp., ISBN 9780934323413
- The Missing Princess: You've Got to Take Care of You (1985), Worlds of Wonder, 26 pp., ISBN 0934323119
- Take a Good Look (1985), Worlds of Wonder, ISBN 0934323089
- Grubby’s Romance (1985), Alchemy Communications Group, 26 pp., ISBN 0934323046
- Tweeg and the Bounders (1985), Alchemy Communications Group, 26 pp., ISBN 0934323100
- The Third Crystal (1987), Alchemy Communications Group, ISBN 0934323437
- Grundo Beach Party: Sun and Sand with Friends Can Be Fun (1986), Worlds of Wonder, ISBN 0934323356
- Branson Bear and the Kite Contest (1997), Xploractive Concepts, ISBN 1890315044 — written by Ken Forsse; illustrated by John Moore and James Cassimus.
- Branson Bear and the Honeyberry Pie (1997), Xploractive Concepts, ISBN 1890315052 — written by Ken Forsse; illustrated by James Cassimus.

=== Patents ===
- EP 0195627 A2 – Electromechanical controller (filed Sep 24, 1986) (Note: EP 0195627 A2, Forsse, Earl Kenneth; Larsen, Larry Kenneth; Davies, John Morgan, "Electromechanical controller", published Sep 24, 1986, assigned to Gray Ventures, Inc.)
- EP 0212871 A2 – Method and apparatus for recording and playback of animation control signals (filed Mar 4, 1987) (Note: EP 0212871 A2, Forsse, Earl Kenneth; Davies, John Morgan; Larsen, Larry Kenneth; Thompson Jr., Darwin C., "Method and apparatus for recording and playback of animation control signals", published Mar 4, 1987, assigned to Gray Ventures, Inc.)
- US D291,818 – Talking bear (issued Sep 8, 1987) (Note: US D291818, Forsse, Earl K., "Talking bear", published Sep 8, 1987, assigned to Alchemy II, Inc.)
- US 4,665,640 – Electromechanical controller (issued May 19, 1987) (Note: US 4665640, Forsse, Earl K.; Larsen, Larry K.; Davies, John M., "Electromechanical controller", published May 19, 1987, assigned to Gray Ventures, Inc.)
- US 4,949,327 – Method and apparatus for the recording and playback of animation control signals (issued Aug 14, 1990) (Note: US 4949327, Forsse, Earl K.; Larsen, Larry K.; Davies, John M.; Thompson Jr., Darwin C., "Method and apparatus for the recording and playback of animation control signals", published Aug 14, 1990, assigned to Gray Ventures, Inc.)
- US 5,138,783 — Artwork system utilizing liquid crystal gate shutters for controlling the illumination and transmission of light through transparent panels (issued Aug 18, 1992) (Note: US 5138783, Forsse, Earl K., "Artwork system utilizing liquid crystal gate shutters for controlling the illumination and transmission of light through transparent panels", published Aug 18, 1992)
- US 5,165,689 — Three-dimensional jigsaw puzzle sculpture (issued Nov 24, 1992) (Note: US 5165689, Forsse, Earl K.; Forsse, Janis R., "Three-dimensional jigsaw puzzle sculpture", published Nov 24, 1992)
- US 5,337,125 — Modular book binder with auxiliary communication/entertainment modules (issued Aug 16, 1994) (Note: US 5337125, Forsse, Earl K.; Forsse, Janis R., "Modular book binder with auxiliary communication/entertainment modules", published Aug 16, 1994)
- US 5,791,082 – Universal Christmas tree water delivery system using gravity-regulated flow (issued Sep 15, 1998; with Janis R. Forsse) (Note: US 5791082, Forsse, Earl K.; Forsse, Janis R., "Universal Christmas tree water delivery system using gravity-regulated flow", published Sep 15, 1998)
- US 5,807,176 — Station for providing remote interactivity with a multimedia source (issued Sep 15, 1998; with Janis R. Forsse) (Note: US 5807176, Forsse, Earl K.; Forsse, Janis R., "Station for providing remote interactivity with a multimedia source", published Sep 15, 1998)
- US 6,962,457 — Binder for receiving and retaining papers (issued Nov 8, 2005) (Note: US 6962457, Forsse, Earl K., "Binder for receiving and retaining papers", published Nov 8, 2005, assigned to Xporactive Concepts)
- US 7,210,999 — Interactive binder and platform system (issued May 1, 2007) (Note: US 7210999, Forsse, Earl K., "Interactive binder and platform system", published May 1, 2007)
