= Lazer Tag Academy =

- Genre: Animation
- Developed by: Dan DiStefano
- Directed by: John Kimball; Rudy Larriva
- Voices of: Booker Bradshaw; Pat Fraley; Noelle Harling; Billy Jayne; Christina MacGregor; Tress MacNeille; Sid McCoy; Frank Welker; R. J. Williams
- Narrated by: Don LaFontaine (opening narration)
- Country of origin: United States
- Original language: English
- No. of episodes: 13

Production
- Executive producers: Joe Ruby; Ken Spears
- Running time: 30 minutes
- Production companies: Ruby-Spears Productions; Worlds of Wonder; Saban Productions

Original release
- Network: NBC
- Release: September 13 – December 6, 1986

Lazer Tag Academy is an animated series inspired by Worlds of Wonder's Lazer Tag (their branded version of the pursuit game referred to generically as "laser tag") that was created by Ruby-Spears Productions. Original episodes aired on NBC from September 13 to December 6, 1986 with reruns lasting until August 22, 1987.

It was later shown in reruns under the new title Lazer Patrol on the Sci Fi Channel as part of Sci Fi Cartoon Quest.

Another laser tag related series, DIC Entertainment's live-action Photon series aired the same year in syndication.

The show contains numerous popular culture references, from the Man in the Iron Mask to E.T. the Extra-Terrestrial.

== Synopsis ==
Jamie Jaren, the Lazer Tag Champion of 3010, travels back in time to the year 1987 to help her ancestors, teenagers Tom and Beth and toddler Nicky. Jamie protects the kids from Draxon Drear, a master criminal from the year 2061 who was unwittingly revived from suspended animation by Jamie's teacher Professor Olanga after he ended up in that state following a spaceship hijacking accident. Draxon's spaceship crashed into the Atlantic Ocean and was kept in suspended animation until he was revived. Professor Olanga's analysis reveals that Draxon is a relative of Jamie.

Draxon has traveled back in time to destroy Beth because she would eventually create the Starlyte gun and Starsensor (two real-life Lazer Tag products) worn by Jamie. These machines enabled Jamie to compete in the Lazer Tag tournaments of her time period. In the hands of certain individuals, a Starlyte is capable of producing effects that enable the wielder to manipulate matter and energy on a molecular scale and with the aid of the Starsensor, travel through time.

Draxon leads a group of genetically-enhanced humanoids called Skuggs who were originally created to serve humanity before they ended up in Draxon's thrall. One of the Skuggs accidentally sets off the suspended animation gas on Draxon's spaceship, which reawakens Draxon and the Skuggs several centuries in the future.

Beth and Tom's parents Andrew and Genna Jaren were mostly ignorant to the battles with Draxon Drear and the Skuggs and believed Jamie was a foreign exchange student. In addition, Tom and Beth's schoolmate Charles Ferguson is suspicious of Jamie, and repeatedly tries to learn her secret.

== Episodes ==
No.	Title	Original release date
1	"The Beginning"	September 13, 1986
Jamie Jaren pursues Draxon Drear from 3010 to 1987, and meets her ancestors, Tom, Beth, and Nicky Jaren.
2	"Skugg Duggery"	September 20, 1986
Everyone in town is turned into Skuggs and the Jarens have to change them back.
3	"Yamoto's Curse"	September 27, 1986
The Jarens head to Tokyo where Drear has stolen Dr. Yamato's special plant food.
4	"Pay Dirt"	October 4, 1986
The Jarens capture Drear only to find out he planted a bomb that will trigger a devastating earthquake.
5	"Charles' Science Project"	October 11, 1986
Charles Ferguson steals the Jarens' Starlyte Blocker and claims it as his own.
6	"The Witch Switch"	October 18, 1986
Drear travels back to Salem, Massachusetts in 1690 to make sure Abigail Jaren is condemned for being a witch.
7	"The Olanga Story"	October 25, 1986
Drear and the Skuggs head to 13th Century Africa to prevent a royal marriage so that Professor Olanga is never born.
8	"Battle Hymn of Jaren's"	November 1, 1986
The Jarens go to Gettysburg, Pennsylvania in 1863 to ensure that Bo Jaren marries Sara Beth. But will Drear have his way and prevent the modern Jarens from being born?
9	"Sir Tom of Jaren"	November 8, 1986
Tom, Beth, and Jamie go back in time to Camelot where Drear has decided to steal Excalibur and kidnap Guinevere.
10	"Redbeard's Treasure"	November 15, 1986
Jamie, Tom, and Beth go back to 1748 to get Redbeard's treasure for a sea captain to prevent foreclosure on his boat, not knowing Drear and the Skuggs are there, too. Note: Nicky, Ralphie, Mr. and Mrs. Jaren, and Charles Ferguson do not appear in this episode.
11	"Drear's Doll"	November 22, 1986
The Jarens decide to help a lost child unaware that she's an android programmed by Drear to steal their Starlytes.
12	"StarLyte on the Orient Express"	November 29, 1986
Jamie, Tom, Beth, and Drear all end up on the Orient Express when their Starlytes are stolen by a mysterious thief. Note: The character Agatha Marble is a combo of Agatha Christie and her fictional detective Miss Marple.
13	"Jamie and the Spitfires"	December 6, 1986
The Jarens are called to the year 3010 to deal with Drear and The Spitfires, a futuristic biker gang, led by Jamie's old rival Corbin Tucker. Series finale.

== Cast ==
- Booker Bradshaw - Draxon Drear
- Pat Fraley - Charlie Ferguson, Skuggs
- Noelle Harling - Jamie Jaren
- Billy Jayne - Tom Jaren
- Don LaFontaine - Opening Narration
- Christina MacGregor - Beth Jaren
- Tress MacNeille - Genna Jaren
- Sid McCoy - Professor Olanga
- Frank Welker - Andrew Jaren, Skuggs, Ralphie
- R. J. Williams - Nicky Jaren

=== Additional voices ===
- Susan Blu
- Phillip Clark
- Michael Horton
- Harvey Jason
- Rodney Kageyama
- Maurice LaMarche
- Mel Wells

== Crew ==
- Michael Hack - voice director
- Dan DiStefano - story editor
- Ted Field - assistant story editor
- John Kimball and Rudy Larriva - series directors

== UK VHS release ==
VHS title	Release date	Episodes
Lazer Tag Academy (VC1088)	1987	"The Beginning", "Skugg Duggery"

== Home media and syndication ==
Three VHS tapes were released by Celebrity Home Entertainment:

1. Lazer Tag Academy: The Movie was released in 1989 (95 minutes)
2. Lazer Tag Academy: Champion's Biggest Challenge was released on March 21, 1989 (110 minutes)
3. The third tape was released on June 19, 1991, with a single episode, The Battle Hymn of the Jarens.

Lazer Tag Academy was later rerun in syndication under the name Laser Patrol. This version was also shown briefly on the Sci-Fi Channel.
