= Playmates Toys =

Hong Kong toy company

Playmates Holdings Limited
- Formerly: Playmates Industrial
- Type: Public
- Traded as: SEHK: 869
- Industry: Entertainment
- Founded: 20 June 1966; 60 years ago
- Founder: Sam Chan Tai-ho
- Headquarters: Hong Kong, China
- Key people: To Shu Sing (chairman)
- Products: Dolls, action figures, video games
- Brands: Cricket
- Subsidiaries: Playmates Interactive Entertainment, Inc.
- Website: playmatestoys.com

Playmates Toys Limited is a Hong Kong-based manufacturing company. Playmates was founded in Hong Kong in 1966 by Sam Chan Tai-ho as Playmates Industrial, manufacturing dolls for other companies. In 1975, Playmates began marketing its own line of preschool toys, and in 1977, opened an American subsidiary in Boston, Massachusetts. Another subsidiary was founded in California in 1983; in 1984, the company went public.

The company's first big success was in 1986, marketing a tape-playing, electronic robot doll named Cricket. In 1989, the company marketed Teenage Mutant Ninja Turtles action figures which sold extremely well. The company has also U.S. offices in El Segundo, California.

== Proprietary brands ==
- The Addams Family
- Amazing Dolls
- Amazing Pets
- Austin Powers Vocalizers
- BFF Best Friends Forever
- Cricket
- Hearts For Hearts Girls
- Kinder-Garden Babies
- Kuroba
- Nano Pets
- Ooglies
- R.E.V.s
- Struts
- Tiny Toes
- Waterbabies
- WOW Pals
- Yo Stick

== Tie-in media toys ==
Playmates Toys has often been contracted or granted licensing rights to produce toys, fashion dolls, games, and other merchandise coinciding with popular film and television media. Examples of media that Playmates has produced toys for includes Atomic Betty, Teenage Mutant Ninja Turtles, Star Trek, Ben 10, Godzilla, Frozen, Miraculous Ladybug, Pikwik Pack, Power Rangers (in partnership with Hasbro), and others. These were made in cooperation with various international media production companies, including Canadian company Nelvana and American companies such as Disney, DreamWorks Animation, and Nickelodeon.

== Playmates Interactive Entertainment ==
Playmates Interactive Entertainment, Inc., which made video games, was founded in 1994 as a subsidiary of Playmates Toys Holdings, the parent company of Playmates Toys. With its headquarters in Hong Kong, the United States branch of Playmates Toys was originally located in La Mirada, California. In September 1996, Playmates Toys' US branch and Playmates Interactive Entertainment relocated their headquarters to Costa Mesa, California. At the same time, Gary Rosenfeld and Chris Archer joined the company as vice president of business affairs and producer. In August 1997, Playmates Interactive Entertainment's president, Richard Sallis, resigned and was succeeded by Ron Welch. Playmates Interactive Entertainment stopped publishing games in 1998 and was defunct by May 2000.
