= Lazer Tag =

Toy brand

- Original 1986 logo
- Type: Game
- Invented by: Worlds of Wonder
- Company: Worlds of Wonder (1986–1989); Shoot the Moon Products (1990-1996); Tiger Electronics (1996–1998); Hasbro (1998-present)
- Country: United States
- Availability: 1986–
- Materials: Plastic with electronics

Lazer Tag is a brand name for the pursuit game using infrared toy guns, generically known as "laser tag". It was developed by Worlds of Wonder (WoW) and launched in 1986. As one of America's top hit toys of 1986-1987, Lazer Tag was leveraged by Worlds of Wonder's retail sales network to force the Nintendo Entertainment System into retail stores, which prompted Nintendo of America to lead the nation's recovery from the 1983 video game crash. The Lazer Tag brand is currently a subsidiary of Hasbro's Nerf toy line.

== History ==
What children gain from our toys is social value. Lazer Tag teaches them to play with each other, and Teddy Ruxpin teaches bravery and friendship.

— Worlds of Wonder CEO and founder, Don Kingsborough

Lazer Tag was created by Paul Rago at the toy company, Worlds of Wonder, in 1986, launching that year at approximately the same time as the home version of Entertech's Photon brand. With reported revenue of $23 million on sales of $320 million for fiscal year 1986, WoW had $800 million in back orders for the Christmas season, mainly for Teddy Ruxpin and Lazer Tag.

From 1986 to 1987, the young startup, Nintendo of America, contracted Worlds of Wonder for use of its retail distribution and sales network, in the nationwide launch of the Nintendo Entertainment System. The hit toys of 1986-1987, Lazer Tag and Teddy Ruxpin, were leveraged by Worlds of Wonder sales staff to get the NES video game console into reluctant nationwide retail stores which were still recovering from the disastrous 1983 video game crash. Retailers who balked at hearing the words "video game" received the ultimatum, "if you want to sell Teddy Ruxpin and you want to sell Lazer Tag, you're gonna sell Nintendo as well. And if you feel that strongly about it, then you ought to just resign the line now."

Lazer Tag entered the nationwide controversy over the role of toy guns in violent crime and mistaken shootings by police. On April 7, 1987, 19-year-old Leonard Joseph Falcon was shot and killed in Rancho Cucamonga, California by sheriff's deputy Daniel Durrant after witnesses saw him and several friends playing Lazer Tag, mistaking the toys for real guns.

=== Shoot the Moon ===
Shoot the Moon Products of Pleasanton, California acquired the Lazer Tag brand name after Worlds of Wonder ceased operations in late 1990. The brand name was licensed to Tiger Electronics from 1996 to 1998, and to Hasbro following its acquisition of Tiger.

Tiger released a variety of Lazer Tag-branded products in the mid-1990s, and a series of Star Wars-themed blasters, culminating in a toy collection themed for the 1999 release of Star Wars Episode 1. Tiger discontinued the poorly selling line.

=== Lazer Tag Team Ops ===
With a ground-up redesign, Shoot the Moon licensed its next generation product to Tiger Electronics. Released at Toy Fair 2004, Lazer Tag Team Ops (LTTO) features a double-barreled design allowing a tagger to identify targets and confirm hits at a distance, and the ability to self-host timed games of up to three teams with various rules and scenarios, following the game with debriefing and score review.

All Lazer Tag-branded products since 2004 are backward compatible and can join LTTO-hosted games, each with various capabilities and limitations.

=== Nerf ===
Nerf branding replaced the now-defunct Tiger Electronics labeling on all products in production beginning in 2012.

In August 2012, Hasbro released an all-new Lazer Tag line, which allows users to integrate an iPhone 3GS, 4, 4S, or iPod Touch unit with the blasters. The associated Lazer Tag app converts the smartphone into a HUD unit, which displays power levels and an online leaderboard. The app offers augmented reality, unlockable attacks, and gear.

== Legacy ==
Like the Photon animated TV series, Worlds of Wonder's Lazer Tag brand inspired Lazer Tag Academy. It was produced by Ruby-Spears Productions, with one season airing on NBC from 1986 to 1987. Three Choose Your Own Adventure-style books are based on the game. The Lazer Tag video game was released in the late 1980s for the ZX Spectrum, Amstrad CPC, and Commodore 64.

As one of America's top hit toys of 1986-1987, Lazer Tag was leveraged by Worlds of Wonder in an ultimatum to force the Nintendo Entertainment System into nationwide retail stores, allowing Nintendo of America to soon lead the country's recovery from the disastrous 1983 video game crash and dominate the industry.

== Reviews ==
- Analog Science Fiction and Fact

== See also ==
- Shooting death of Joseph Falcon in 1987
- Entertech shooting deaths, based on mistaken toy water guns
- Shooting of Andy Lopez in 2013, based on a mistaken airsoft toy gun
