= The Talking Mother Goose =

Toy

Worlds of Wonder's Mother Goose & Hector

The Talking Mother Goose was an animated character toy created by Alchemy II and released by Worlds of Wonder in 1986.

Mother Goose, voiced by Russi Taylor, used classic fairytales and rhymes to entertain and support children as they learned to read.

The toy is controlled via encoded cassette tapes, loaded beneath the wing, which instruct the movements of the toy.

Two versions of Mother Goose were released, both of which featured animated eyes and beak. The first version - commonly referred to as a 'head turner' - has the ability to move its head left and right. This feature was removed from the second version.

== Books and Tapes ==
Mother Goose was a learning aid and encouraged children to read along in the book which accompanied each cassette tape. She would emit a distinctive "honk-honk" sound to indicate the end of each page.

A total of 21 book and tape sets were released for Mother Goose, two of which could incorporate Hector (The Ugly Duckling).

- The Ugly Duckling (operates Hector)
- The Tortoise & the Hare
- Peter & the Wolf
- The Princess and the Pea
- The Frog Prince
- Jack and the Beanstalk
- The Little Red Hen
- Lullabies
- Rumpelstiltskin
- Little Red Riding Hood
- The Emperor's New Clothes
- Cinderella
- The Sleeping Beauty
- Rapunzel
- The Shoemaker and the Elves
- Beauty and the Beast
- Goldilocks and the Three Bears
- Hansel and Gretel
- The Golden Touch
- The Grasshopper and the Ant
- Birthday Surprise (operates Hector)

== Special Collector Editions ==
Two themed book and tape sets were released. 'Birthday Surprise' and 'Lullabies' each included a bonnet and collar for Mother Goose.

== Hector ==
In 1987, Hector - The Ugly Duckling, was released by Worlds of Wonder as a companion to Mother Goose. He was accompanied by 'The Three Little Kittens' cassette which operates both toys.

Modelled on the ugly duckling fairytale, Hector is a grey cygnet with animated eyes and beak. While similar to Mother Goose in his animatronic actions, Hector does not feature a cassette tape player and requires a wired connection to Mother Goose to operate.

With Hector, Worlds of Wonder expanded into nursery rhymes and arguably a younger audience, with Hector becoming the main character and Mother Goose the supporting narrator.

Only Hector compatible tapes are capable of operating the pair, this includes 'The Ugly Duckling' cassette released with Mother Goose herself.

Seven cassette and book sets were created for Hector.

- The Three Little Kittens
- Little Bo Peep
- Hickory Dickory Dock
- Little Boy Blue
- Hey Diddle Diddle
- Mistress Mary
- Little Miss Muffet
