= AG Bear =

Talking teddy bear toy

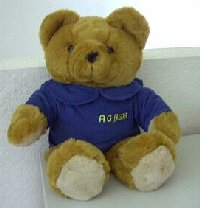
AG Bear (Almost Grown Bear)

AG Bear (short for Almost Grown Bear) is a talking teddy bear that responds to the sound of a human voice. He was designed by Ron Milner and manufactured by Axlon, a company formed by Nolan Bushnell, founder of Atari and Chuck E. Cheese, through his Catalyst Technologies venture capital firm.

The bear wears a durable collared blue shirt with its name embroidered in yellow letters on the front. The shirt has a velcro strap in the back, and the bear has a zipper that secures the internal black voice box.

== Description and history ==
AG Bear's voice is synth-based. The company referred to this as "bear talk". AG Bear was released in several different fur colors: the traditional bear is brown, while other bear colors include white and grey. AG's traditional clothing featured a blue corduroy shirt with a gold AG Bear monogram, although a red corduroy version also exists. Several other versions of the bear were released over time, including GrandPaw AG, GrandMaw AG, Bearonica (AG's sister), and several Baby AG's.

When Axlon was eventually sold to Hasbro, AG Bear production was halted. But in the late 1990s, a multi-year lobbying effort resulted in an agreement to resume production of the original AG in a limited run edition.

== See also ==
- Teddy Ruxpin
