= Teddy Ruxpin =

1985 electronic children's toy

- The BackPack Toys version of Teddy Ruxpin, released in 2006
- Type: Teddy Bear
- Invented by: Ken Forsse
- Company: Worlds of Wonder (1985–1990); Hasbro (1991–1996); Yes! Entertainment (1998–1999); BackPack Toys (2005–2010); Wicked Cool Toys (2017–2019)
- Country: United States
- Availability: 1985–2019
- Materials: polyester fiber
- Slogan: The World's First Animated-Talking Toy

Teddy Ruxpin is an electronic children's toy in the form of an animated-talking bear-like creature brand-defined as an 'Illiop'. The toy's mouth and eyes move while he tells stories about his adventures played on an audio cassette deck built into his back. While the character itself was created by Ken Forsse, the animated-talking toy was designed and built by Forsse’s Alchemy II, Inc. employees, including Larry Larsen and John Davies. Later versions replaced the cassette with a digital cartridge.

At the peak of its popularity, Teddy Ruxpin became one of the best-selling toys of 1985 and 1986. The 2006 version was awarded the 2006 Animated Interactive Plush Toy of the Year award by Creative Child Magazine. A cartoon based on the character debuted in 1986. More than 8 million Teddy Ruxpin toys have been produced. A live-action film adaptation is in development.

== Technology ==
Conventional cassette tapes carry two audio tracks for stereo sound reproduction. Teddy Ruxpin cassettes use the left track for audio and the right track for a control data stream, which in the original 1985 version is encoded as Pulse-position modulation. The data stream operates the motors that animate the eyes and mouth, and it can also reroute the audio signal to Grubby, who is an octopede and the companion toy, by means of a proprietary cable. This allows the two toys to engage in pre-recorded interactions. Grubby only works with the original WoW versions of Teddy Ruxpin.

When a standard audio cassette is played in the second or third generation Teddy Ruxpin, the system detects it, ignores the right audio track, and leaves Teddy motionless. The production eject mechanism was designed by global design firm RKS Design. Early versions of the toy featured three servo motors, later reduced to two, and eventually to one.

== History ==
After the September 1985 debut, various toy makers have produced Teddy Ruxpin over the years. The first was Worlds of Wonder from 1985 until its bankruptcy in 1988. The cut rights were then sold to Hasbro, and produced again from 1991 to 1996. Another version debuted in 1998 by Yes! Entertainment, and another version in 2006 by BackPack Toys. The latest edition was produced by Wicked Cool Toys.

Shortly after his debut, Teddy Ruxpin was recognized as the "Official Spokesbear for the National Center for Missing and Exploited Children" in 1985.

=== Worlds of Wonder ===
Teddy Ruxpin was launched in 1985 by toy manufacturer Worlds of Wonder. Then came the companion toy Grubby, different outfits for Teddy and Grubby, and several other non-animatronic companion toys and characters. This includes two different versions of the bird-like Fobs (one orange, one purple), which are hand puppets with a sock-like, extendable neck. Other hand puppets include the larger Wooly What's-It, three interchangeable Anythings (This, That, and The Other), Tweeg, and L.B. the Bounder.

Other items produced by Worlds of Wonder for Teddy Ruxpin are the Answer Box and Picture Show. Actress Joanna Kerns served as Teddy's spokesperson shortly after its introduction, while at the height of her fame as Maggie Seaver on the ABC-TV sitcom Growing Pains.

Teddy Ruxpin sales peaked in 1986. Worlds of Wonder launched a series of safety messages for children, with different partners including firefighters and the United States Lifesaving Association. WoW became the exclusive distributor for the launch of the smash hit Nintendo Entertainment System, based on leveraging the undeniable strength of Teddy Ruxpin and Lazer Tag.

To retailers who were bitterly adamant against hearing the words "video game" after having survived the video game crash of 1983, WoW salesman Jim Whims distinctly recalled delivering an ultimatum: "If you want to sell Teddy Ruxpin and you want to sell Lazer Tag, you're gonna sell Nintendo as well. And if you feel that strongly about it, then you ought to just resign the line now." Historian Steven Kent wrote: "Anyone who wanted to sell Teddy Ruxpin and Lazer Tag, including Sears and Toys R Us, was going to hear about the Nintendo Entertainment System." WoW received windfall sales commissions from selling the NES, and $800 million in back orders for the Christmas season, mainly for Teddy Ruxpin and Lazer Tag.

In 1987, Worlds of Wonder partnered with Wendy’s to launch a Teddy Ruxpin-themed Kid’s Meal promotion. These are similar to the miniatures produced by Worlds of Wonder, except they are smaller and flocked. Teddy Ruxpin characters joined the Ice Capades program, which toured the country.

In 1987, Worlds of Wonder’s executives misjudged the market, vastly overproducing Teddy Ruxpin at a time when interest was fading and the NES dominated consumer attention. Teddy Ruxpin parts orders strained company assets, a problem worsened when insider trading shook investor trust.

In response to devaluation, WoW issued Non-Investment Grade Bonds, commonly known as junk bonds, in an effort to buoy itself. Although there is some contention as to whether this strategy would have helped, the attempt was made moot by the 1987 stock market crash. Worlds of Wonder filed for bankruptcy protection and was liquidated in 1988. They went through a series of layoffs. The creditors continued to operate the company in receivership until finally closing in late 1990. By 1991, Worlds of Wonder had closed and the remaining assets were liquidated.

=== Playskool ===
In 1991, the Teddy Ruxpin toy line was bought by Hasbro, which produced him under their Playskool line until 1996 using the redesign that had been implemented by WoW. This design is smaller and uses cartridges that resemble 8-track tapes, instead of cassette tapes.

=== Yes! Entertainment ===
From 1993 to 1995, Yes! Entertainment responded to Teddy Ruxpin with an "interactive video" animatronic toy released under the branding "TV Teddy". The TV Teddy system consists of a series of specially encoded VHS cassettes, an RF-transmitter that relays signals encoded on the video track to the toy, and an animatronic RF-receiver consisting of a loudspeaker, and two servos which provide much-simplified eye and mouth movements compared to both the WoW and Playskool versions. The VHS cassettes consist of original opening content specifically designed for Teddy to interact with, followed by previously released videos (among them The Berenstain Bears and titles from Family Home Entertainment) which are encoded with additional content for the animatronic toy.

In 1998, Yes! brought Teddy Ruxpin back to stores for a third time. The toy's size is largely the same as the Playskool version. Yes! returned to using the standard cassette tapes. A small Beanie Baby version of the toy was boxed with the Yes! Teddy Ruxpin based on the popularity of Ty's Beanie Babies at the time. This venture was short-lived, however, as Yes! Entertainment's corporate management and financial troubles ultimately resulted in Alchemy II withdrawing the licensing for Teddy.

=== BackPack Toys ===
In 2005, BackPack Toys announced a fourth version of Teddy Ruxpin, which replaced the audio tapes with digital ROM cartridges.

=== Wicked Cool Toys ===
Wicked Cool Toys began production of a new version of Teddy Ruxpin in late 2017. This Teddy Ruxpin does not come with physical cartridges, instead being programmed with three stories inside of the toy. Additional stories are available for purchase in the mobile app.

== Film adaptation ==
In May 2018, Alchemy and The Jim Henson Company signed a deal to make a new Teddy Ruxpin series, animated as digital puppetry, aimed at preschoolers. The series was eventually scrapped.

In September 2021, dj2 Entertainment picked up the television and film rights to Teddy Ruxpin. Development on a live-action film, penned by Chris Hazzard and Mike Fontana, begun by September 2025 under Amazon MGM Studios, produced by Dmitri M. Johnson and Michael Lawrence Goldberg of Story Kitchen, alongside Dwayne Johnson, Dany Garcia and Hiram Garcia of Seven Bucks Productions.

== Book and cassette episode list ==
=== Worlds of Wonder ===
Worlds of Wonder produced the largest number of stories:

Teddy Ruxpin episodes produced by Worlds of Wonder
No.	Title	Guest characters
1	"The Airship: Discover a Whole New World"	Leota the Woodsprite
Teddy and Grubby meet Newton Gimmick, and the three begin the search for the treasure.
2	"The Missing Princess: You've Got to Take Care of You"	Mudblups, Prince Arin, Wooly, the Wizard, Gutangs, Princess Aruzia
Teddy, Grubby, and Newton Gimmick are captured by the Mudblups and meet Prince Arin and, later, Wooly. Then they go to the Hard-to-Find City to save Princess Aruzia from the Gutangs.
3	"The Wooly What's-It: Learning Can Be Fun!"	Wooly, Leota, the Woodsprites and the Elves
Teddy, Grubby, and Newton Gimmick travel to Wooly's house and later introduce him to Leota the Wood Sprite.
4	"Teddy and the Mudblups: Is Being Neat Hard to Do?"	Mudblups
Teddy, Grubby, and Newton Gimmick are out for an adventure when they are captured by Mudblups, again!
5	"Tweeg and the Bounders: You Have to Earn the Things Worth Having"	Tweeg, L.B. and the Bounders
Teddy introduces the character of Tweeg, a bumbling, greedy sort who apparently is always trying to get rich off making gold.
6	"Grubby's Romance: Falling in Love is Something Special"	Karen, Tweeg, L.B., various other bugs
Teddy, Grubby, and Newton Gimmick are shrunken by Gimmick's reducing machine. Grubby meets a caterpillar and falls in love.
7	"Grunge Music: Tap Your Feet to the Beat"	Grunges
Teddy and Grubby hang out with the Grunges and learn about music and rhythm.
8	"Take A Good Look: See the Ordinary in an Extraordinary Way"	Fuzz the Fob
Teddy, Grubby, and Newton Gimmick are shrunken by the power of Gimmick's new machine using one of the 7 crystals. They explore their "new world" and avoid being stomped on by Fuzz.
9	"All About Bears: When is a Bear Not a Bear?"	.
Teddy and Grubby discuss real-life bears and similar species such as koalas and pandas.
10	"The Story of the Faded Fobs: Helping Each Other Makes Everybody Happy"	Fobs, Wooly
Teddy, Grubby, and Newton Gimmick discover some faded Fobs and, with the help of Wooly, try to help them get their colors back.
11	"Teddy Ruxpin's Birthday: A Day to Say Hurray"	Leota, Grunges, Wooly, Fobs
Teddy, Grubby, and Newton Gimmick celebrate Teddy's Birthday with fun, adventure, and many friends!
12	"Teddy Ruxpin Lullabies: Warm and Cuddly Songs to Dream By"	Fobs, Leota, Wooly, L.B., and the Bounders
Teddy Ruxpin sings all his favorite lullabies for his friends.
13	"Teddy's Winter Adventure: A Perfect Time for Sharing"	Grunges, Wooly, Fobs, Leota, Tweeg, L.B.
Teddy, Grubby, and Newton Gimmick enjoy the snow and exchanging presents for the winter holiday with their friends.
14	"The Third Crystal: Can Teddy Solve the Mystery?"	Fuzz, Tweeg and L.B.
Teddy, Grubby, and Newton Gimmick must solve the mystery of the Third Crystal and avoid Tweeg.
15	"Grundo Beach Party: Sun and Sand With Friends Can Be Fun"	Grunges, Fobs
Teddy, Grubby, and Newton Gimmick are having a Beach Party with the Grunges.
16	"Teddy Ruxpin's Christmas: A Musical Celebration"	Almost all Series Characters Pictured
Teddy, Grubby, and Newton Gimmick host a Christmas Party.
17	"The Medicine Wagon: Teddy, Grubby, and Gimmick are Tricked by Tweeg"	Tweeg, L.B. and the Bounders
.
18	"Autumn Adventure: Teddy and Grubby Find Out How Fun Autumn Can Be"	Fobs, Wooly, Grunges
Teddy, Grubby, and Newton Gimmick have fun singing about the fall and dressing up in costumes to try to scare their friends.
19	"Double Grubby: Gimmick's Invention Duplicates Lots of Trouble"	No additional characters
Teddy, Grubby, and Newton Gimmick deal with a duplicate of Grubby after Gimmick's new crystal-using Duplicator machine makes a copy of more than just an apple!
20	"The Day Teddy Met Grubby: Do You Remember The Day You Met Your Best Friend?"	Teddy's Mother
Teddy tells the story of how he met Grubby for the first time back home in Rillonia.
21	"Gizmos and Gadgets: Teddy and His Friends Make an Important Discovery"	Fobs
Teddy, Grubby, and Newton Gimmick come up with an invention for Gimmick to present at King Nogburt's Logic Faire.
22	"The Mushroom Forest: You Can Be Anything You Want to Be"	The Anythings
Teddy, Grubby, and Newton Gimmick get lost in the Mushroom Forest and meet some new friends and sing some songs.
23	"Teddy Ruxpin Summertime: A Fun-Filled Musical Summer"	Grunges, Wooly, Fobs
Teddy, Grubby, and Newton Gimmick have fun going camping, swimming, and doing various other summer activities.
24	"Lost in Boggley Woods: Teddy and His Friends Meet the Wogglies"	Wogglies
Teddy, Grubby, and Newton Gimmick get lost in Boggley Woods and meet the Wogglies.
25	"Wooly and the Giant Snowzos: Do You Believe Everything You Hear?"	Wogglies, Fuzz, Wooly, Snowzos
Teddy, Grubby, Newton Gimmick, Fuzz, and Wooly are spending a cold winter's night when they get unexpected visitors.
26	"Anything in the Soup: Will the Anythings end up in Grunge Gumbo?"	Grunges, Anythings
While Teddy, Grubby, and Newton Gimmick are making gumbo with the Grunges, they meet some interesting creatures.
27	"Grundo Springtime Singtime: A Springtime Sing-Along for One and All!"	Grunges and Fobs (Wooly and Newton Gimmick appear in the audience, but have no lines.)
.
28	"One More Spot: Teddy, Grubby, And Gimmick Meet Amanda the Ladybug"	Amanda the Ladybug, Ladybug team, various other bugs
Teddy, Grubby, and Newton Gimmick meet Amanda and decide to use Gimmick's reducing machine to shrink themselves to go to the Bug Fair.
29	"Tweeg Gets the Tweezles: A Healthy Attitude Works Wonders"	Tweeg, L.B. and the Bounders
.
30	"Uncle Grubby: Grubby Finds Three Good Reasons to Be Patient"	Bounders, Wooly, Fobs
Teddy, Grubby, and Newton Gimmick must help take care of some baby Fobs and find their parents.
31	"The Sign of a Friend: Teddy and Grubby Meet a Silent Friend"	Leota, Katie, and the Woodsprites
.
32	"Teddy Ruxpin Lullabies II: More Dreamy Songs for Sleepy Time"	.
.
33	"Teddy Ruxpin Sings Love Songs: A Special Collection Of Teddy's Favorites"	Almost all Series Characters Pictured
.
34	"The Do-Along Songbook: Sing Along With Teddy Ruxpin and His Friends"	Fobs
Teddy, Grubby, and Newton Gimmick teach a variety of fun, active, and dancing songs.
35	"Quiet Please: Teddy Sings His Way Through A Quiet Day"	.
.
36	"Safe at Home with Teddy Ruxpin: Grubby's Special Assignment"	No additional characters
Teddy and Grubby investigate the home and discover ways that you can be safe, healthy, and happy at home.
37	"Water Safety with Teddy Ruxpin: The Fobs Learn How To Swim"	Fobs, Grunge Lifeguard
Teddy teaches a swimming class to the Fobs while Grubby participates and learns some water safety skills himself.
38	"Fire Safety with Teddy Ruxpin: Teddy's Junior Fire Patrol"	Fobs
Teddy teaches fire safety to the fobs while Grubby helps and learns some fire safety skills himself.
39	"Teddy Ruxpin Visits the Dentist: Sponsored by Crest"	.
.

=== Other ===
Worlds of Wonder created two devices that work only with Teddy Ruxpin: the Picture Show and Answer Box. Neither of these work with Grubby. The Picture Show cassettes use slide wheels, similar to the View Master:

- Big Little Wooly
- Gimmick Learns a Lesson
- The Great Grundo Groundrace
- Teddy & The Surf Grunges
- Teddy's Underwater Rescue
- Tweeg's Lemonade Stand
- Wedding in Grundo

The Answer Box cassettes are these:

- Color My World
- Counting Is Fun
- Easy as ABC
- Just About the Size of It
- Learn About Opposites
- Shapes are Everywhere
- Up, Down and All Around

== Book and cartridge episode list ==
No.	Series	Title	Short Summary	Featured Characters
1	Included	"The Airship: Discover a Whole New World"	Teddy and Grubby meet Newton Gimmick, and the three begin the search for the treasure.	Leota the Woodsprite
2	Treasure Series 1	"Wooly and The Wizard: Helping to Solve the Mystery"		
3	Treasure Series 1	"Captured By Mudblups: Sometimes You Have to Change Your Plans"		
4	Treasure Series 2	"The Missing Princess: You've Got to Take Care of You"	Teddy, Grubby, and Newton Gimmick are captured by the Mudblups and meet Prince Arin and, later, Wooly. Then they go to the Hard-to-Find City to save Princess Aruzia from the Gutangs.	Mudblups, Prince Arin, Wooly, the Wizard, Gutangs, Princess Aruzia
5	Treasure Series 2	"Treasure: Knowing What's Really Valuable is Important"		
6	Adventure Series 1	"Teddy Ruxpin's Birthday: A Day to Say Hurray"	Teddy, Grubby, and Newton Gimmick celebrate Teddy's Birthday with fun, adventure, and many friends!	Leota, Grunges, Wooly, Fobs
7	Adventure Series 1	"The Day Teddy Met Grubby: Do You Remember The Day You Met Your Best Friend?"	Teddy tells the story of how he met Grubby for the first time back home in Rilonia.	Teddy's Mother
8	Adventure Series 2	"Grubby's Romance: Falling in Love is Something Special"	Teddy, Grubby, and Newton Gimmick are shrunken by Gimmick's reducing machine. Grubby meets a caterpillar and falls in love.	Karen, Tweeg, L.B., various other bugs
9	Adventure Series 3	"Take A Good Look: See the Ordinary in an Extraordinary Way"	Teddy, Grubby, and Newton Gimmick are shrunken by the power of Gimmick's new machine using one of the 7 crystals. They explore their "new world" and avoid being stomped on by Fuzz.	Fuzz the Fob
10	Music Series 1	"Teddy Ruxpin Lullabies: Warm and Cuddly Songs to Dream By"	Teddy Ruxpin sings all his favorite lullabies for his friends.	Fobs, Leota
11	Music Series 1	"Teddy Ruxpin's Christmas: A Musical Celebration"	Teddy, Grubby, and Newton Gimmick host a Christmas Party.	Almost all Series Characters Pictured

== Voice actors ==
Phil Baron was the voice actor on all tapes and on the TV show The Adventures of Teddy Ruxpin. He left the entertainment industry in the 1990s to become a cantor. Baron is currently the only voice actor officially associated with the property, as Teddy Ruxpin has been the only character in the storyline requiring updated voice recordings for new projects. Will Ryan voiced Grubby in the 1980s and returned as Grubby in the early 1990s for a musical project.

Tony Pope was the original voice of Newton Gimmick. He and other AlchemyII voice actors in the 1980s did not reprise their roles in the television series because production was moved to Canada, starring John Stocker as Gimmick. Baron and Ryan provided the voices of Teddy and Grubby, respectively, in every project from 1985 up until Ryan's death in 2021.

Ryan voiced the character of Tweeg in the adventure series. John Koensgen voiced Tweeg for the television series. Katie Leigh and Russi Taylor did the voices of Princess Aruzia and Leota the Woodsprite, respectively, on the book-and-tapes. For the TV series, Holly Larocque and Abby Hagyard took over the roles.

== The Adventures of Teddy Ruxpin ==
The Adventures of Teddy Ruxpin is a television series that ran from 1986 to 1987. In it, Teddy Ruxpin leaves his homeland in Rillonia with his friend Grubby in search of adventure. They meet an inventor named Newton Gimmick, who accompanies them on their quest for the Treasure of Grundo. The trio unexpectedly find six crystals with different meanings and powers. These crystals enable the Monsters and Villains Organization (MAVO) to have absolute power over the land.

Their leader, Quellor, wants to make sure that an Illiop never possesses the crystals. Elsewhere, a less pronounced threat routinely besieges the trio: the wannabe villain Jack W. Tweeg, a greedy troll intending to join MAVO. The sixty-five episode series unfolds gradually, as the trio meet interesting and often friendly creatures while visiting intriguing lands and going on wondrous adventures.

== Unofficial tape injunction ==
At least two other companies (Vector Intercontinental and Veritel Learning Systems) produced tapes that work with the Teddy Ruxpin toy. Worlds of Wonder successfully sued them in 1986, claiming the effect these tapes had on Teddy were too similar to the results of playing the proprietary recordings, and the courts in Ohio and Texas ordered the infringing tapes off the market.

== In popular culture ==
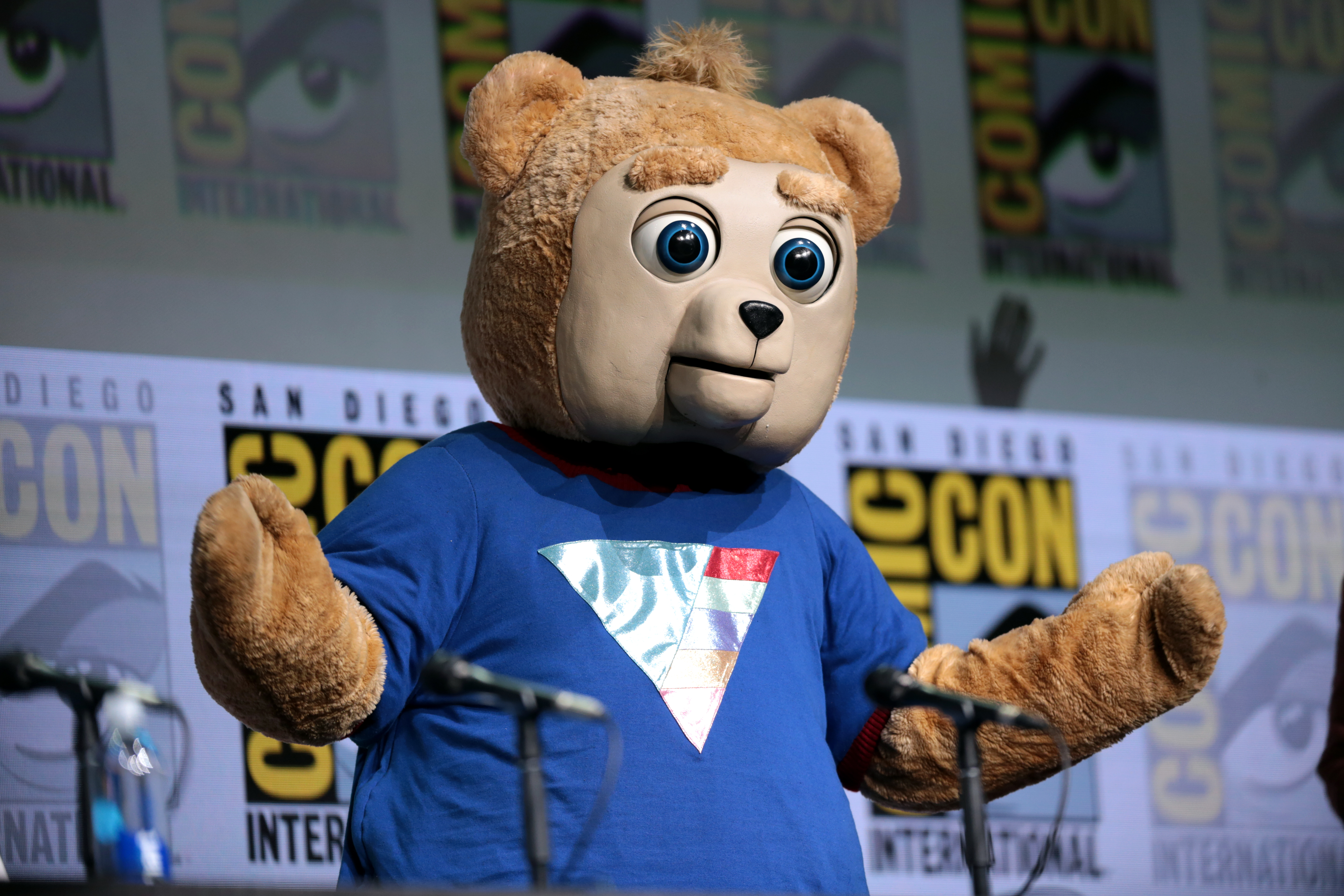
The titular Brigsby Bear at the 2017 San Diego Comic-Con

The 2017 film Brigsby Bear featured an animatronic bear suit, similar to the one in the animatronic pilot for The Adventures of Teddy Ruxpin. In the film, the suit is used in the production of a children's television series. The suit's mouth and eyes move when it plays a tape, just like the original toy. It is shown accepting both compact cassette and VHS tapes, both technologies that the toy utilized.

In the 2016 horror survival video game Tattletail, the character of Mama Tattletail is based on Teddy Ruxpin in that she has a built-in cassette player through which she tells stories.

A Teddy Ruxpin toy appears in the 2021 film House of Gucci.

== See also ==
- AG Bear
