= Buddy L =

American Toy Company

Buddy L (also known as Buddy "L" or Buddy-L) was an American toy brand and company founded in 1920 as the Buddy L Toy Company in East Moline, Illinois, by Fred Lundahl.

== History ==
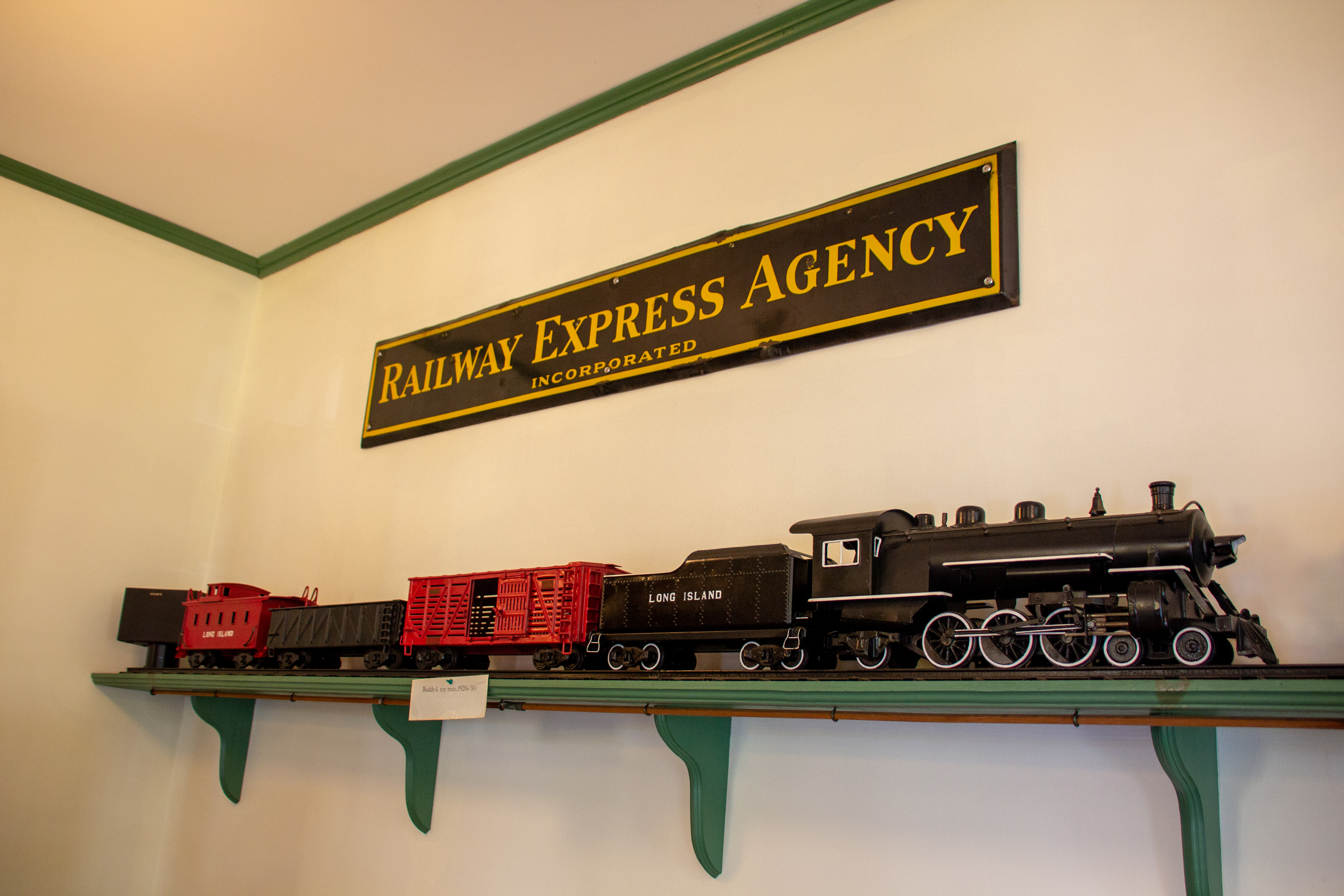
Buddy L toy train, 1920s-30s, Long Island

Buddy "L" toys were originally manufactured by the Moline Pressed Steel Company, which was started by Fred A. Lundahl in 1910. The company originally manufactured automobile fenders and other stamped auto body parts for the automobile industry, instead of toy products. The company primarily supplied parts for the McCormick-Deering line of farm implements and the International Harvester Company for its trucks. Moline Pressed Steel did not begin manufacturing toys until 1921. Mr. Lundhal wanted to make something new, different, and durable for his son Arthur. He designed and produced an all-steel miniature truck, reportedly a model of an International Harvester truck made from 18- and 20-gauge steel which had been discarded to the company's scrap pile.

Buddy L made such products as toy cars, dump trucks, delivery vans, fire engines, construction equipment, and trains. Fred Lundahl used to manufacture for International Harvester trucks. He started by making a toy dump truck out of steel scraps for his son Buddy. Soon after, he started selling Buddy L "toys for boys", made of pressed steel. Many were large enough for a child to straddle, propelling himself with his feet. Others were pull toys. A pioneer in the steel-toy field, Lundahl persuaded Marshall Field's and F. A. O. Schwarz to carry his line. He did very well until the Great Depression, then sold the company.

In 1941, Henry Katz and Company purchased Buddy L from the Molene Manufacturing Company. From 1976 to 1990, Buddy L was owned by Richard Keats, a well-known New York toy designer who went to work for Buddy L the day after he graduated from Brown University in 1948. By 1978, the company was located in Clifton, New Jersey.

In 1990, Keats sold Buddy L to SLM International. SLM sold Buddy L off in 1995 under bankruptcy protection. By 2010, Buddy L was owned by Empire Industries of Boca Raton, Florida, a subsidiary of Empire of Carolina.

In the 1990s, Buddy L made Splatter Up, a wet version of T-ball.

On 31 August 2000, the Consumer Product Safety Commission issued a recall for about 113,000 battery-powered children's riding vehicles, marketed as "Power Drivers" or "Buddy L", for repair. The vehicles' battery chargers can overheat, presenting fire and injury hazards to children.

In November 2000, Empire of Carolina and its wholly owned subsidiary, Empire Industries, Inc., filed for bankruptcy and, in July 2001, Empire Industries was sold substantially to Alpha International, Inc, also known as the Gearbox Pedal Car Company, of Cedar Rapids, Iowa (renamed as Gearbox Toys and now owned by J. Lloyd International).

== Gay Toys, Inc. v. Buddy L Corp. ==
Buddy L sued Gay Toys for copyright infringement of a model airplane. The United States Court of Appeals for the Sixth Circuit decided in 1981 that Buddy L's copyright was violated. The case was an important milestone in the legal formulation of useful articles.
