= Punch-Out (disambiguation) =

Punch-Out may refer to:

== Video games ==
- Punch-Out!!, a series of boxing video games made by Nintendo
  - Punch-Out!! (1984 video game), a 1984 arcade game
  - Punch-Out!! (1987 video game), a 1987 video game for the NES originally known as Mike Tyson's Punch-Out!!
  - Punch-Out!! (2009 video game), a 2009 video game for the Wii
  - Super Punch-Out!! (1984 video game), a 1984 arcade game
  - Super Punch-Out!!, a 1994 video game for the Super NES

== Other ==
- Glossary of baseball terms#punch out, another name for a strike out, mainly if the third strike is a called third strike
- "Punch Out" (Ugly Betty), the nineteenth episode from the dramedy series Ugly Betty
- Punch in/out, in multitrack recording and production
- Punchout (comics), a mutant in the Marvel Comics universe

== See also ==
- Knockout
- Punch (disambiguation)
- Out (disambiguation)
