= List of Punch-Out!! characters =

List of characters from Punch-Out!!

Punch-Out!! (Note: Japanese: パンチアウト!!, Hepburn: Panchi-Auto!!) is a series of boxing video games created by Genyo Takeda and Makoto Wada, and published by Nintendo. The main protagonist and player character of the series is Little Mac, a short boxer from the Bronx who climbs the ranks of the fictional World Video Boxing Association (WVBA) by challenging various opponents. These opponents come from different countries and feature various ethnic stereotypes associated with their place of origin.

== Concept and creation ==
In the original Punch-Out!! arcade game, the characters were named by Genyo Takeda, who chose names with the intention of appealing to the American market. The developers used the two screens in the cabinet to be able to display the opponents' face, which they intended to ensure that players would have a more vivid recollection of their faces. The characters in this game were animated in conjunction with Studio Junio, who used art by Shigeru Miyamoto as reference for the animations. Many of the characters in the 1984 title Super Punch-Out!! are similar to each other by design because they are variants of the same programming; the code recycling and the lack of character differentiation outside of crude nationalistic stereotypes is a result of the game's limited development time and storage resources. For example, Soda Popinski's obnoxious laughter is also used for Mr. Sandman, Bald Bull, and Super Macho Man, and in other Nintendo games, such as for Ganon in the Game Over screen of the game Zelda II: The Adventure of Link.

The 2009 release of Punch-Out!! for Wii is primarily made up by characters from Punch-Out!! for the Nintendo Entertainment System, who play similarly to the characters in this version. They intended to ensure that the player could beat the first three opponents just by throwing punches. Their models in the Wii game were based on the original designs, put into 3D and given cel shading. The fighters also received new fights that were more difficult in a mode called "Title Defense".

== Introduced in Punch-Out!! (1984) ==
Name	Nationality	Description
Little Mac	American	Little Mac (Note: Japanese: リトル・マック, Hepburn: Ritoru Makku) is a 17-year-old boxer from the Bronx and the main protagonist of the series. In the NES game, he was made shorter than the opponents. He appears in each subsequent entry of the series, as well as a playable character in the fighting games Super Smash Bros. for Nintendo 3DS and Wii U and Super Smash Bros. Ultimate. His weight is 107 lbs.
Glass Joe	French	Glass Joe (Note: Japanese: グラス・ジョー, Hepburn: Gurasu Jō) is a boxer born in Paris, France. He was originally designed by Shigeru Miyamoto and was revised by Makoto Wada for the NES game. He is voiced by Christian Bernard in the Wii game. He is the player's first opponent in every game in which he appears, and is famous for his weakness and cowardice. These elements are considered by critics to be stereotypes of French people. His weight is 110 lbs with a record of 1-99 (1 KO).
Piston Hurricane	Cuban	Piston Hurricane (Note: Japanese: ピストン・ハリケーン, Hepburn: Pisuton Harikēn) is a boxer from Havana, Cuba. Piston Hurricane reappeared in the SNES version of Super Punch-Out!!. His weight is 170 lbs with a record of 21-10 (11 KO).
Bald Bull	Turkish	Bald Bull (Note: Japanese: ボールド・ブル, Hepburn: Bōrudo Buru) is a boxer born in Istanbul, Turkey, created by Shigeru Miyamoto. His next appearances were in the 1985 arcade game Arm Wrestling as "Mask X", in the 1987 video game Punch-Out!! for NES as Champion of the Major Circuit, in the 1994 video game Super Punch-Out!!, and in the 2009 video game Punch-Out!! for Wii. Bald Bull features an instant knockdown attack called the Bull Charge, where Bald Bull rears back and charges forward. In the first fight against Bald Bull in the NES game, the camera flash fired by a man in the audience indicates the exact moment Little Mac can counter Bald Bull's attack. This detail was revealed in 2009 by Makoto Wada in an interview with the former president of Nintendo, Satoru Iwata. His weight is 298 lbs with a record of 34-4 (29 KO).
Kid Quick	American	Kid Quick (Note: Japanese: キッド・クイック, Hepburn: Kiddo Kuikku) is a boxer from Brooklyn, New York, whose only appearance was in the arcade version of Punch-Out!!. He was later modernized as Disco Kid in Punch-Out!! for Wii due to his "dated representation". His weight is 210 lbs.
Pizza Pasta	Italian	Pizza Pasta (Note: Japanese: ピッツァ・パスタ, Hepburn: Pittsa Pasuta) is a boxer born in Napoli city. His only appearance is in the arcade version of Punch-Out!. His weight is 230 lbs.
Mr. Sandman	American	Mr. Sandman (Note: Japanese: ミスター・サンドマン, Hepburn: Misutā Sandoman) is a 31-year-old black boxer from Philadelphia, United States, and was designed by Shigeru Miyamoto. He is voiced by Riley Inge in the Wii game. His weight is 284 lbs with a record of 31-0 (31 KO).

== Introduced in Super Punch-Out!! (1984) ==
Name	Nationality	Description
Bear Hugger	Canadian	Bear Hugger (Note: Japanese: ベア・ハッガー, Hepburn: Bea Haggā) is a Canadian boxer from Saskatoon, Saskatchewan. After an appearance as the second opponent in Super Punch-Out!! for the Super NES, he appeared in Punch-Out!! for the Wii, where his hometown was changed to Salmon Arm, British Columbia. His weight is 440 lbs with a record of 17-12 (14 KO).
Dragon Chan	Hongkonger	Dragon Chan is a boxer from British Hong Kong. (Hong Kong was a British crown colony during his appearances.) His weight is 130 lbs with a record of 15-7 (13 KO).
Soda Popinski	Russian	Soda Popinski (Note: Japanese: ソーダ・ポピンスキー, Hepburn: Sōda Popinsukī) is a 35 year old Soviet (Russian in releases after 1992) boxer born in Moscow. He was originally called Vodka Drunkenski, but his name was changed to Soda Popinski in subsequent entries due to marketing concerns with younger audiences. He drinks vodka in the first game, but drinks soda in later versions in alignment with the censorship. He drinks soda in the Wii version to recover health, either during combat or after being knocked down. If prevented from doing so during combat, he becomes enraged. A version of the character appears in an unlicensed Punch-Out!! PC game titled Frank Bruno's Boxing, where he is named "Andra Puncharedov". The character is the namesake of Soda Popinski's, a bar located in Nob Hill, San Francisco, California since 2012. The bar's name is an allusion to a "USSR-era Siberian hunting lodge" which references the character's in-universe depiction, serving a double shot of Russian vodka served neat named Vodka Drunkenski. His record is 237 lbs with a record of 33-2 (24 KO).
Great Tiger	Indian	Great Tiger (Note: Japanese: グレート・タイガー, Hepburn: Gurēto Taigā) is a 29-year-old boxer born in Mumbai. He first appeared in Super Punch-Out!! for arcade, and later appeared in Punch-Out!! for the NES in 1987 and Punch-Out!! for the Wii in 2009, the latter featuring Sumit Seru as his voice actor. He uses teleportation in his fight, and his turban has a jewel that flashes when he is about to perform an attack. He also uses a flying carpet, and in the NES version, the skin of a Bengal tiger is seen hanging on the post in his corner of the ring. These have all been referred to as stereotypes of Indian people. Davey Nieves of Comics Beat commented that "Decent people in India or Pakistan have been seeing much more offensive stereotypes in the media for years." Reason for which he stated that "looking at Great Tiger with his tiger skin robe dangling behind him like he's opening a nightclub is probably not the worst they've ever seen on a screen." Kakuchopurei believed that the stereotypes helped make him more memorable. His weight is 132 lbs with a record of 24-5 (3 KO).
Super Macho Man	American	Super Macho Man (Note: Japanese: スーパー・マッチョマン, Hepburn: Sūpā Matchoman) is a 27-year-old (28 in Super Punch Out (SNES) American boxer from Hollywood, California. He first appeared in Super Punch-Out!! for the arcades, where he was the final boss of the game. He later took this role again in the Gold version of Punch-Out!!. However, in Mike Tyson's Punch-Out!! he appeared as the penultimate game boss. Macho Man also appeared in Super Punch-Out!! for the SNES, and Punch-Out!! for the Wii, where he was voiced by Mike Inglehart. An ESRB description of Punch-Out!! for the Wii mentioned a boxer who flexed his pectoral muscles and glutes, leading editor Stephen Totilo to question whether this was Super Macho Man or not. Since appearing in Super Punch-Out!! for the arcades, Super Macho Man has received generally positive reception. He is considered a memorable character of the franchise. Super Macho Man appeared on the cover of an issue of GameFan magazine, GamesRadar editor Chris Antista included it as an exception in his list of the most embarrassing gaming magazine covers. IGN editor Jesse Schedeen named Super Macho Man one of the series' top fighters, describing him as a "thinly veiled parody mash-up of "Superstar" Billy Graham and another famous fighter who goes by the nickname "Macho Man". GamesRadar editor Brett Elston states that Super Macho Man embodies the stereotypes of American celebrities of being "too tanned, narcissistic, materialistic, and obsessed with fame, money, and looks." He added that Super Macho Man was not just a parody of celebrities, but "Hollywood and American's fascination with celebrities." In the video game for NES he has two versions of his signature move called Super Spin Punch. One in which he performs a spin after a few seconds to be still and another in which he performs several multiple spins that could instantly knock the player down. His weight is 242 lbs with a record of 35-0 (29 KO).

== Introduced in Mike Tyson's Punch-Out!! (1987) ==
Name	Nationality	Description
Doc Louis	American	Doc Louis (Note: Japanese: ドック・ルイス, Hepburn: Dokku Ruisu) is a former heavyweight boxing champion and Little Mac's trainer, who stands in Mac's corner during fights. Between rounds, Doc provides Mac with advice, encouragement, or sometimes a humorous anecdote. He is the creator of the "Star Punch", the most powerful move in Mac's arsenal. In the Wii title, he has a fondness for chocolate bars. In Punch-Out!! for Wii, he is voiced by Riley Inge. Doc Louis appears as the sole challenger in the Club Nintendo exclusive Doc Louis's Punch-Out!!.
Von Kaiser	German	Von Kaiser (Note: Japanese: フォン・カイザー, Hepburn: Fon Kaizā) (From the Emperor) is a 42-year-old German boxer born in Berlin. He is an instructor of this same sport in an unknown military academy. Von Kaiser made his first appearance in Mike Tyson's Punch-Out!! for the NES in 1987. Years later, he returned in the installment of Punch-Out!! for Wii released in 2009, now voiced by Horst Laxon. In both Punch-Out!! games, he is the second opponent Little Mac faces on the Minor Circuit, having a record of 23 wins and 13 losses. In addition, he appeared with Bald Bull in a micro game of WarioWare: Smooth Moves, in which Referee Mario has to count to ten to win. His weight is 144 lbs with a record of 23 -13 (10 KO).
Piston Honda	Japanese	Piston Honda (Note: Japanese: ピストン本田, Hepburn: Pisuton Honda) is a 28-year-old Japanese boxer born in Tokyo. He first appeared in Punch-Out!! (NES), where he is the Minor Circuit Champion. In Punch-Out!! for the Wii, his name is changed to Piston Hondo, (Note: Japanese: ピストン・ホンドー, Hepburn: Pisuton Hondō) to avoid legal problems. He is voiced by Japanese voice actor Kenji Takahashi. His weight is 174 lbs with a record of 26-1 (18 KO).
Don Flamenco	Spaniard	Don Flamenco (Note: Japanese: ドン・フラメンコ, Hepburn: Don Furamenko) is a 23-year-old Spanish boxer born in Madrid. His first appearance was in Punch-Out!! for the NES. He did not make another appearance until Punch-Out!! for the Wii where he was voiced by Juan Amador Pulido. He is considered to have multiple stereotypes of Spaniards, GamesRadar writer Brett Elston citing things like him being a bullfighter, holding a rose, and his vanity as examples. The Escapist writer Sumantra Lahiri felt that his "pretty boy" stereotype was a common stereotype held by people aware of Spain's culture. His weight is 152 lbs with a record of 22-3 (9 KO).
King Hippo	Pacific Islander	King Hippo (Note: Japanese: キング・ヒッポー, Hepburn: Kingu Hippō) is an obese boxer who hails from a fictional island in the South Pacific. In Mike Tyson's Punch-Out!, his navel is taped over providing a target for Mac, and once hit in the body, he constantly tries to pull his shorts up. Hippo is the only opponent in the game who never gets up once Mac puts him on the mat. In the Wii version's title defense, he uses a manhole cover to protect his torso. King Hippo appeared blue in cartoon Captain N: The Game Master, where he is played by Garry Chalk. His record is 18-9 (18 KO).
Mike Tyson/Mr. Dream	American	Mike Tyson (Note: Japanese: マイク・タイソン, Hepburn: Maiku Taison) is the final opponent of the original release of Punch-Out!! for the NES, titled Mike Tyson's Punch-Out!!, whom Little Mac faces in a bout called "The Dream Fight", in which his boxing record is 31-0 with 27 KOs. After Tyson's contract with Nintendo expired, he was replaced with Mr. Dream (Note: Japanese: Mr. ドリーム, Hepburn: Misutā Dorīmu), a boxer from Dreamland and with a total record of 99-0 with 99 KOs. Writer Kevin Wong described him as a "completely broken video game character who can knock you out with a single uppercut," adding that "that's just fun and meaningful when you're fighting Iron Mike himself. With Mr. Dream, it's just pathetic." Writer Jesse Schedeen criticized the character, saying that "he has never given us the same sense of joy and accomplishment." The licencing agreement with Tyson expired shortly after his 1990 loss to James "Buster" Douglas in Tokyo. Mr. Dream's weight is 235 lbs with a record of 99-0 (99 KO) while Mike Tyson weighed 218 lbs and had a record of 31-0 (27 KO).

== Introduced in Super Punch-Out!! (1994) ==
Name	Nationality	Description
Gabby Jay	French	Gabby Jay (Note: Japanese: ガビー・ジェイ, Hepburn: Gabī Jei) is a 56-year-old boxer from Paris, whose record is 99 losses and 1 win against Glass Joe. Bit Mob editor Andrew Fitch criticized Gabby Jay, calling him a "wannabe" Glass Joe. Allgame editor Skyler Miller agreed with this sentiment, commenting that while humorous, he is not quite as "out there". In his article "One and Done: Nine Videogame Characters Who Were Never Heard From Again", editor John Teti listed Gabby Jay, stating that it was "not easy to replace a legend, but that was the bum hand dealt to Gabby Jay". He added that Gabby Jay not appearing in the Wii Punch-Out!! in favor of Glass Joe was something that Star Trek fans would deem "the Dr. Pulaski treatment".
Bob Charlie	Jamaican	Bob Charlie (Note: Japanese: ボブ・チャーリー, Hepburn: Bobu Chārī) is a 26-year-old boxer from Kingston, Jamaica, whose only appearance was in the SNES version of Super Punch-Out!!. Kevin Wong criticized the character saying that "not only does he suck as a fighter, but he dances during his match while his manager yells 'shuck and jive' at him."
Masked Muscle	Mexican	Masked Muscle (Note: Japanese: マスクド・マッスル, Hepburn: Masukudo Massuru) is a 29-year-old former Luchador masked man from Mexico City, whose only appearance was in Super Punch-Out!!. His main attack is to spit in Little Mac's eyes to temporarily blind him. Writer Kevin Wong described it as "a missed opportunity," commenting that "the developers could have done something really cool with a professional wrestling character, but instead opted for a lazy joke."
Aran Ryan	Irish	Aran Ryan (Note: Japanese: アラン・ライアン, Hepburn: Aran Raian) is an Irish boxer born in Dublin. His first appearance was in Super Punch-Out!! for the Super NES, and most recently appeared in the Wii video game Punch-Out!!, where he was voiced by Stephen Webster. While he was more sedate in Super Punch-Out!!, cheating occasionally, the Wii version depicts him as a loud, boisterous cheater. The developer Bryce Holliday describes him as the game's "resident hooligan". In discussing Ryan's fighting style, GamePro editor Will Herring described it as being momentum-based. GamesRadar writer Brett Elston commented that his uncontrollable rage, his disposition to cheating, his love for fighting, and his penchant for adorning his clothing with four-leaf clovers were strong stereotypes of the Irish people.
Heike Kagero	Japanese	Heike Kagero (Note: Japanese: 平家 陽炎, Hepburn: Heike Kagerō) is a 19-year-old Japanese boxer born in Osaka. His only appearance in the SNES version of Super Punch-Out!!.
Mad Clown	Italian	Mad Clown (Note: Japanese: マッド・クラウン, Hepburn: Maddo Kuraun) is a 27-year-old Italian clown from Milan who decided to take up boxing. He made his only appearance in the SNES version of Super Punch-Out!!. Mad Clown began his life as a famous opera singer, however he suffered from a nervous breakdown. Later he dedicated himself to being a clown, and after failing at that as well, he decided to dedicate himself to boxing.
Narcis Prince	British	Narcis Prince (Note: Japanese: ナルシス・プリンス, Hepburn: Narushisu Purinsu) is a 20-year-old British boxer from London that appeared for the first and last time in the SNES video game Super Punch-Out!!. Kevin Wong commented on this by saying that "the privileged handsome boy from across the pond definitely has the most elegant boxing style of all the fighters in Super Punch-Out!!."
Hoy Quarlow	Chinese	Hoy Quarlow (Note: Japanese: 回 鍋肉, Hepburn: Pinyin: Huí Guō Ròu) is an 78-year-old Chinese boxer born on Beijing, whose first and last appearance was in Super Punch-Out!! for SNES. Hoy Quarlow is the only boxer who carries a weapon in his hands, in this case a stick, he also has a "sick arsenal of special moves".
Rick Bruiser	Unknown	Rick Bruiser (Note: Japanese: リック・ブルーザー, Hepburn: Rikku Burūzā) is a boxer and brother of Nick Bruiser. Rick has 41 wins on his record and 1 loss from his brother. Both Rick and Nick can use the "Arm Breaker", a special move that temporarily takes Little Mac's left or right arm out of action.
Nick Bruiser	Unknown	Nick Bruiser (Note: Japanese: ニック・ブルーザー, Hepburn: Nikku Burūzā) is the final opponent of the game, and holds a record of 42 wins and 0 losses.

== Introduced in Punch-Out!! (2009) ==
Name	Nationality	Description
Disco Kid	American	Disco Kid (Note: Japanese: ディスコ・キッド, Hepburn: Disuko Kiddo) is a 20-year-old American boxer from Brooklyn, New York. He was voiced by Donny Lucas. Disco Kid is one of only two new characters to appear in the Wii video game Punch-Out!!, which consists of mostly characters from Punch-Out!! for the Nintendo Entertainment System. He was one of the first characters revealed in the Wii Punch-Out!!. He is a modernized version of the character Kid Quick from the first arcade game. He is characterized as flamboyant with a high-pitched voice and an affinity for clubbing. Multiple critics felt that he fit in well with the old cast in Punch-Out!! with the characters returning from previous games, including Craig Harris, Oli Welsh, Ricardo Madeira, and DJPubba. He has also been seen as flamboyant and a stereotype of black Americans by critics such as Kotaku's Michael McWhertor. GamesRadar writer Brett Elston also felt he was stereotypical, citing his appreciation of cars, bass, and clubbing. He believed that these stereotypes were comparatively mild compared to other Punch-Out!! characters, with the exception of Mr. Sandman.
Donkey Kong	DK Islander	Donkey Kong appears as a secret opponent in the game's Title Defense mode. He previously made a cameo in the background of the arcade games Punch-Out!! and Super Punch-Out!! alongside Mario, Luigi and Donkey Kong Jr.

== Merchandise ==
Topps and Nintendo of America made a series of trading cards featuring characters from the Mario, The Legend of Zelda, Double Dragon, and the NES Punch-Out!! series. The Punch-Out!! cards depict Little Mac's various opponents. The cards have scratch-off spots on them, which determine loss or win. As in real boxing, but not in this video game series, a "cow blow" is slang for the highly illegal blow to the kidneys and causes the scratch-off card to be an instant loss.

== Stereotypes ==
Punch-Out!! extensively utilizes racial and ethnic stereotypes, particularly in the opponents faced by the player character. The stereotypes featured in the games are an important facet of Punch-Out!!'s visual and aesthetic identity and have received substantial recognition and criticism.

=== History ===
Graphical advancements in the early-mid 1980s enabled the Punch-Out!! arcade game to display human-like characters with exaggerated features and animation. Writing for Kotaku, journalist Kevin Wong wrote that the 1984 Punch-Out!! "lacks cultural sensitivity, to put it mildly — the characters range from being slightly offensive caricatures to highly offensive caricatures." Notable stereotypical characters in the 1984 arcade game include Glass Joe, a French boxer who is easily defeated in combat, and Pizza Pasta, whose name was described by Wong as "just incredible; a shining testament to just not giving a shit. It's like naming a Chinese boxer Chop Suey Wonton, or a Thai boxer Pad Thai Curry Puffs.

Mike Tyson's Punch-Out!! continued the trend of using characters with "distinct stereotypical exaggerations." The 1987 game is widely recognized as a landmark of racial stereotyping in video games: Brandon Mendelson described the boxer opponents as "a cavalcade of racial and ethnic stereotypes," and Sam Machkovech described them as "a veritable United Nations of stereotypes." Writing for The Escapist, Sumantra Lahiri detailed the Japan-developed NES game's extensive stereotyping:

As you go through the game, you gain an encyclopedic knowledge of ignorant American sentiments: The French are weak and cowardly; the Germans are ultra-militaristic; the Japanese are sneaky and untrustworthy; the Spanish are flamboyant and vain; Samoans are fat and stupid; Indians skin tigers alive and wear turbans; Russians love their vodka; and black people are ruthless and a bit ignorant.

An illustration of Soda Popinski hauling crates of glass bottles in the snow, reflecting stereotypes of Russians.

Of particular note in Mike Tyson's Punch-Out!! is the stereotypical Soviet Russian character Soda Popinski, representing the stereotype of Russians as brutish alcoholics obsessed with vodka. In Soda Popinski's entry for the 2017 publication 100 Greatest Video Game Characters, Rahima Schwenkbeck analyzed the character's Russian tropes within the context of contemporary international relations in tandem with localized pressures faced by Nintendo in their attempts to penetrate the American consumer market. Noting the pervasiveness of unflattering tropes about Soviet or Russian people in popular culture in the West, Schwenkbeck pointed out that this is not a phenomenon unique to American media, citing the historically turbulent Japan–Russia relations and the predominantly negative image of Russia among Japanese society based on the findings of a Pew Research Center survey in 2015. Schwenkbeck observed that Popinski's continued depiction as a caricature of a vodka-loving Russian, regardless of changing political climates and expectations of improved character development with the advancement of technology, reflects a larger narrative about long-standing negative stereotypes of Russians prevalent in both American and Japanese culture.

The 2009 Punch-Out!! game for the Wii heavily uses ethnic and national stereotypes like its predecessors, largely through the use of recycled boxers from previous games. In addition to old stereotypical characters such as Glass Joe and Soda Popinski, the newest Punch-Out!! game also features the stereotypical boxer Disco Kid, portrayed as a Black American preoccupied with music and clubbing.

=== Reception ===
In contrast with Punch-Out's mainstream popularity, critical reception to the series' stereotypes has generally been negative. Davey Nieves and Wong condemned Punch-Out!!'s ethnic and national stereotypes as offensive and mean-spirited. John Speerbrecker described the stereotypes as "much worse" than those featured in Street Fighter II, another popular fighting game whose stereotyping is often compared with that in Punch-Out!!. Machkovech characterized Punch-Out!!'s ethnic and national stereotyping as part of a broader lack of meaningful racial diversity in Nintendo video games and general bias in favor of white characters. Schwenkbeck unfavorably compared Soda Popinski to the Street Fighter character Zangief, calling the former "pure stereotype" while the latter is referred to as a "solid character."

Despite the generally negative reception to Punch-Out!!'s stereotypes, some critics have also expressed more forgiving views of the stereotypical characters. Brett Elston characterized the depictions as "friendly jabs at everyone's equal expense," and Wong argued that "the developers took a 'scorched earth' approach to their stereotyping; every ethnicity was equally lampooned, which pre-empted any accusations of 'singling out' anyone."
