= Glass Joe =

Fictional character in Punch-Out!!

- Punch-Out!! character
- Glass Joe in the 2009 Wii release of Punch-Out!!
- First game: Punch-Out!! (1984)
- Designed by: Shigeru Miyamoto (Punch-Out!!, 1984); Makoto Wada (Punch-Out!!, 1987)
- Voiced by: Christian Bernard (Punch-Out!!, 2009)

Glass Joe (Note: Japanese: グラス・ジョー, Hepburn: Gurasu Jō) is a fictional French boxer from Nintendo's Punch-Out!! video game series. He first appeared in the arcade game Punch-Out!! in 1984 and three years later in the NES game of the same name. His most recent appearance was in the Wii installment of Punch-Out!!. He was originally designed by Shigeru Miyamoto and was revised by Makoto Wada for the NES game. He is voiced by Christian Bernard in the Wii game.

Joe is the player's first opponent in all of his roles. As a foil among most of the boxers, he is famous for his weakness and cowardice, considered by critics to be stereotypes of French people. These characteristics were emphasized by the developer of the Wii game which included cutscenes which depict Glass Joe in French settings. Glass Joe is considered one of the most well-known characters in the Punch-Out!! series and a Nintendo icon. His name has been used to describe poor performance by sportspeople and teams. In the Wii game, his dialogue consists of him pleading for the player to not strike him in the jaw, complaints about the tightness of his gloves, and counting to ten in French.

== Concept and creation ==
Glass Joe is a 38-year-old French flyweight boxer who was born in Paris. He stands at 177.8 centimeters (5'10'') and weighs in at 49.9 kilograms (110 lbs.). His boxing record is one win and 99 losses. He is the weakest opponent and the first meeting with the players in any of their appearances. His mediocrity has been attributed to poor blocking and reaction time. He possesses several stereotypes of French people.

The character was designed by Shigeru Miyamoto for the original Punch-Out!! arcade game. The name "Glass Joe" was conceived by Genyo Takeda as a play on his glass jaw. Glass Joe's appearance was revised by Makoto Wada for the NES Punch-Out!!. The character is voiced by Christian Bernard in the Wii game; much of his dialogue in between matches consists of counting to ten in French. Next Level Games (the developer of the Wii game) introduced cutscenes which depicted Glass Joe as a fashionable Frenchman. They also showed him in front of the Arc de Triomphe and the Eiffel Tower (both Parisian landmarks) The designers had croissants burst from Glass Joe as he is knocked out.

== Appearances ==
Glass Joe's debut was in the first Punch-Out!! game for the arcades in 1984. His role was to give young players a sense of accomplishment which motivated them to spend more money to try to beat the more difficult opponents. Glass Joe later appeared in Punch-Out!! for the NES in 1987. While he did not appear in the SNES game's sequel, he opened a boxing school for potential fighters. Gabby Jay (the game's first opponent) attended this school and got his first and only win against Glass Joe. Glass Joe's most recent appearance was in Punch-Out!! for the Wii in 2009. He was one of the first characters revealed in pre-release material. The Wii Punch-Out!! has a mode called "Title Defense" which featured a more difficult version of Glass Joe among other opponents. This mode has Glass Joe wear a protective headgear out of a doctor's recommendation after an X-ray was done on his skull, causing him to be immune to jabs unless star-punched. A photo of Glass Joe appears in the 2023 film The Super Mario Bros. Movie, in a pizzeria called "Punch-Out Pizza". He was included in a series of trading cards which depict various Punch-Out!! boxers.

== Reception ==
Glass Joe has come to be considered one of Punch-Out!!'s signature characters. Glass Joe is considered noteworthy for his weakness, with writers having used him as a test of the usability of NES controllers such as the U-Force and the Power Glove. His appearance in the "Title Defense" mode of the Wii Punch-Out!! received attention for his increased difficulty. Official Nintendo Magazine's Chris Scullion praised the fight and felt it proved that the Wii game would not be too easy. His name has been used as a derogatory term for sportspeople and teams who perform poorly, including Derek Anderson and the New York Mets. When asked who among his boxing opponents most reminded him of Glass Joe, Mike Tyson said Bruce Seldon whom he claimed he didn't even need to hit. Both UGO's Chris Plante and G4TV's jmanalang considered the fight with Glass Joe one of the most memorable NES moments. Plante felt that it was even more memorable than the in-game fight with Mike Tyson.

Glass Joe's French characteristics and stereotypes have been discussed by critics such as writer Sumantra Lahiri and Eurogamer's Oli Welsh. IGN's Craig Harris felt that the NES game focused more on his weaknesses and that the Wii game emphasized his stereotypes. A member of the Retronauts podcast also felt that he was defined more by his weakness than his nationality until he learned more about French stereotypes. Despite the presence of stereotypes, Giant Bomb's Ryan Davis felt that there was nothing legitimately offensive about how Glass Joe is presented.

== See also ==
- Tomato can
