= StarTropics =

1990 video game

- North American box art
- Developers: Nintendo R&D3; Locomotive Corporation
- Publisher: Nintendo
- Director: Genyo Takeda
- Programmer: Masato Hatakeyama
- Artist: Makoto Wada
- Writer: Genyo Takeda
- Composer: Yoshio Hirai
- Series: StarTropics
- Platform: Nintendo Entertainment System
- Release: NA: December 26, 1990; EU: August 20, 1992
- Genre: Action-adventure
- Mode: Single-player

StarTropics is a 1990 action-adventure video game developed and published by Nintendo for the Nintendo Entertainment System. Unlike most of Nintendo's games, it was never released in Japan, and was released only in North America and Europe. The story follows teenager Mike Jones as he embarks on a quest to rescue his uncle. Gameplay involves exploring settlements and navigating dungeons to progress.

The game was produced, written and directed by Genyo Takeda of Nintendo Integrated Research & Development, who also developed the Punch-Out!! series. StarTropics was followed by a sequel, Zoda's Revenge: StarTropics II, which was released in 1994.

StarTropics was released on the Wii Virtual Console on January 7, 2008, in North America and on January 11, 2008, in the PAL regions; it was released on the Wii U Virtual Console in Europe on September 3, 2015, in Australia on September 4, 2015, and in North America on May 26, 2016. On November 11, 2016, the game was included in the NES Classic Edition. On March 13, 2019, the game was added to the Nintendo Classics library for the Nintendo Switch Online service.

== Gameplay ==
An overhead view of Mike's starting location in StarTropics, C-island, so named due to its resemblance to the letter "C"

StarTropics is played from a 2D, top-down perspective, similar to role-playing games of the time. The game is divided into several chapters; in each chapter, players take control of the protagonist, Mike Jones, exploring various settlements and other areas of interest and interacting with non-player characters to obtain more information. The player is then usually tasked with locating the source of a local calamity or disturbance. In dungeons, the game switches to a closer view and introduces various obstacles and enemies, which the player must either navigate or destroy to progress.

Mike primarily wields a yo-yo, which is renamed "star" in the Virtual Console release. As the player progresses, they unlock more weapons and tools, including several items influenced by American baseball.

The original NES release of the game was packaged with a physical letter, which set up the story and was used in its plot. During gameplay, the player is prompted to dip the letter in water to reveal a hidden code (747), which is required to progress in the game. In response to questions from fans, the code was also published in Nintendo Power. In the Wii Virtual Console release, the letter was added to the electronic manual, which plays an animation of the letter being dipped in water before revealing the code. For the Nintendo Switch release, Nintendo provided the code on their official customer support website.

== Plot ==
Mike Jones, a 15-year-old boy from Seattle and the captain of his high school's baseball team, travels to visit his uncle, archaeologist Dr. Steven Jones, at his laboratory on C-Island in the South Seas. When Mike arrives at Jones's home in the tropical village of Coralcola, he finds that he has disappeared. The chief of Coralcola gives Mike a yo-yo to defend himself, and Jones's robot Nav-Com permits Mike to use his submarine to search for him. On a nearby island, Mike finds a bottle with a message from Jones, stating that aliens have abducted him. While fighting monsters and traveling across the isles of the South Seas in search of Jones, Mike encounters various characters, including a parrot and a mother dolphin looking for her son.

Eventually, a whale swallows Mike and the submarine; in its belly, Mike encounters Jones's assistant, who confirms that aliens abducted him and that out of fear, he did not give Mike all possible help when they met earlier. After escaping the whale, the assistant gives Mike a special code, enabling Nav-Com to track Jones's location. Mike follows the signal to ruins which contain the wreckage of an alien escape pod. Shortly after, Mike finds Jones, who explains that he discovered the escape pod some time ago, which came from the faraway planet of Argonia. The pod contained three magic cubes, which are now in the possession of the aliens' leader, Zoda.

After infiltrating their spaceship, Mike recovers the three cubes and confronts and defeats Zoda, then escapes as the spaceship self-destructs. After Mike returns to C-Island, the cubes are placed together and a group of children appear. Their leader, Mica, explains that they are the last of the Argonians, as Argonia was destroyed, and that her father, King Hirocon, sent them to Earth to live in peace. The village chief invites the children to live with them in Coralcola, which they accept.

== Reception ==
Reception

Aggregate score
Aggregator	Score
GameRankings	(NES) 82.50%

Review scores
Publication	Score
AllGame	(NES) 4.5/5
Electronic Gaming Monthly	(NES) 19/40
Eurogamer	(Wii) 5/10
HobbyConsolas	(NES) 73/100
IGN	(Wii) 8.5/10
Nintendo Life	(Wii) 8/10
Nintendo Power	(NES) 15.7/20
Superjuegos	(NES) 90/100
Total!	(NES) 2+
Video Games (DE)	(NES) 75%
Nintendojo	(NES) 8.9/10
Play Time	(NES) 71%

Award
Publication	Award
Nintendo Power (1997)	#64 100 Best Games of All Time

In a 1991 review, the Green Bay Press-Gazette praised the game's graphics and sound, but considered it too similar to The Legend of Zelda and deemed the gameplay "dreadful."

AllGame's Christopher Michael Baker also found the game to be derivative of The Legend of Zelda, but still "very much an excellent game". Michael Baker commented on the graphics, noting that the characters and action sequences "look fantastic" while the travel scenes were "kind of dull". IGN's Lucas M. Thomas praised the creative gameplay of StarTropics, calling it "the natural evolution of the original Legend of Zelda."

In the September 1997 issue, Nintendo Power had 12 staff members vote in a list for the top 100 games of all time. The magazine placed StarTropics at 64th place on their list. IGN ranked it #35 on its "Top 100 NES Games" list.
