= Little Mac =

Main character of the Punch-Out!! video game series

- Punch-Out!! character
- Little Mac, as depicted in Punch-Out!! for Wii
- First appearance: Punch-Out!! (1984) (Note: Unnamed boxer)
- First game: Punch-Out!! (1987)
- Created by: Genyo Takeda
- Designed by: Makoto Wada
- Voiced by: Various: Charles Martinet (Super Punch-Out!!); Matt Harty (Punch-Out!! (Wii)); Hisao Egawa (Super Smash Bros. Brawl); Matthew Senreich (2014 Nintendo Digital Event segments; Kōsuke Toriumi (Super Smash Bros. for Nintendo 3DS and Wii U and Super Smash Bros. Ultimate)

In-universe information
- Origin: The Bronx, New York
- Nationality: American

Little Mac (Note: Japanese: リトル・マック, Hepburn: Ritoru Makku) is a character and the protagonist in Nintendo's Punch-Out!! series of video games. He first appeared as a nameless boxer in the Arcade game Punch-Out!!, then was given a name and redesigned in the NES game of the same name. He is the smallest and youngest of all the boxers in the games, being only 17 years old across all Punch-Out!! games. His signature attack is the "STAR Punch". His design was changed again for the SNES Super Punch-Out!!, but reverted to his NES appearance in the Wii title, which was then used in the Super Smash Bros. series. In the NES and Wii games, Little Mac is accompanied by Doc Louis, his trainer.

In addition to his own series, Little Mac has made multiple cameo appearances in and out of video games; video games include Captain Rainbow, Fight Night Round 2 and the Super Smash Bros. series, while he appeared in a variety of comic books, including those created by Valiant Comics. Little Mac has received positive reception since his debut and has been regarded as one of the best protagonists in video games by multiple publications.

== Concept and creation ==
Since his appearance in Punch-Out!! for the NES, Little Mac has been represented with black hair; he usually wears a black tank top, green shorts, and green boxing gloves, though Super Punch-Out!! depicts him with blonde hair and blue pants. In the NES and Wii titles, he is shown sporting a pink jumpsuit whenever he and Doc Louis train in between circuits. He was originally going to be named Peter Punch, but this was changed before the game's debut. He is smaller than other opponents, able to perform various techniques, including the Star Uppercut, used by either collecting stars or filling a meter. Mac has a stamina meter where he becomes unable to fight for a time until he recovers.

The identity of the player character in Super Punch-Out!! is the source of contention, with multiple sources disagreeing on whether he is Little Mac. According to Nintendo of America, the SNES title takes place after the events of the NES and Wii titles of the series; Little Mac looks different because he was given a makeover, and his repertoire has expanded since separating from Doc Louis. Before the SNES Super Punch-Out!! was finished and released, some screenshots and video footage of the prototype seen in gaming magazines showed him with a different look compared to his final version seen in the finished and released version.

He was voiced in Punch-Out!! for Wii by Matt Harty, a sound designer for Next Level Games. Unlike his opponents, his design in Punch-Out!! for Wii has not changed much. They specifically kept him a silent protagonist due to how similar the Wii game is to the NES game as well as the tradition of silent Nintendo protagonists such as Kirby, Link, and Ness. The designers also wanted Mac to be an avatar for the player. They were originally going to allow players to upgrade Little Mac's abilities; however, they felt that it would take away from the challenge of overcoming opponents, as well as diminish peoples' interests in Little Mac.

== Appearances ==
Little Mac first appeared in the arcade video game Punch-Out!! as an unnamed boxer. He would later get his name in the NES game Mike Tyson's Punch Out!!, the third game in the series and his third appearance. He has appeared as the main protagonist in every Punch-Out!! game since. His next appearance was in Super Punch-Out!! for the Super NES, which gave him a drastically different design. Most recently in his series, he appeared in the Wii video game Punch-Out!!. The Wii game adds a multi-player mode, where a second player can take control of an alternate Mac. In this mode, either player can transform into Giga Mac, a larger and more powerful version of Mac. Giga Mac's name was planned to be "Big Mac" in keeping with the "little" in Little Mac's name, but this was changed to avoid comparison to McDonald's Big Mac.

Little Mac has made multiple cameo appearances. His first was in the GameCube version of Fight Night Round 2, where his SNES incarnation is featured as a playable character alongside the ability to play the entire SNES game. He appeared in the Wii video game Captain Rainbow, which featured a variety of obscure Nintendo characters, as an "overweight has-been". Mac also appeared as an Assist Trophy in Super Smash Bros. Brawl, assisting players who summoned him. Little Mac joined the playable roster in Super Smash Bros. for Nintendo 3DS and Wii U, where he is a fighter who is fast and strong on the ground, but is substantially weaker in the air. A mechanic unique to Little Mac is the Power Meter, drawn from the arcade titles, which builds as Mac deals and receives damage. When the meter is full, Mac gains access to the K.O. Uppercut. Little Mac makes a return appearance in Super Smash Bros. Ultimate.

Little Mac is also featured as the protagonist in the Punch-Out!! stories featured in Valiant Comics' Nintendo Comics System. He appears in the stories "The First Fight", "Outsiders", and "Fox and Hounds." Mac also makes a cameo in the prologue short of the Captain N comic books.

Little Mac has made cameos in Illumination's Super Mario movies. In The Super Mario Bros. Movie, he and other Punch Out!! boxers appear on pictures seen on the wall of a Brooklyn restaurant called "Punch-Out Pizzeria." In The Super Mario Galaxy Movie, he and Doc Louis are shown training during the montage where Yoshi explores New York.

== Promotion and reception ==
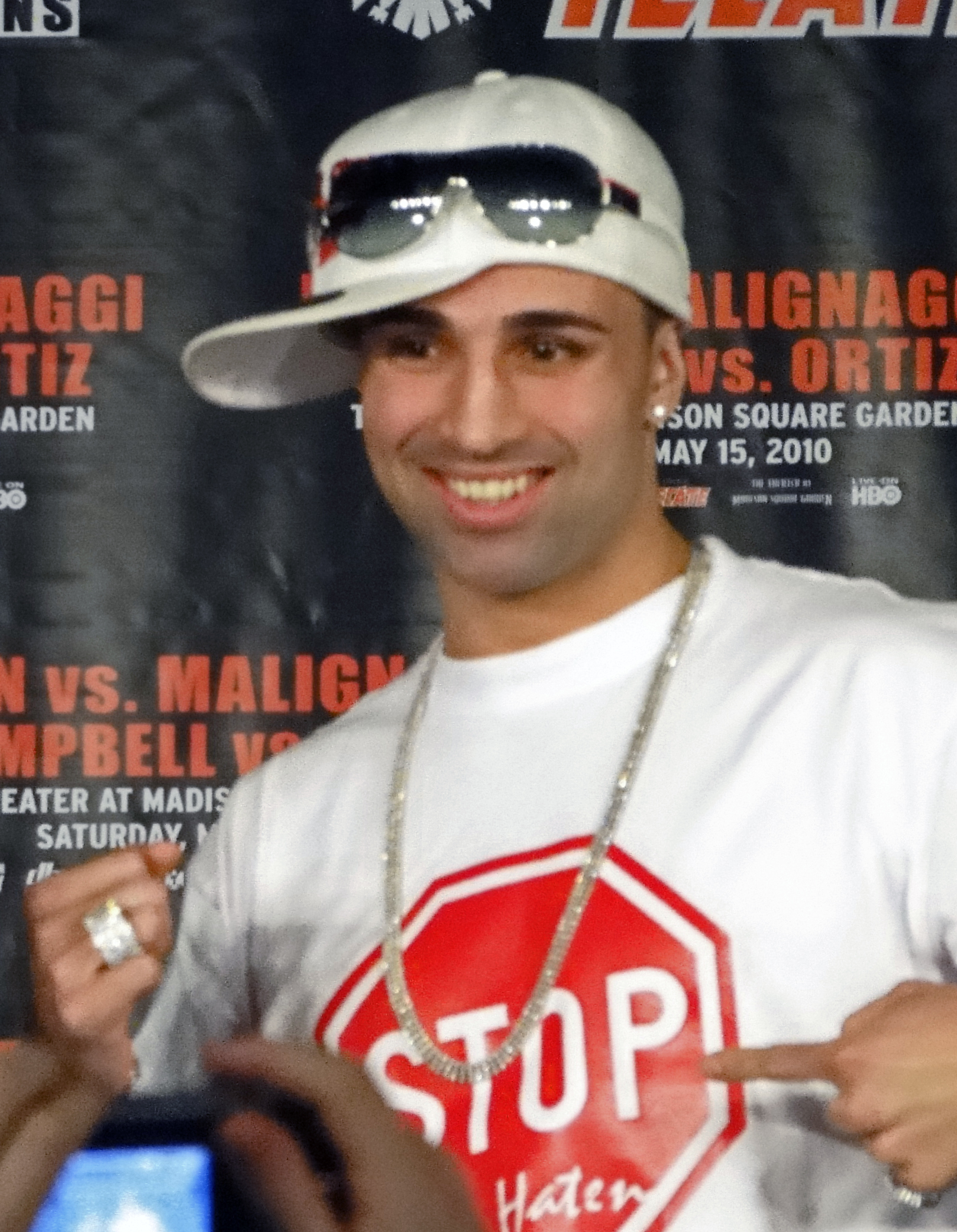
Boxer Paulie Malignaggi portrayed Little Mac in an American commercial for the Wii version of Punch-Out!!

In 2009, he was portrayed by former professional boxer Paulie Malignaggi in an American commercial for Punch-Out!! on the Wii. In an interview, Malignaggi commented that he was asked to play a "young Italian-American guy, good looking with a cocky attitude and a heavy New York accent".

Since his appearance in the Punch-Out!! series, Little Mac has received generally positive reception, and is regarded as a major Nintendo character. GameSpot featured him in a user poll as part of the "all time greatest video game hero" contest. Nintendo Power listed Little Mac as their 11th favorite hero, stating that he taught gamers that more intimidating foes can be overcome by patience, persistence, and "pattern recognition". GamesRadar listed him as the 68th greatest video game hero, and called him the "definition of an underdog hero", due to fighting much larger opponents than himself. GamesRadar's Mikel Reparaz listed Mac's Star Uppercut as one of the most satisfying uppercuts in video games.

However, Little Mac has also received criticism. Both his updated design and Doc Louis' absence were listed by NintendoWorldReport's Neal Ronaghan as weak points of Super Punch-Out!! In their list of the top five racist video games, 1UP.com listed the Punch-Out!! franchise, and referred to Little Mac as the "Great White Hope" relative to the stereotypical character designs of his opponents. The Escapist's Sumantra Lahiri wrote that Little Mac was the only boxer in the game who did not have a "negative stereotype associated with him".

After being a long-time requested inclusion within the Super Smash Bros. series, Little Mac made his debut in the series in Super Smash Bros. Brawl as an "Assist Trophy", a non-playable character that assists the fighter who summoned them. The series' subsequent installments, Super Smash Bros. for Nintendo 3DS and Wii U, transitioned Mac into a full-fledged playable character. In addition to using his updated design from the Wii version of Punch-Out!!, his Giga Mac transformation from that same game is also featured as his "Final Smash", a one-use special move that can only be activated upon breaking a "Smash Ball". Little Mac also appears as a playable character in Super Smash Bros. Ultimate, although his Final Smash has been modified like other transformation-esque Final Smashes. Little Mac's reputation as an underdog has also made its way into the Smash fanbase, as his moveset in Super Smash Bros. Ultimate has been met with harsh criticism as he is one of the easiest characters to defeat once off stage, but maintains one of the best ground games in the entire series, leaving fans polarized about his playstyle. Prior to his inclusion in the Super Smash Bros. series, Gamasutra's Kyle Orland commented that Little Mac's absence from it was "mind-boggling". The qualities listed included his popularity, fighting ability, and "retro cred"; Orland felt that it did not make sense to feature characters such as the Ice Climbers and Mr. Game & Watch instead of Mac. IGN's Lucas M. Thomas and Matt Casamassina expressed disappointment that Little Mac was not playable in Brawl, and suggested that perhaps series creator Masahiro Sakurai could not think of a good moveset for him. Jeremy Parish of Polygon ranked 73 fighters from Super Smash Bros. Ultimate "from garbage to glorious", listing Little Mac as 37th.

Little Mac has also been featured in a number of merchandise items and collectibles. As part of a "boxing challenge" held by Nintendo at its Nintendo World store in Rockefeller Plaza, Nintendo awarded, in part, a training sweatshirt similar to Little Mac's. Nintendo also released a pair of Little Mac-signed green boxing gloves on Amazon.com, which were contained in a wood frame and casing. The band Game Over created a song called "Little Mac's Confession", which follows Little Mac's "crushing KO" against Mr. Dream.
