= Punch-Out!! (1984 video game) =

Boxing arcade video game

- North American arcade flyer
- Developer: Nintendo R&D3
- Publisher: Nintendo
- Producer: Genyo Takeda
- Designer: Genyo Takeda
- Artist: Shigeru Miyamoto
- Composer: Koji Kondo
- Series: Punch-Out!!
- Platforms: Arcade, Nintendo Switch
- Release: February 17, 1984: Arcade; JP: February 17, 1984; NA: March 1984; EU: July 1984; Nintendo Switch; WW: March 30, 2018
- Genre: Sports (boxing)
- Mode: Single-player

Punch-Out!! (Note: Japanese: パンチアウト!!, Hepburn: Panchi-Auto!!) is a 1984 boxing video game developed and published by Nintendo for arcades. It is the first installment of the Punch-Out!! series. It introduced recurring characters such as Glass Joe, Bald Bull and Mr. Sandman. It was also the debut project at Nintendo for composer Koji Kondo, better known for his later contributions to the Mario and The Legend of Zelda series.

The original arcade game was a global commercial success, becoming the top-performing arcade game of 1984 in the United States. It produced an arcade sequel known as Super Punch-Out!!, a spinoff of the series titled Arm Wrestling, a highly popular version for the NES originally known as Mike Tyson's Punch Out!!, and Super Punch-Out!! for the SNES.

== Gameplay ==
The first match against Glass Joe

In the game, the player takes the role of a green-haired unnamed boxer (referred to in-game as 'challenger', but sometimes claimed to be Little Mac from the NES versions), known by three initials the player chooses when the game begins. During matches, the player's boxer is viewed from behind and above as a wireframe so the opponent can be seen. The player must time his punches, dodges and blocks in order to defeat the opposing boxer. Opponents' impending offensive moves are telegraphed by subtle eye changes (the whites of the eyes flash yellow), but the player must ultimately predict what moves the opponent will make and react appropriately.

Once the player defeats the last opponent, the opponents repeat with increased difficulty. The player has one 3-minute round to score a knockout and will automatically lose if time runs out. A fighter who is knocked down three times in one round will be unable to rise, leading to a knockout. In the event the player loses, the computer-controlled victor will taunt the player and the corner man for the player will try to entice the player to play again ("Come on, Get up and fight!") via the game's distinctive digitized speech. Players are only allowed one continue per play through. Like many games made during the Golden Age of Arcade Games, there is no actual ending and the game continuously loops until the player loses.

The game is a modified upright, and was unusual in that it requires two video monitors, one atop the other, for the game's display. The top monitor is used to display statistics and fighter portraits, while the bottom one is the main game display (similar to Nintendo's Multi-Screen Game & Watch titles and the Nintendo DS) with the gameplay and power meters (representing stamina) for each fighter. Apart from this, the game is more or less a standard upright. The game has a joystick and three buttons. Two buttons control left and right punches, one for each arm (denoted by "Left!", or "Right!" when hitting the head, or "body blow!" when hitting the body with either arm). The third, larger button allows the player to deliver a powerful uppercut or right hook, but only when the "KO meter" on the top of the bottom display is completely full. The meter increases when the player successfully lands a punch, decreases when the opponent lands one, and drops to zero when the player is knocked down. Once the meter is full, the corner man's digitized speech encourages the player to either "Put him away!" or "Knock him out!" The joystick can be used to raise/lower the player's guard and dodge left or right.

== Development and release ==
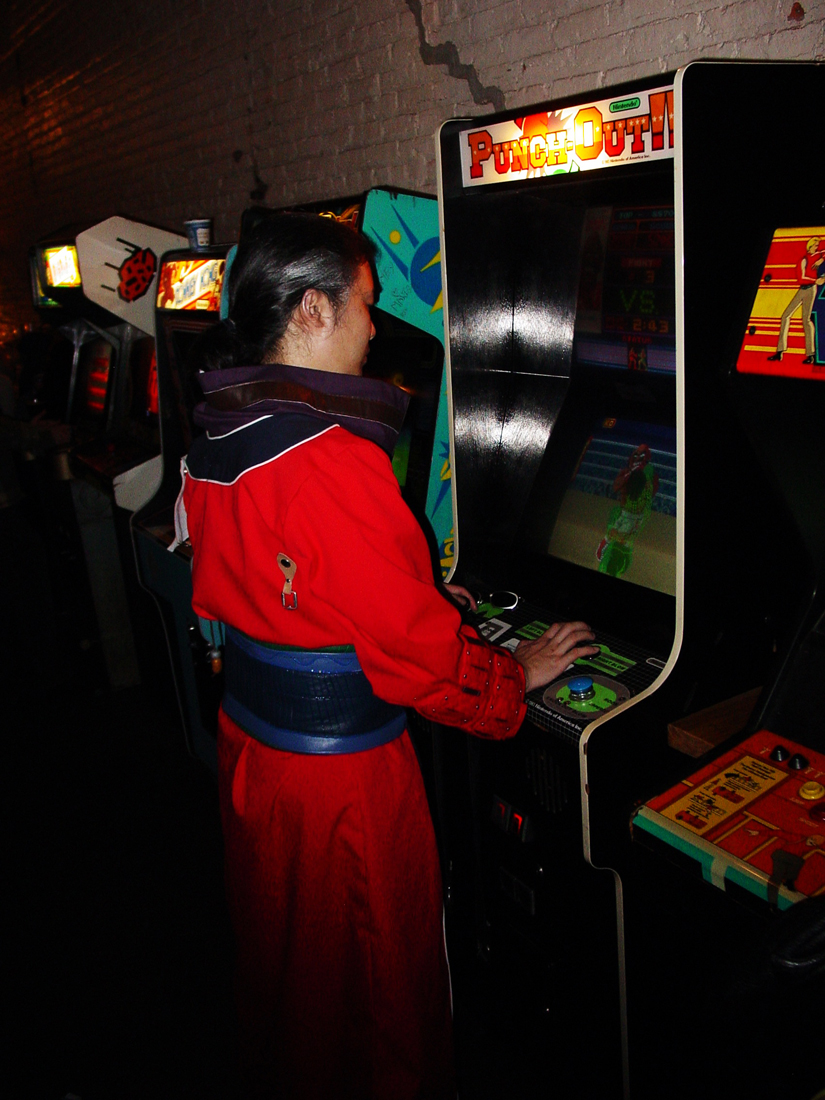
An arcade patron playing the arcade version of Punch-Out!! at Barcade in Brooklyn, New York

The game was developed in 1983 and released in February 1984. Genyo Takeda from the Integrated Research & Development Division was the lead developer, and Shigeru Miyamoto designed the characters. It was released in the first quarter of 1984, when Nintendo was making several coin-operated arcade machines. Nintendo had an excessive number of video monitors after the success of the Donkey Kong series, basing the purchases on the estimate for the demand for arcade games. They were offered a proposition to make an arcade game that used two monitors. They chose to make a boxing game, which utilized the ability to zoom in and out of an object. This was a feature more commonly found in games that involve flying such as flight simulators, but the developers chose boxing because they thought it would be a different way to use it.

Miyamoto and Takeda discussed an earlier arcade game created by Takeda: EVR RACE, a horse racing game from 1975, which used a video tape. It was a mechanical game, and was hard to maintain after it was released and had many breakdowns. While they were developing Punch-Out!!, laserdisc-based games were considered to be the next major advancement in the arcade industry. However, the maintenance requirement would be very large if they released laserdisc-based games worldwide. Despite this, domestic sales people wanted something like laserdisc, so they tried to find if it could be done with semiconductors. Miyamoto explained that that's why they were interested in microchips that could perform zooming and show pictures at a similar size as a laserdisc. However, he called it a "rascal of a project", explaining that when he made Donkey Kong, he had to animate each rolling barrel pixel by pixel. When he asked if they could use processing on the hardware side to rotate the image, they said "it's not impossible", changing from "it can't be done."

He stated that a lot of new things were being created, but most of it was still under development. They told Miyamoto that they could zoom in or rotate the image, but not both at once. They were planning on using the new microchips as well as the two monitors, considering lining them up side by side and making a big racing game, but it was not powerful enough to accomplish this, only able to expand one of the images. Takeda stated that if they could only expand one image, it could be a person. This eventually allowed it to become a boxing game, with one opponent, deciding that one monitor was good enough for a boxing game. They were stuck at that point, but thought that a boxing arena has big lights and banners hanging from the ceiling with things like "World Heavyweight Title Match" written on them. The game would also feature several meters, so they thought it would be more fun to have two screens instead of one.

Mario, Luigi, Donkey Kong and Donkey Kong Jr. all appear in the audience. The game's title music, also heard in the arcade version of Super Punch-Out!! and the NES version of Punch-Out!!, is actually the "Gillette Look Sharp March". This jingle, originally heard in Gillette radio and television commercials in the 1950s, was later used as the theme song to the Gillette Cavalcade of Sports, which aired boxing matches.

== Reception ==
The arcade game was a hit in all regions for Nintendo. In Japan, Game Machine listed Punch-Out!! on their April 15, 1984 issue as being the second top-grossing upright/cockpit arcade cabinet of the month.

In North America, Punch-Out took the arcade market by storm according to Play Meter magazine in 1984, capitalizing on the success of sports video games following Track & Field (1983). It was one of the more successful arcade games during the post-boom period of the mid-1980s. Punch-Out topped the US arcade charts during 1984, including the RePlay charts in July (upright cabinets) and December, and the Play Meter charts for dedicated arcade cabinets from August 1 through November 15. Punch-Out went on to become the top-performing arcade game of 1984 in the United States.

The arcade game was reviewed in the August 1984 issue of Computer and Video Games, published in July 1984. The magazine gave the game a positive review, describing it as a "knock-out" and a "fabulous boxing game". The review also praised the graphics as being "great" and "cartoon-style" and concluded that it is "a very addictive game which is great fun to play."

Punch-Out!! was later marked in the Killer List of Videogames Top 100, as one of their top 100 best games of all time. They also listed it as the Game of the Year for the year 1984. In 1995, Flux magazine rated Punch-Out!! 21st in its "Top 100 Video Games." In 1996, GamesMaster ranked the game 83rd on their "Top 100 Games of All Time."

== Legacy ==
In Super Smash Bros. for Nintendo 3DS and Wii U and Super Smash Bros. Ultimate, series protagonist Little Mac appears as a playable fighter. The character features a set of wireframe alternate costumes based on his appearance from the original arcade games. Little Mac also features a special mechanic based on the KO gauge from the arcade titles, which, once full, can usually let him instantly KO an opponent with a powerful uppercut.

=== Re-releases, sequels, and spin-offs ===
During the same year, an arcade sequel to Punch-Out!! titled Super Punch-Out!! was developed and released by Nintendo, which has fewer, but tougher boxers to fight against.

In 1985, a spin-off called Arm Wrestling was developed and released in the arcades only in North America by the same company, which is based on real arm wrestling.

In 1987, the growing popularity of the Nintendo Entertainment System (NES) caused the development and release of Punch-Out!! for the console to happen. Several elements, such as opponents and their names, were changed for this version. In particular, professional boxer Mike Tyson was added as the game's final boss. In 1990, when the contract licensing the use of Tyson's name in the console version expired, Nintendo replaced Tyson with an original character named Mr. Dream, re-releasing it as Punch-Out!! (or Punch-Out!! featuring Mr. Dream). Like Mike Tyson's Punch-Out!!, Punch-Out!! featuring Mr. Dream bore no further resemblance to the arcade version.

During its release, the Game & Watch game called Boxing was re-released as Punch-Out!!, which used the front box art of the Mr. Dream version as its package art. Sometimes it was released with different cover art.

A Super Nintendo Entertainment System sequel, Super Punch-Out!! was released in 1994. It was far more faithful to the arcade stand-up gameplay; however, it was not a direct port either.

A Wii title, Punch-Out!! was released in 2009. It is a reboot of the Punch-Out!! series, that brought back many characters from the previous games, as well as introducing Disco Kid and Donkey Kong as opponents.

The game was released on March 30, 2018 on the Nintendo Switch by Hamster Corporation as part of their Arcade Archives series under license from Nintendo.
