= King Hippo =

- Punch-Out!! character
- King Hippo in Punch-Out!! (Wii)
- First game: Punch-Out!! (1987)
- Created by: Genyo Takeda
- Designed by: Makoto Wada
- Voiced by: Garry Chalk (Captain N); Scott McFadyen (Wii)

King Hippo (Note: Japanese: キング・ヒッポー, Hepburn: Kingu Hippō) is a fictional boxer from Nintendo's Punch-Out!! series. He first appeared on the Nintendo Entertainment System game Mike Tyson's Punch-Out!!, as the second competitor in the Major Circuit. Subsequent reviews have characterized him as one of the most iconic characters from the game, because he was a complicated boss to defeat. In Punch-Out!! (Wii), he returns, having a second fight where he uses a manhole to protect his weak point.

King Hippo is featured prominently on the NBC Saturday morning cartoon, Captain N: The Game Master, where he was portrayed by Garry Chalk. His obese figure and his face both resemble those of a hippopotamus.

== Concept and creation ==
King Hippo was originally created by Punch-Out!! character designer Makoto Wada and engineer Genyo Takeda. Takeda gave King Hippo his name with the American market in mind. He is typically depicted wearing a crown, with a face and girth resembling a hippopotamus', hailing from Hippo Island. His fighting style consists of jabs where he blocks his mouth, and strikes where he reveals his mouth. If punched in the face, he drops his shorts, revealing his weak spot on his belly. Once he goes down, he stays down until the referee counts to 10. The Wii sequel features a second mode where King Hippo has duct-taped a manhole cover over his stomach to protect himself; the player must knock it loose in order to attack that weak point.

When developing the roster for the Wii sequel, the developers wanted to use King Hippo and others from the NES game was due to developer Next Level Games wanting to primarily focus on this roster. They also both wanted to ensure that they had a diversity of nationalities. The staff was expected by producer Kensuke Tanabe to make the cast, King Hippo included, appeal to both new and old gamers alike, designing him in such a way as to make him resemble how King Hippo looked and played in the NES game. They still wanted to ensure they could "make fun" of the characters' ethnicities and traits, but also cast the characters with people matching the characters' ethnicities that they drew upon, casting Scott McFadyen.

== Appearances ==
King Hippo first appeared in the 1987 NES video game Mike Tyson's Punch-Out!! as one of its opponents, before returning in the 2009 Wii video game Punch-Out, where his design and fighting style intentionally resemble the NES incarnation. Some advertisements for the Wii game feature the protagonist Little Mac training to reclaim the World Circuit Title from King Hippo. A scrapped commercial for Punch-Out!! on Wii depicted King Hippo showing off his home in an "MTV Cribs-like tour" in a place called Strong Island. Promotional merchandise was created for the Wii Punch-Out!!, which included replicas of King Hippo's crown and boxing shorts, as well as a King Hippo desktop punching bag. King Hippo has appeared multiple times in the Super Smash Bros. series, including as a collectible trophy in Super Smash Bros. for Wii U and spirit in Super Smash Bros. Ultimate.

King Hippo has a major role in the animated series Captain N: The Game Master as one of Mother Brain's henchmen. He has blue skin and is often paired in with the Kid Icarus villain Eggplant Wizard. In this role, he was portrayed by Garry Chalk, who identified it as one of his favorite voice acting experiences.

King Hippo makes a cameo appearance in the Scott Pilgrim & the Infinite Sadness comic book, as part of a guest comic written and illustrated by Girly creator Jackie Lesnick.

== Reception ==
Since appearing in the NES video game Punch-Out!!, King Hippo has received generally positive reception. GameDaily regarded him as one of the best Nintendo characters, noting that he stood out more than the other characters in the game, a sentiment shared by GamesRadar writer Chris Antista and Wired staff. He was also regarded as one of the best video game villains by IGN. His role in Captain N was also recognized as one of the reasons for his popularity by IGN writer Lucas M. Thomas. His appearance was praised, including by Destructoid's Colette Bennett, who called him distinct and well-designed. Kotaku writer Kevin Wong, regarding him as one of his favorite boxers in the series, praised his design as "completely unique" and a "stroke of brilliance" by Nintendo. Game Informer staff felt that the secret to defeating King Hippo was likely more well-known than the 30-life code in the video game Contra. Colette Bennett echoed this sentiment, feeling that it was a weak point that anyone could identify. 1UP.com editor Bob Mackey called the fight with him an "iconic moment in gaming" and one that was the "talk of the schoolyards during the 80's". Kevin Wong noted that the tension of having to counterattack King Hippo was an aspect of what made him one of the best opponents in the series.

King Hippo had been criticized for being a racial stereotype. The Retronauts podcast discussed how he was a stereotype of Pacific islanders, pointing to King Hippo being fat and lavish as examples of these stereotypes. Brian Shirk, writing in Bit Mob, criticized King Hippo's design as offensive, suggesting that his "subhuman caricature" design was likely based on the savage portrayal of Polynesians in media.
