= Super Punch-Out!! (1984 video game) =

Boxing arcade video game

- North American arcade flyer
- Developer: Nintendo R&D3
- Publisher: Nintendo
- Producer: Genyo Takeda
- Artists: Shigeru Miyamoto; Takashi Tezuka
- Series: Punch-Out!!
- Platform: Arcade
- Release: JP: September 1984; NA: October 1984
- Genres: Sports (boxing)
- Mode: Single-player

Super Punch-Out!! (Note: Japanese: スーパーパンチアウト！！, Hepburn: Sūpā Panchi-Auto!!) is a 1984 boxing video game developed and published by Nintendo for arcades. It is the sequel to Punch-Out!! (1984), and follows the same format while adding several new features and characters. Along with punching, blocking and dodging, players also have the ability to duck. The game also saves and displays the three fastest knockout times, while the game's difficulty is increased.

It introduces a number of new characters to the Punch-Out!! series, including Bear Hugger, Dragon Chan, Vodka Drunkenski (whose name was changed to Soda Popinski in later releases), Great Tiger, and Super Macho Man. Several of the new fighters use illegal moves from wrestling or martial arts.

== Gameplay ==
The final match against Super Macho Man

As in the original Punch-Out!!, the player assumes the role of a green-haired boxer (later recast as Little Mac in the 1987 Nintendo Entertainment System version), known by three initials, who works through the ranks of the WVBA (World Video Boxing Association). During matches, the player's boxer is viewed from the rear as a wireframe so the opponents are visible to the player. The player must precisely time punches, dodges, and blocks in order to defeat the opposing boxer. Hints are given as to the opponent's next move by subtle eye changes, but the player must ultimately predict what moves the opponent will make and react appropriately. Mostly, the opponent's eyes turn yellow before attacking, as well as winding up. Like in the previous arcade game, if the player loses, the opponent will glide up and laugh, with their stun animation and their neutral animation being reused.

Once the player defeats the final opponent, the player will win the Heavyweight Belt, then defend it against the same characters that have already been beaten. Each successive time they are met, the opponents are harder and quicker. In order to win a bout, the player must knock out the opponent within one 3-minute round; failure to do so results in an automatic loss. A technical knockout is awarded if either fighter is knocked down three times, but the opponent will sometimes fail to rise after the first or second knockdown.

The arcade game is housed in a modified upright cabinet. Like the previous game, it requires two vertically stacked monitors. The top monitor is used to display statistics while the bottom one is the main game display. It is otherwise a standard upright arcade cabinet. It has a joystick and three buttons. Two buttons control left and right punches, one for each arm. One button delivers a strong uppercut or right hook, but it only works when the super meter (also known as the KO meter or power meter) is full. The super meter (an early version of the super meter used in modern fighting games) is filled by landing successful punches. It is drained when the player fails to block or dodge an attack, or if the player is knocked down. The joystick can be used to raise/lower the player's guard and dodge left or right. Unlike the original game, however, Super Punch-Out!! allows the player to pull the joystick straight up from the panel as well, with the effect of ducking under a punch.

== Development ==
The game was developed by Nintendo R&D3, with development led by Genyo Takeda. Shigeru Miyamoto, due to his increasing responsibilities with the Famicom, had a smaller role for the sequel, aiding artists with their concept images. Takeda held brainstorming sessions with R&D3 on how to improve on Punch-Out, but initially had difficulties coming up with ideas within the rules of boxing. Takeda said they "did everything we could do with boxing," so the "only thing we could do was to include illegal moves, and that's why we made it so anything goes and had characters who would kick or were like martial artists, and that became Super Punch-Out!!"

== Reception ==
In Japan, Game Machine listed Super Punch-Out!! on their November 15, 1984 issue as being the third most-successful upright arcade unit of the month.

In the United States, the U.S. National Video Game Team selected Super Punch-Out as the best game at the AMOA Expo show in October 1984, and as one of the six games to be played in the 1985 national video games competition. Team member Phil Britt said the "inclusion of world records and the increased difficulty make it more" playable.

Reviewing the Arcade Archives re-release, Chris Scullion of Nintendo Life gave the game a 7/10 score, praising its visuals and improved game design, though he criticized the game's lack of content.

== Other releases ==
=== Frank Bruno's Boxing ===
Reception

Review scores
Publication	Score
Crash	86%
Computer and Video Games	37/40
Sinclair User	4/5
Computer Gamer	14/20
Popular Computing Weekly	4/5
Your Spectrum	4/5
ZX Computing	3/5

An unlicensed version of Super Punch-Out!! was released in 1985 for the Commodore 64, the ZX Spectrum, the Amstrad CPC, and in 1986 for the Commodore 16 and Commodore Plus/4 titled Frank Bruno's Boxing. It was developed and published by Elite Systems exclusively in Europe. Instead of the nameable wireframe boxer, real-life boxer Frank Bruno stars as the protagonist of the game. Only the first three opponents of the original game: Bear Hugger, Dragon Chan, and Vodka Drunkenski, were retained, albeit with their names changed to "Canadian Crusher", "Fling-Long Chop", and "Andra Puncheredov" respectively. The rest of the original game's cast were replaced with five newly-created boxers, each representing stereotypical versions of various parts of the world: Tribal Trouble (Africa), Frenchie France (France), Raviolo Mafiosi (Italy), Antipodean Andy (Australia), and Peter Perfect (USA) - a repurposed version of the original game's player character. Frank Bruno's Boxing also retains the KO meter mechanic, allowing a more powerful punch to be thrown when the bar is filled.

Frank Bruno's Boxing was the sixth best-selling home video game of 1985 in the United Kingdom. Elite Systems later re-released the game as Frank Bruno's World Championship Boxing on their Encore budget label to coincide with the Mike Tyson vs. Frank Bruno bout of 1989.

=== Others ===
Great Tiger, Super Macho Man, and Vodka Drunkenski appear in the 1987 Nintendo Entertainment System version of Punch-Out!!. Vodka Drunkenski was renamed "Soda Popinski" in order to eliminate alcohol references in a family-oriented game.

The Super Punch-Out!! arcade inspired the development and release of Super Punch-Out!! for the Super Nintendo Entertainment System console in 1994. Several elements were slightly changed for this version. Characters from both Punch Out!! arcade games are featured in the game with basically the same looks and attacks. including Bear Hugger, Dragon Chan, and Super Macho Man.

As in the original Punch-Out!! arcade, Mario, Luigi, Donkey Kong, and Donkey Kong Junior all appear in the audience part of the Super Punch-Out!! arcade. Also, one of the victory tunes heard in the Super Punch-Out!! arcade was later used in Nintendo's 1985 Baseball for the NES as the home run theme.

Hamster Corporation released the game as part of their Arcade Archives series for the Nintendo Switch on August 14, 2020.
