= Tomato can =

Opponent considered an "easy win"

A tomato can, or simply can, is a fighter in individual combat sports with comparatively poor or diminished skills who may be considered an easy opponent to defeat, or a "guaranteed win." Fights with tomato cans can be arranged to inflate the win total of a professional fighter. Similarly, a fighter whose record consists of wins over easy opponents is referred to as a "can crusher". The phrase originates in the childhood pastime of kicking a can down the street—a boxer is advancing his career with minimal effort by defeating a tomato can and notching a win. "Tomato" refers to blood: "knock a tomato can over, and red stuff spills out."

== Characteristics ==
A tomato can is usually a fighter with a poor record, whose skills are substandard or who lacks toughness or has a glass jaw. Sometimes a formerly successful boxer who is past his prime and who has seen his skills diminish is considered a tomato can if he can no longer compete at a high level. Such an individual is an attractive opponent if his name still carries prestige but his diminished skills make him an easy conquest. When referring to a distinguished fighter, opponents with passable careers who simply are not at the same level can also be considered tomato cans. Most fighters who are considered tomato cans are heavyweights, because at lower weight classes one must maintain a certain level of fitness in order to make weight, whereas a heavyweight who once fought at a trim 205 pounds could conceivably gain 150 pounds and still fight in the same division.

One characteristic which may account for the use of the "tomato can" metaphor for a bad boxer is the tendency to leak "tomato juice" (i.e., blood) when battered.

Tomato cans are similar to jobbers in professional wrestling in that they serve to enhance the stature of someone the promotion uses to draw a crowd.

== Surprises and upsets ==
Victory over a tomato can is not a certainty. Journeyman boxers generally regarded as tomato cans have been known to provide surprising challenges to champions and in several instances, cause shocking upsets against supposedly superior opponents.

On March 24, 1975, Muhammad Ali faced Chuck Wepner, a lightly regarded but popular boxer from New Jersey. A former nightclub bouncer, Wepner was nicknamed "The Bayonne Bleeder" and was considered a washed-up contender with a mediocre record. Don King selected Wepner as a tomato can to provide an easy victory for Ali after his famous win over George Foreman. In a surprising turn of events, Wepner scored a disputed knockdown in the ninth round, and survived 19 seconds short of the distance, before losing by TKO in the 15th round. Wepner's bout with Ali provided the inspiration for Sylvester Stallone's movie Rocky.

In a fight on February 11, 1990, Mike Tyson lost his championship to James "Buster" Douglas in Tokyo. The victory over Tyson, the previously undefeated "baddest man on the planet" and the most feared boxer in professional boxing at that time, at the hands of the 42–1 betting odds underdog Douglas, has been described as one of the most shocking upsets in modern sports history. Douglas was widely regarded as a tomato can, lined up to provide an easy victory for Tyson at that time. Later, Douglas lost his first title defense against Evander Holyfield and was never able to successfully compete at such a high level again.

On June 1, 2019, undefeated unified WBA (Super), IBF, WBO and IBO heavyweight champion Anthony Joshua lost to Andy Ruiz Jr., who was ranked WBO no. 11 and IBF no. 14, at Madison Square Garden in New York City. Ruiz Jr. got up from the canvas in round 3 and won the contest by technical knockout in round 7 having given Joshua a convincing beating, with Joshua's trainer later saying that Joshua had been severely concussed. Joshua was originally scheduled to face undefeated WBA no. 2 and WBO no. 3 ranked heavyweight Jarrell Miller, who was replaced by Ruiz Jr. after Miller failed three drug tests.

== Outside combat sports ==
The term "tomato can" is primarily used in the context of individual combat sports: boxing, kickboxing, mixed martial arts, and other sports of similar structure. The concept—if not the term—is also prevalent in team sports. In American college sports, it is common for teams in major conferences to schedule games against squads in conferences of lesser renown, with the expectation that the game will be a blowout in favor of the major conference team, in exchange for paying the less-renowned school a financial windfall. Like the tomato can in boxing, the less-renowned school can occasionally perform far beyond expectation, serving as potentially major embarrassment for the major college and having major ramifications on opinion polling.

A webcomic based on the idiom with the same name, The Tomato Can, launched on the webcomics platform WEBTOON.

== See also ==
- Freak show fight
- Gatekeeper (boxing)
- Glass Joe
- Job (professional wrestling)
- Journeyman (boxing)
- Paper candidate, for a similar concept in politics
