= Fight Night Round 2 =

2005 video game

- Cover art with boxer Bernard Hopkins
- Developer: EA Chicago
- Publisher: EA Sports
- Series: Fight Night
- Platforms: PlayStation 2, Xbox, GameCube
- Release: NA: March 1, 2005; EU: March 18, 2005; AU: March 22, 2005
- Genre: Sports
- Modes: Single-player, multiplayer

Fight Night Round 2 (also known as Fight Night 2005) is a 2005 boxing video game developed by EA Chicago and published by EA Sports. The sequel to Fight Night 2004, it was released for the PlayStation 2, Xbox and GameCube. It was the only game in the series to be released on a Nintendo platform; the GameCube version contains Little Mac from Nintendo's Punch-Out!! series as a playable character in addition to an emulated version of Super Punch-Out!! in a collaboration with Nintendo.

== Gameplay ==
Total Punch Control, a control scheme introduced in Fight Night 2004, returns in Fight Night Round 2. With Total Punch Control, movement and most maneuvers, including punching, leaning and blocking, are performed with the left or right analog sticks, modified by the left or right triggers. For example, with the default controller configuration, moving the right thumbstick up and to the left will cause the fighter to throw a straight punch with his left hand, while holding down the right trigger while performing the same movement and then holding will cause the fighter to raise his guard to the left side of his head, ready to attempt a parry.

Fight Night Round 2 expands upon the Total Punch Control scheme with the addition of another feature, the EA SPORTS Haymaker. An EA SPORTS Haymaker is a more powerful version of one of the basic power punches (hooks and uppercuts) and is performed by pulling the analog stick back before performing the movements for a regular punch. If it connects, a Haymaker causes quite a bit of damage, can stagger the victim and may cause an instant knockdown, regardless of the victim's health or stamina status. If blocked, the Haymaker does very little to no damage while consuming a great deal of stamina from the attacking boxer. If parried, the attacker is pushed off-balance and is left vulnerable to a Haymaker or combination attack.

Other features include:

- A slightly altered interface in which both fighter's health and stamina are displayed on the bottom of the screen.
- The addition of an amateur boxing league that has the fighters wear head protection and fight in shorter matches (typically 4 rounds)
- Joe Tessitore is the new commentator.
- Illegal maneuvers, including head butts, elbow attacks, and low blows. These attacks do somewhat more damage than a normal punch and have a greater chance of opening up a cut, but repeated usage will result in point deduction and eventual disqualification.
- All-new remodeled boxing gear including gloves, foul protectors, trunks, shoes & more.
- Clinching: Any boxer may attempt to clinch his opponent at any time. If successful, both boxers will regenerate health and stamina faster as long as they are clinched. Clinching too often, however, will result in point deductions and eventually, disqualification.
- KO Moment. When a fighter's health is depleted, the game enters the KO Moment. In this mode, the camera zooms in on the fighters and the crowd and announcer are muted and the defending boxer is unable to throw punches. If the ailing fighter accumulates enough damage or is hit by a Haymaker during this period, he will be knocked down. If the defending boxer escapes a knockdown, then after some time the game will return to normal and the defending fighter will be given a small amount of health. A successful clinch by either boxer will end the KO Moment prematurely. This feature can be toggled off.
- Cutman: a mini-game that takes place after every round. In this mini-game, the player manipulates the analog sticks in order to heal damage (bruises and cuts) to their boxer's face accumulated during the course of the match. If too much damage is incurred on any one area without being healed, the fight will end in a technical knockout (TKO) in favor of the injured boxer's opponent. This feature can be turned off for regular matches and is not available at all in the amateur league.
- Current and historical boxers from all weight classes like Muhammad Ali, Sugar Ray Robinson, Roy Jones Jr., Floyd Mayweather Jr., Manny Pacquiao, Bernard Hopkins, Roberto Durán, and Evander Holyfield. This is the only game in the series to feature Mayweather.
- EA SPORTS TRAXX: featuring music by Fabolous (who appears in the video game), David Banner, Geto Boys, and Pitbull.
- The GameCube version includes the SNES game Super Punch-Out!! as a bonus game. The game's protagonist, Little Mac, can become a playable fighter in the GameCube version of Fight Night Round 2 if the player either completes every circuit in Super Punch-Out!! or creates a new character in Fight Night Round 2 with "MACMAN" as the character's first name.
- Nine venues, including Atlantic City and Flushing, Queens.

== Reception ==
Reception

Aggregate score
Aggregator	Score		
Aggregator	GameCube	PS2	Xbox
Metacritic	87 / 100	88 / 100	88 / 100

Review scores
Publication	Score		
Publication	GameCube	PS2	Xbox
Edge	8 / 10	8 / 10	8 / 10
Electronic Gaming Monthly	8.33 / 10	8.33 / 10	8.33 / 10
Famitsu	32 / 40	32 / 40	N/A
Game Informer	9.25 / 10	9.25 / 10	9.25 / 10
GamePro	4.5/5	4.5/5	4.5/5
GameSpot	8.9 / 10	8.9 / 10	8.9 / 10
GameSpy	4/5	4.5/5	4.5/5
IGN	8.4 / 10	9 / 10	9 / 10
Nintendo Power	4.1 / 5	N/A	N/A
Official U.S. PlayStation Magazine	N/A	4.5/5	N/A
Official Xbox Magazine (US)	N/A	N/A	9 / 10
Cube	N/A	N/A	N/A
Detroit Free Press	N/A	3/4	N/A
The Times	N/A	4/5	4/5

Fight Night Round 2 received favorable reviews, more so than the first game, according to video game review aggregator Metacritic. In Japan, Famitsu gave the GameCube and PS2 versions a score of all four eights, for a total of 32 out of 40.

Contactmusic.com gave the Xbox version a score of nine out of ten and called it "the king of boxing titles". The Sydney Morning Herald gave the game a score of four stars out of five and said that "Controls work beautifully and patience and timing are crucial." The Times also gave the PS2 and Xbox versions four stars and stated: "Combinations become instinctive and defence second nature. Throw in an engrossing career mode, as well as the facility to create your own boxer, and you finally have a heavyweight boxing game." However, Detroit Free Press gave the PS2 version three stars out of four and stated that, "There are some things that made me grimace, such as the repetitive commentary and sluggish movement for online play."

The game was included on Game Informer's "Top 50 Games of 2005" list. During the 9th Annual Interactive Achievement Awards, Fight Night Round 2 received a nomination for "Fighting Game of the Year". IGN ranked it as the 93rd best PlayStation 2 game. The staff claimed that the series got its start with Round 2.
