= Punch-Out!! =

Video game series

- Logo since 2009
- Genre: Sports
- Developers: Nintendo R&D3 (1984–1994); Next Level Games (2009)
- Publisher: Nintendo
- Creator: Genyo Takeda
- Platforms: Arcade; Game & Watch; NES; SNES; Wii
- First release: Punch-Out!! February 17, 1984
- Latest release: Doc Louis's Punch-Out!! October 27, 2009

Punch-Out!! (Note: Japanese: パンチアウト!!, Hepburn: Panchi-Auto!!) is a boxing video game series created by Genyo Takeda, and published by Nintendo. The player controls Little Mac, a boxer who aims to become the World Video Boxing Association (W.V.B.A.) champion.

The original Punch-Out!! arcade game was first released in 1984, and was quickly followed by a sequel, titled Super Punch-Out!!. The series received its first home console entry in 1987, with Mike Tyson's Punch-Out!! for the Nintendo Entertainment System. In 1994, Super Punch-Out!! was released for the Super Nintendo Entertainment System. While not a direct port, it features gameplay more similar to the arcade games, rather than its NES predecessor.

Following a period of dormancy, the series was rebooted with Punch-Out!!, first released in 2009 for the Wii, along with a Club Nintendo-exclusive prequel, Doc Louis's Punch-Out!!. The series has received critical and commercial acclaim, with the NES game selling three million copies alone.

Spin-offs were also released, namely Punch-Out!! / Boxing (Game & Watch) in 1984, and Arm Wrestling in 1985.

== Gameplay ==
Playing as Little Mac, a 17-year old boxer from The Bronx, the player must climb the ranks of the World Video Boxing Association (W.V.B.A.), and fight their way against other boxers from around the world, going from the Minor Circuit then the Major Circuit and then the World Circuit, while fighting challengers including Glass Joe, King Hippo, Piston Hondo, Don Flamenco, Bald Bull, Mr. Sandman, or in the original NES version, the former heavyweight boxing champion himself, Mike Tyson. Gameplay differs slightly between each game, but generally, Mac can attack using his left and right fists, performing either a hook, a dodge, or a jab. He can also dodge and block to avoid the opponent's attacks, the block dealing less damage. Many games in the series give the player a powerful uppercut ability; its use is limited, must be earned during matches, and is earned from well-timed punches or rapid combos, depending on the game.

The key to defeating each opponent is to learn their fighting patterns, avoid their attacks and respond with a counterattack. Opponents will always give a visual or audible cue to signal their next attack, though as the game progresses, the time given to the player to successfully react significantly decreases. If the player successfully dodges an attack, the opponent will be left vulnerable for a while, allowing the player to strike back. Little Mac can block some of his opponent's punches by holding up his gloves, but he will eventually tire out if he blocks or gets hit too much.

== List of games ==
Release timeline Main entries in bold
1984	**Punch-Out!!** (Arcade)
1984	Punch-Out!! / Boxing
1984	**Super Punch-Out!!** (Arcade)
1985	Arm Wrestling
1986
1987	**Mike Tyson's Punch-Out!!**
1988–1993
1994	**Super Punch-Out!!** (SNES)
1995–2008
2009	**Punch-Out!!** (Wii)
2009	Doc Louis's Punch-Out!!

=== Main series ===
==== Punch-Out!! (1984) ====
Punch-Out!! was first released on February 17, 1984 in Japan. The concept originated as Nintendo had acquired an excessive number of video monitors following the success of Donkey Kong (1981). Tasked with creating a game that used two monitors per cabinet, Genyo Takeda of Nintendo R&D3 suggested they make a boxing game.

The game was re-released by Hamster as part of their Arcade Archives series in 2018 for Nintendo Switch.

==== Super Punch-Out!! (1984) ====
Super Punch-Out!! was first released in September 1984 in Japan. Gameplay is mostly the same as its predecessor, though it introduced ducking as a defensive maneuver, and several new enemy characters.

The game was re-released by Hamster as part of their Arcade Archives series in 2020 for Nintendo Switch.

==== Mike Tyson's Punch-Out!! ====
Mike Tyson's Punch-Out!! was first released in September 1987 in Japan for the Nintendo Entertainment System, as a prize for winners of the Family Computer Golf: U.S. Course tournament. The game received its first retail release the following month in North America. It formally introduced the protagonist, Little Mac (who was unnamed in the previous games) and his trainer Doc Louis.

In 1990, the game was re-released as simply Punch-Out!!, with Mike Tyson replaced with the fictional boxer Mr. Dream, due to the license for his name, image, and likeness rights expiring (primarily from his loss of the heavyweight title to Buster Douglas on the 11th of February 1990), leading Nintendo to not renew the contract. The game has since been re-released on Virtual Console for the Wii, Wii U, and Nintendo 3DS, as well as Nintendo Classics for Nintendo Switch and Nintendo Switch 2, all in the 1990 version, as Tyson is now signed to Electronic Arts as a playable character in the Fight Night and UFC franchises.

==== Super Punch-Out!! (1994) ====
Super Punch-Out!! was first released on October 24, 1994 in North America for the Super Nintendo Entertainment System. Although it shares the same name as the 1984 arcade game, it is not a direct port. However, it does feature mechanics that were absent in the NES game, such as the power meter.

The game has since been re-released on Virtual Console for the Wii, Wii U, and New Nintendo 3DS, as well as Nintendo Classics for Nintendo Switch and Nintendo Switch 2.

==== Punch-Out!! (2009) ====
Punch-Out!! was first released on May 18, 2009 in North America for the Wii. It is a reboot of the series, and the first to be developed by an outside studio, Next Level Games.

The game was re-released on Virtual Console for the Wii U in 2015.

=== Spin-offs ===
==== Punch-Out!! / Boxing ====
Boxing, known as Punch-Out!! in North America, was first released in July 1984 in Japan. It is the first game in the Micro Vs. Game & Watch line.

==== Arm Wrestling ====
Arm Wrestling was first released in 1985 in North America. The game was developed by Nintendo R&D3, the same team that developed the Punch-Out!! arcade games.

==== Doc Louis's Punch-Out!! ====
Doc Louis's Punch-Out!! was first released on October 27, 2009 in North America, for WiiWare as a Platinum reward for Club Nintendo members. The game is a prequel to Punch-Out!! (Wii), and features Little Mac sparring with his trainer Doc Louis.

The game was briefly made available once more to Club Nintendo members in 2015, prior to the service's shutdown.

=== In other games ===
==== Fight Night Round 2 ====
Super Punch-Out!! (SNES) is included in the GameCube version of EA Sports's Fight Night Round 2. Additionally, Little Mac, based on his appearance from the SNES game, can be unlocked as a playable character in the main game.

==== Captain Rainbow ====
Little Mac made a cameo appearance in skip Ltd.'s Captain Rainbow, where the title character must help Little Mac get in shape to regain his championship title.

==== Super Smash Bros. series ====
Little Mac first appeared as an assist trophy in Super Smash Bros. Brawl, before becoming a playable character in Super Smash Bros. for Nintendo 3DS and Wii U and Super Smash Bros. Ultimate.

== Appearances in other media ==
King Hippo served as a primary antagonist in the DIC Entertainment animated series Captain N: The Game Master.

Punch-Out!! would get referenced in Family Guy on multiple occasions. In "Tales of a Former Sport Glory", during Peter's boxing fight for the title they use the sound effects from the Arcade ("Nintendo") Punch-Out!!, since they were "out of budget to take it (music) from the movie." In "A Fistful of Meg", when Meg goes to Quagmire to help get training, they re-enact the famous bicycle scene from Mike Tyson's Punch-Out!!. And in "Not All Dogs go to Heaven", when Meg gets the family together to say grace and let's Peter lead, Peter prays to God for the cheat codes to Mike Tyson's Punch-Out!!, stating that he was stuck on Bald Bull for years.

The Super Mario Bros. Movie, co-produced by Nintendo and based on the company's Mario franchise, features a pizzeria in Brooklyn, New York City named after the Punch-Out!! series as a prominent location. Photos of characters from the games can also be seen inside the pizzeria.
