= Gatekeeper (boxing) =

Skilful and well-regarded fighter

In boxing, kickboxing and mixed martial arts, a gatekeeper is a skillful and well-regarded fighter, but one who does not have the popularity or brilliance of a title contender. They are considered to be a cut above most journeymen. A gatekeeper will often have an impressive record in terms of wins versus losses but will have a difficult time getting people behind them and especially obtaining promotion. They are often seen as a "stepping-stone" for potential title contenders to prove their worth against.

== Characteristics ==
Gatekeepers are sometimes relegated to fight contenders to boost the contender's stock shortly before a title fight.

== See also ==
- Journeyman (boxing)
- Tomato can (sports idiom)
