= Pro wrestling (disambiguation) =

Professional wrestling is an athletic exhibition that combines sports with entertainment.

Pro wrestling may also refer to:

- Pro Wrestling (NES video game), Nintendo's wrestling video game
- Pro Wrestling (Sega Master System video game), Sega's wrestling video game

== See also ==
- Wrestling (disambiguation)
