= Super Punch-Out!! =

1994 video game

- North American cover art depicting (from left to right) Mr. Sandman, Bald Bull and Super Macho Man, the three initial champions in the game
- Developer: Nintendo R&D3
- Publisher: Nintendo
- Directors: Makoto Wada; Yasuyuki Oyagi
- Producer: Genyo Takeda
- Programmer: Masato Hatakeyama
- Artist: Makoto Wada
- Composers: Takashi Kumegawa; Masaru Sakakibara
- Series: Punch-Out!!
- Platform: Super Nintendo Entertainment System
- Release: NA: October 24, 1994; UK: February 10, 1995; JP: March 1, 1998
- Genre: Sports (boxing)
- Modes: Single-player, multiplayer

Super Punch-Out!! (Note: Japanese: スーパーパンチアウト！！, Hepburn: Sūpā Panchi-Auto!!) is a boxing video game developed and published by Nintendo for the Super Nintendo Entertainment System (SNES). It was released on October 24, 1994, in North America, in the United Kingdom on February 10, 1995, and in Japan in 1998 for the Super Famicom through the Nintendo Power flash RAM cartridge series. The game is also included in the GameCube version of Fight Night Round 2 as an extra game due to the inclusion of Little Mac in the game. The game was released for the Wii's Virtual Console in Europe on March 20, 2009, in North America on March 30, 2009, and in Japan on July 7, 2009. The game was also released on the New Nintendo 3DS eShop on May 5, 2016. Nintendo re-released Super Punch-Out!! in the United States in September 2017 as part of the company's Super NES Classic Edition. It is the fourth game in the Punch-Out!! series, taking place after the Punch-Out!! game for the Nintendo Entertainment System (NES).

In Super Punch-Out!! the player controls a boxer as he fights his way to become the World Video Boxing Association champion. Players, fighting from a "behind the back" perspective, must knockout their opponent in three minutes to win. Players can launch jabs, hooks, and uppercuts against their opponents as well as block, dodge, and duck opponents' attacks. Nintendo Integrated Research and Development, led by Genyo Takeda, Minoru Arakawa and Makoto Wada, developed the game. It also featured voice acting by Mike Shapiro and Charles Martinet.

The game received praise from reviewers for its cartoon-like style, its colorful, outlandish opponents, simple gameplay controls, and replay value. The game also featured colorful, detailed graphics, which included the usage of transparency that facilitates the game's "behind the back" perspective. Other reviewers had said that this game lacked the overall appeal, gameplay, or audience of its predecessor.

== Gameplay ==
The gameplay in Super Punch-Out!! is more similar to that of its arcade and NES predecessors. The player controls a nameable boxer as he fights his way to become W.V.B.A. Champion. The player controls the boxer from a third-person perspective, with him being translucent on the screen, similar to the wireframe avatar used in the arcade game. Players can attack their opponents with jabs to the face or with body blows from either hand. The opponent can deflect punches, so players must aim at the opponent's open spot (where the gloves are not) to connect. Depending on the opponents' stances, they will guard themselves differently, so players need to use the correct punches.

As in the first two arcade games of the series, players have a power meter, located on the bottom of the screen. The meter fills up as the player lands punches against the opponent, and it goes down as the player gets hit. When the power meter fills up completely, the player will be able to launch knockout punches such as uppercuts, hooks, and rapid punches. These punches have a slight delay in execution, but they cause more damage to the opponent. Players can also build power as the match progresses, as indicated by the background color behind the player's face on the upper left corner of the screen, which goes from blue to green to yellow to red. The player reaches "Power-Up" status when the background color reaches red. During this status, the player's punch speed and power increase. They lose their Power-Up status if they are knocked down.

The player fights Dragon Chan, who is attempting to kick the player. The player dodges to the right to avoid the kick.

Players can avoid attacks from their opponents by dodging to the left or right or by ducking, but players cannot punch while dodging or ducking, nor can they duck body blows. They can also block attacks to either the head or the body, but they cannot block strong punches; strong punches must be avoided by dodging or ducking. Depending on the situation, the player must strategically block, dodge, rope, or duck in order to avoid an opponent's attack. Players can capitalize on the opponent's attacks by launching counter-punches immediately after avoiding an attack.

Both the player and the opponent have stamina meters, both displayed on the top of the screen. The meters decrease when either boxer gets hit by a punch. Boxers will get knocked down if their stamina meter runs out. Faster knockdowns will cause that boxer to recover less stamina upon getting up; the same happens if a boxer is knocked down by a knockout punch. Either boxer will lose if they cannot stand up before the count of ten after being knocked down (resulting in a knockout or KO) or if they are knocked down three times in the match (resulting in a technical knockout or TKO). The player can also recover some stamina while the opponent is down by pressing the buttons on the controller.

A meter not displayed on screen is what many skilled players refer to as a "dizzy threshold". This means that if a player manages to land a given number of consecutive punches, it will put the opponent into a brief "dizzy" or "stunned" animation. A "dizzied" or "stunned" opponent will appear shaken for a short period of time (in which the match timer freezes temporarily), and the player has a small margin of opportunity to achieve an instant knockdown with a well-timed knockout punch. Each of the 16 opponents varies in how much match time it takes to become "dizzied", some more quickly than others. There are two opponents who can be knocked out upon the first knockdown, however, a knockdown during a "dizzy" animation is critical in making this possible. There are eight opponents who can be knocked out in two knockdowns, however, the player must achieve the second knockdown within four seconds of the first knockdown. Finally, there are six opponents who the player must defeat via a TKO as the aforementioned four seconds between the first two knockdowns does not apply.

The player has three minutes to knock out the opponent. After three minutes, the match ends, and the player loses; the player cannot win by a decision. After losing, the player can use a continue and fight a rematch. The game ends after all continues have been used; the player must fight all opponents in the current circuit again. The game consists of four circuits, the fourth of which can only be unlocked if the player has never suffered a loss. The player can retry any circuit that has already been beaten. The game has a battery–backed memory in which players can save their data and records for future play.

In 2022, it was revealed that the use of a button prompted cheat code, a hidden two-player game mode can be unlocked. This works on all versions with no hacking required.

== Development and release ==
Super Punch-Out!! is the fourth game in the Punch-Out!! series and was developed by Nintendo Integrated Research and Development and was produced by Minoru Arakawa, Genyo Takeda and Makoto Wada. Mike Shapiro and Charles Martinet provided the voices of the boxers, the referee and the announcer. Nintendo IRD was developing this game simultaneously with Zoda's Revenge: StarTropics II. The game is the closest arcade-to-home console translation of the Punch-Out!! and Super Punch-Out!! arcade games; however, like the NES title, the Super NES title is not a direct port. Shortly before the game was finished and released, some screenshots and video footage of the prototype were shown in a video preview of the game, as well as in an issue of Nintendo Power magazine and two official television commercials, which all showed the protagonist of the game with a different look as well as the announcer having a different voice compared to the ones in the final version seen in the finished and released version. The game had a marketing budget of $3.5 million.

Super Punch-Out!! was released in North America October 1994, in Europe on January 26, 1995, and in Japan as part of the Nintendo Power service on March 1, 1998, which allowed users to download the game unto a rewriteable flash RAM cartridge via a kiosk. In addition, Electronic Arts included the game as an unlockable bonus item along with its protagonist as an unlockable boxer in the GameCube version of Fight Night Round 2 as part of Nintendo's deal of featuring Nintendo characters in the GameCube versions of some EA Sports titles. The game was later released for the Wii's Virtual Console service in Europe and Australia on March 20, 2009, followed by North America and Japan on March 30, 2009. In 2016, the game was re-released via the New Nintendo 3DS Virtual Console. It was later added to the Nintendo Classics library on December 12, 2019.

== Reception ==
Reception

Aggregate score
| Aggregator | Score |
|---|---|
| GameRankings | 84% (based on 3 reviews) |

Review scores
| Publication | Score |
|---|---|
| AllGame | 4/5 |
| Electronic Gaming Monthly | 86%; 79% |
| Famitsu | 26/40 |
| Game Informer | 8.75/10 |
| GamePro | 18.5/20 |
| IGN | 8/10 |
| Next Generation | 4/5 |
| VideoGames & Computer Entertainment | 80% |
| Game Players | 90% |

Super Punch-Out!! received a rave review in GamePro. The reviewer praised the game's good controls, "deceptive challenge", sprite layouts, animations, and sounds which "juice the game's intensity level". He stated the game's one flaw was "the lack of an easy-to-use two-player mode." The magazine ran alternate reviews by Fred Doughty and Mark Guinane, winners of the 1994 Blockbuster Video World Game Championship. They also gave the game positive assessments, praising the easy-to-learn controls, high challenge level, and artistic design of the characters. Electronic Gaming Monthly's two sports game reviewers criticized the game's unrealistic style, but nonetheless acknowledged that "it still has fantastic game play." Next Generation reviewed the game, and stated that most everything in the game was "done to perfection", making the game "a great tribute to the original classic."

Several reviewers praised Super Punch-Out!! overall for not trying to be realistic, for the originality of its different opponents, and for its simple controls. Chris Scullion from Official Nintendo Magazine praises the game for its outlandish characters, addictive gameplay, and simple controls. He adds that Super Punch-Out!! is "superb way to prepare for the upcoming Wii [Punch-Out!!] title". Scullion states that "the thing that makes Super Punch-Out!! interesting (along with the rest of the games in the series) is that it's not a realistic boxing game". He adds that the opponents in the game are "the real stars of the show", with each opponent having a unique personality, traits, and boxing styles. Skyler Miller from Allgame, like Scullion, praised the game for its simple, responsive controls, for its colorful, detailed opponents, and for its usage of the Super NES's transparent color palette for the fighter, which facilitates the "behind the back" perspective. He also appreciates the game's sound and music, in particular the usage of real voice for the announcer. Game Players magazine applauded the game's "large, colorful graphics and easy-to-learn controls".

Reviewers have praised Super Punch-Out!! for its other unique features and for its rewarding difficulty. Game Informer magazine praised the game for its time attack mode, which recorded and kept track of the fastest knockouts for each opponent. Miller also commended the time attack mode, adding to the game's replay value. Another review from VideoGames & Computer Entertainment magazine lauded the game for a fair difficulty curve, stating that it "is a really tough game, but it's one in which repeated playing (and you will be playing it a lot) really pays off". Lucas Thomas from IGN, while praising the game overall, says that the game lacks the overall appeal that the NES version had and that he recommends the NES version over this version. He notes that the sound is "Not as memorable as the music from the NES game, but [is] more varied". He says that many people who are familiar with the NES version have to relearn new attack patterns from different opponents. Thomas also notes that the game did not have as large an audience as the NES version enjoyed.

=== Accolades ===
In 1995, Total! placed the game 27th in its list of Top 100 SNES Games. In 1997, Electronic Gaming Monthly ranked it the 56th best console video game of all time, explaining the decision to include it instead of Punch-Out!!: "The NES version is great, but the Super NES one is even better, with large, well-animated characters, great control and a near-perfect learning curve." In 2011, IGN ranked the game 17th on its list of top 100 SNES games of all time. In 2018, Complex rated the game number 18 on its "The Best Super Nintendo Games of All Time" list.
