= Arm Wrestling (video game) =

1985 video game

- Arcade flyer
- Developer: Nintendo R&D3
- Publisher: Nintendo
- Producer: Genyo Takeda
- Designer: Genyo Takeda
- Artist: Shigeru Miyamoto
- Composer: Koji Kondo
- Series: Punch-Out!!
- Platform: Arcade
- Release: NA: May 1985
- Genre: Sports
- Mode: Single-player

Arm Wrestling is a 1985 video game developed and published by Nintendo for arcades. It is similar in gameplay to the Punch-Out!! series and created by the same development team. Arm Wrestling has many of the same features, such as a dual-monitor system and quirky computer opponents, but never caught on or received a home port of any sort.

== Development ==
The game was developed by Nintendo R&D3, the same team that created the Punch-Out!! series. It is the final dedicated arcade game Nintendo both developed and distributed. The game's announcer uses some voice samples of Han (Shih Kien) from the 1973 film Enter the Dragon, and original ones. It shares multiple similarities to the Punch-Out!! arcade games, including the use of multiple screens, similar visuals, and the same graphics engine.

== Gameplay ==
The first match against Texas Mac

The goal is to become the World Arm Wrestling Champion by defeating as many opponents in arm wrestling as possible. The player must compete against five different computer opponents and pin them in a timed match. The opponents are:

- Texas Mac, a stereotypical Texan in a cowboy hat
- Kabuki, a Japanese sumo wrestler
- Mask X, actually Bald Bull from Punch-Out!! in a mask
- Alice & Ape III, a little girl controlling a monkey robot via remote
- Frank Jr., an homage to Frankenstein's monster as popularized in the 1930s films

Controls consist of a button and a two-position joystick that can also be pulled straight up from the panel.

A referee gives a signal to begin each match. Touching any control before the signal is given results in a foul; if the player commits two fouls in the same match, the game immediately ends.

During the match, the player must attack the computer opponent by pressing left on the joystick. The game foreshadows a counterattack when the opponent makes a strange face. Moving the joystick to the right at the proper moment causes the opponent to become briefly stunned, during which time the player can tap the button for bonus points and an increase in attacking power. Against certain opponents, the player must move the joystick in particular ways to dodge surprise attacks, some of which can lead to an instant loss if they connect.

In order to win a match, the player must pin the opponent's arm to the table within one minute; the game ends if the player is pinned or if time runs out. After the second and fifth victories, the player can earn bonus points by catching a sack of money thrown from above, pulling up on the joystick at the proper moment as it falls. Once Frank Jr. is defeated, the game begins again with increased difficulty and Kabuki as the fifth opponent rather than the second.

If the player wins a total of 20 matches, the tournament organizer declares the event closed due to running out of prize money and the game ends.

== Reception ==
Arm Wrestling was neither as popular or as well-received as the Punch-Out!! arcade games. JC Fletcher of Joystiq hoped that Arm Wrestling would be released on the Wii's Virtual Console service, to widen its audience. Anthony Burch of Destructoid said it was strange due to it not representing what arm wrestling actually feels like, though that the strange controls and visual similarity to Punch-Out!! make it intriguing. He ultimately enjoyed the game, which may be due to its speed and the fact that he felt soreness in his arm after playing. However, he found it too shallow and short. Jeremy Parish of USgamer said its obscurity was due to it being too visually impressive to be reproduced on the NES, and that adapting it would be difficult due to shallow gameplay. He said that Arm Wrestling cabinets were likely hard to find and expensive.
