= Zoda's Revenge: StarTropics II =

1994 video game

- North American box art
- Developers: Nintendo R&D3; Locomotive Corporation
- Publisher: Nintendo
- Directors: Genyo Takeda; Makoto Wada
- Producer: Genyo Takeda
- Programmer: Shigeo Kimura
- Artists: Makoto Wada; Yoshiyuki Kato
- Writer: Genyo Takeda
- Composers: Yoshio Hirai; Takashi Kumegawa
- Series: StarTropics
- Platform: Nintendo Entertainment System
- Release: NA: March 1994
- Genre: Action-adventure game
- Mode: Single player

Zoda's Revenge: StarTropics II is an action-adventure video game developed and published by Nintendo for the Nintendo Entertainment System, and the sequel to StarTropics. It was released in North America in 1994, making it the second-to-last first-party game released on the NES, with Wario's Woods being the last, and the final game developed by Nintendo exclusively for the NES, with Wario's Woods having also been released for the Super NES, excluding re-releases and international distributions of other games by Nintendo.

It was released on the Wii Virtual Console in December 2008 in North America and on July 10, 2009, in the PAL regions. It was released on the Wii U Virtual Console in Europe on September 3, 2015, in Australia on September 4, 2015, and in North America on May 26, 2016.

== Gameplay ==
Zoda's Revenge takes place across nine chapters, with each one besides the first taking place in a different time period and having enemies and bosses to fight, areas to explore, weapons and medicine to find, and obstacles and puzzles to solve. While the original StarTropics took place almost exclusively on tropical islands in the South Seas, Zoda's Revenge takes place across various time periods, such as the Stone Age, Ancient Egypt, the Wild West, the Middle Ages, and Victorian England.

Mike meets historical and fictional figures during his journey through time, including Cleopatra, Merlin, Sherlock Holmes, Leonardo da Vinci, and King Arthur, who help him to achieve his goal of finding the Tetrads, which resemble Tetris pieces and were renamed "Blocks" in the Virtual Console release, and defeating Zoda's three clones.

Zoda's Revenge runs on a modified engine of the original StarTropics. Like StarTropics, health is measured by heart containers, but unlike it, Mike can move in eight different directions and change directions in mid-jump, and he can now move freely as opposed to being locked to a grid. He also uses several new weapons, including Tink's Axe, Cleopatra's Bronze Dagger, and Leonardo's Katana, as well as the Psychic Shock Wave, an upgradable projectile magic attack that he learns from Merlin. Unlike the Island Yo-Yo, Shooting Star and the Super Nova in StarTropics, only the psychic weapons are affected by how many heart containers Mike has. Occasionally, Mike encounters enemies that react differently depending on which weapon is used to attack.

== Plot ==
The story takes place after the events of the original game, with Mike Jones receiving a telepathic message from Mica, the princess of the Argonians whom he had rescued. She tells Mike how to solve a cipher that he and his uncle, Dr. Jones, found on the side of the Argonians’ space pod. Mike goes to see Jones, and together, they solve the cipher and read it aloud, causing Mike to be sent back in time to the Stone Age. After helping a tribe of cavemen save their children from a flesh-eating wild boar, he finds an object, which Mica identifies as a Tetrad. Mike's journey sends him to different eras of Earth’s history to retrieve the rest of the Tetrads, including Ancient Egypt, the Renaissance period, and the Middle Ages.

During one time jump, in which Mike helps Sherlock Holmes prevent a robbery at a museum, he discovers that Zoda, the aliens' leader whom he had defeated, is alive in Holmes’ time period and is also trying to collect the Tetrads. Mike defeats Zoda again and claims the Tetrad that he was trying to steal. As Zoda referred to himself as "Zoda-X", Holmes deduces that there is likely a Zoda-Y and Zoda-Z somewhere in time. This is proven to be true, as Mike later faces and defeats Zoda-Y in Transylvania. After recovering the last of the Tetrads, Mica contacts Mike and tells him that Zoda-Z has attacked C-Island, where the Argonians are staying. Mike returns to the present and faces Zoda-Z in combat. After defeating Zoda, the Chief of C-Island helps Mike assemble the Tetrads together, causing Hirocon, the leader of the Argonians and Mica's father, to appear. He explains he had sealed himself in the Tetrads and scattered them across time before Zoda's attack before leaving with the Argonians to rebuild Argonia.

== Reception ==
Reception

Review scores
Publication	Score
Electronic Gaming Monthly	(NES) 6.4/10
Eurogamer	(Wii) 7/10
GamePro	(NES) 16/20
IGN	(Wii) 8.5/10
Nintendo Life	(Wii) 8/10

Electronic Gaming Monthly's five reviewers said the game has "plenty of action" but "really doesn't stand out and is too little too late for a dated system". GamePro's Manny LaMancha gave the NES version a generally positive review, saying that the graphics and controls, while below average compared to its contemporaries, are an improvement over the first game, and concluded that "this playful sequel does the hardware proud". LaMancha especially praised the quality of the edutainment.
