= Nintendo Integrated Research & Development =

Defunct R&D division of Nintendo

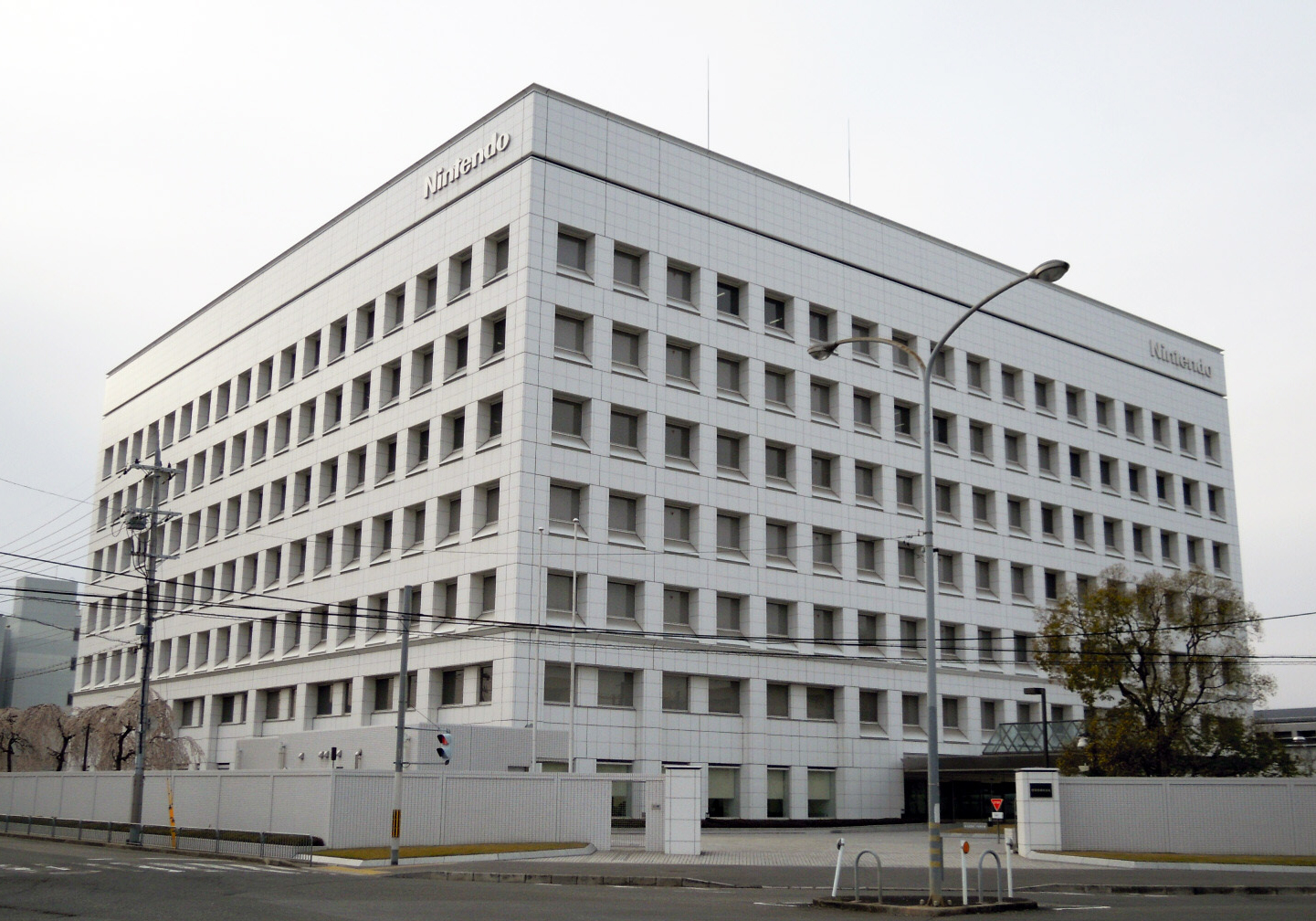
- Exterior of the Nintendo Central Office in Kyoto, where the IRD division was housed until 2014
- Native name: 任天堂総合開発本部
- Romanized name: Nintendō Sōgō Kaihatsu Honbu
- Type: Division
- Industry: Video games
- Founded: 1980; 46 years ago, as Nintendo Research & Development 3; 2000; 26 years ago, as Nintendo IRD
- Founder: Genyo Takeda
- Defunct: September 16, 2015; 11 years ago
- Fate: Merged with Nintendo System Development and folded into Nintendo Technology Development Division
- Successor: Nintendo Platform Technology Development
- Headquarters: Kyoto, Japan
- Key people: Genyo Takeda (General Manager); Satoru Okada (RED General Manager)
- Products: Various Nintendo video game consoles
- Parent: Nintendo
- Divisions: Integrated Research & Development; Research & Engineering Department

Nintendo Integrated Research & Development Division, (Note: Japanese: 任天堂総合開発本部, Hepburn: Nintendō Sōgō Kaihatsu Honbu) commonly abbreviated as Nintendo IRD, was a division of Nintendo that developed video game console hardware and associated peripherals. Originally established in 1980 with engineer Genyo Takeda acting as manager, Nintendo Research & Development No. 3 Department (Note: Known in Japan as Nintendō Kaihatsu Daisan Bu (任天堂開発第三部), commonly abbreviated as Nintendo R&D3) and part of the Manufacturing Division, the department was responsible for various hardware technologies and even developed several arcade and console titles. In 2000, as technology evolved into the 3D era, Takeda's group spun-off and established itself as a division into Integrated Research & Development Division, and began spending longer periods of time researching and testing the various and rapidly evolving hardware that would power Nintendo's next generation of consoles.

The Integrated Development Division (Note: Japanese: 統合開発本部, Hepburn: Tōgō kaihatsu honbu) comprised two coexisting departments: the Nintendo IRD, which was responsible for the development of Nintendo's home console hardware and related peripherals, and the Research & Engineering Development Department (Nintendo RED), which was responsible for the development of Nintendo's handheld game console hardware and associated peripherals. Both departments were further divided into several groups.

On February 16, 2013, Nintendo announced that the Nintendo RED was absorbed into Nintendo IRD Division. On September 16, 2015, IRD merged with the Nintendo System Development division, becoming the Nintendo Platform Technology Development.

== History ==
In December 1980, Genyo Takeda was promoted to manager of the Nintendo R&D3 department.

== Hardware developed ==
General Manager: Genyo Takeda

The Integrated Research & Development Department (or IRD) was the hardware development team responsible for all of Nintendo's home video game consoles and associated peripherals. The department was split into five different groups who worked together on most projects, with each group generally focusing on a different aspect of product design. The manager, Genyo Takeda, and most of the chief engineers originated from the Nintendo R&D3 hardware division.

Year	Title	Platform(s)
1984	Punch-Out!!	Arcade
1984	Super Punch-Out!!	Arcade
1985	Arm Wrestling	Arcade
1985	Famicom/NES Game Pak	Nintendo Entertainment System
1986	Pro Wrestling	Nintendo Entertainment System
1987	Mike Tyson's Punch-Out!!	Nintendo Entertainment System
1990	StarTropics	Nintendo Entertainment System
1994	Zoda's Revenge: StarTropics II	Nintendo Entertainment System
1994	Super Punch-Out!!	Super Nintendo Entertainment System
1996	Nintendo 64	Hardware
1996	Pilotwings 64	Nintendo 64
1996	Controller Pak	Nintendo 64
1997	Transfer Pak	Nintendo 64
1997	Rumble Pak	Nintendo 64
1998	Expansion Pak	Nintendo 64
1999	Nintendo 64DD	Nintendo 64
2001	GameCube	Hardware
2001	GameCube controller	GameCube
2001	Memory Card	GameCube
2002	Memory Card 251	GameCube
2002	WaveBird Wireless Controller	GameCube
2003	Game Boy Player	GameCube
2006	Wii	Hardware
2006 (2010)	Wii Remote (Plus)	Wii
2006	Nunchuk	Wii
2006 (2009)	Classic Controller (Pro)	Wii
2006	Wii Component Cables	Wii
2007	Wii Zapper	Wii
2008	Wii Wheel	Wii
2008	Wii Balance Board	Wii
2008	Wii Speak	Wii
2009	Wii MotionPlus	Wii
2012	Nintendo 3DS XL	Hardware
2012	Wii U	Hardware
2012	Wii U GamePad	Wii U
2012	Wii U Pro Controller	Wii U
2013	Nintendo 2DS	Hardware
2014	New Nintendo 3DS	Hardware
2014	New Nintendo 3DS XL	Hardware
