= Punch-Out!! (2009 video game) =

Boxing video game

- North American box art featuring Little Mac in the foreground, with Glass Joe, Von Kaiser, King Hippo, and Disco Kid in the background
- Developer: Next Level Games (Note: Nvidia Lightspeed Studios developed the Nvidia Shield version.)
- Publisher: Nintendo
- Directors: Jason Carr; Mike Inglehart
- Producers: Jared Johnson; Ken Yeeloy; Kensuke Tanabe
- Designers: Jamie Ip; Matt McTavish
- Programmer: Tedd Streibel
- Artist: Eddie Visser
- Writer: Naoki Mori
- Composers: Mike Peacock; Darren Radtke; Chad York
- Series: Punch-Out!!
- Platform: Wii
- Release: NA: May 18, 2009; EU: May 22, 2009; JP: July 23, 2009; AU: August 27, 2009
- Genre: Sports
- Modes: Single-player, multiplayer

Punch-Out!! is a 2009 boxing video game developed by Next Level Games and published by Nintendo for the Wii. It is the fifth and most recent mainline game in the Punch-Out!! series, following the SNES version of Super Punch-Out!!, and is a reboot of the series.

Following an early release at the Nintendo World Store in New York City on May 16, 2009, the game was released on May 18, 2009, in North America, May 22, 2009, in Europe, July 23, 2009, in Japan, and August 27, 2009, in Australia (exclusively at JB Hi-Fi stores). An additional WiiWare title, Doc Louis's Punch-Out!!, was released exclusively for North American Club Nintendo members on October 27, 2009. It was re-released under the Nintendo Selects label in 2011 for North American audiences only, as well as through the Wii U's Nintendo eShop in 2015 in all regions.

Upon release, Punch-Out!! received praise from critics for its gameplay, graphics, presentation, controls, and sense of nostalgia, though some criticism was given for its stereotypical character designs. It was also a commercial success for Nintendo, selling 1.27 million copies worldwide.

== Gameplay ==
A match between Little Mac and King Hippo

Punch-Out!! features a boxer named Little Mac working his way up the professional boxing circuits, facing a series of colorful, fictional boxers. The game requires reflexes to react to the computer-controlled boxers' moves. All of the boxers from the NES game except for Mike Tyson/Mr. Dream return, along with Bear Hugger and Aran Ryan from Super Punch-Out!! and new opponents Disco Kid, Giga Mac, and Donkey Kong. The game allows three different control schemes. The Wii Remote and Nunchuk can be used together, a Wii Balance Board can be used along with the Wii Remote and Nunchuk to duck or dodge, or the Wii Remote can be used by itself and held sideways in a traditional two-button control scheme.

In each stage, players must rely on quick reactions and identify various tells from their opponent to dodge or block their attacks, before returning with attacks to either the torso or the head with the left and right fists. Stars are awarded for landing a punch at particular moments, such as when an opponent grins or taunts Little Mac, and can be used to throw Star Punches that deal extra damage. The player can store up to three stars, but will lose them if hit by the opponent. Each fighter has a stamina gauge which results in a knockdown when fully depleted, with the player able to recover stamina while the opponent is down. Additionally, the player has a heart counter that decreases upon being hit, blocking an opponent's punch, or having a punch blocked by the opponent. If the counter reaches zero, the player will be unable to attack and will be vulnerable until they can successfully dodge an attack. A fight can end by knockout (KO), if a fighter is unable to rise within 10 seconds after being knocked down; by technical knockout (TKO), if a fighter is knocked down three times in one round; or by decision, if neither fighter achieves a KO or TKO after three rounds. Against certain opponents, the player can score an automatic KO by landing a Star Punch at the right moment, regardless of the opponent's stamina or number of knockdowns in the current round. The player also has a limited number of total knockdowns that can be sustained in a match. In Contender mode, the player has a maximum of four knockdowns. In Title Defense, that number is reduced to three. Once that number is exceeded, the player will be immediately knocked out with no chance to recover, even if they have not reached the three-knockdown threshold for a TKO. However upon reaching the maximum number of knockdowns, by mashing the A and B buttons during Little Mac's knockout animation, the player has a chance to save themselves through sheer will and return to the fight with a small fraction of health.

Two single-player campaign options are available. The Career option begins in Contender mode, in which Little Mac must climb the ranks of the World Video Boxing Association by rising through the Minor, Major, and World Circuits. Once Mac wins the world championship title, the game enters the more challenging Title Defense mode; he must now defend his belt against the other fighters, who use new techniques and defenses (such as King Hippo protecting his stomach with a manhole cover). Completing Title Defense unlocks Mac's Last Stand, an endurance mode in which Mac faces off against an endless series of randomly chosen opponents, one of whom is Donkey Kong. Once Mac loses three times, he retires from boxing and the Career option for the player's save file will become disabled, requiring the player to create a new file to play this option again. The Exhibition option allows players to fight against any opponents they have already defeated in either Contender or Title Defense, attempting to complete unique achievements, or practice against a holographic image of their current opponent. If the player wins 10 fights in Mac's Last Stand, an additional Champions Mode option is unlocked for Exhibition, in which a single hit will knock Mac down. Moreover, if during the Contender and Title Defense modes the player loses 100 fights, the headgear handicap will be unlocked, which significantly reduces the damage Little Mac takes from most attacks. However, this handicap is disabled in Mac's Last Stand.

New to the series is a split-screen multiplayer mode between Little Mac and a recolored clone. When one of the players has gathered enough power by repeatedly dodging all moves unscathed, that player's character transforms into a giant known as "Giga Mac" for a limited time and the game shifts to the opponent's single-player view until he returns to normal.

=== Doc Louis's Punch-Out!! ===
Doc Louis's Punch-Out!! is a standalone spin-off title and prequel, which was released on WiiWare as a Platinum reward for Club Nintendo members in North America on October 27, 2009. The game sees Little Mac sparring with his coach, Doc Louis, through three matches of increasing difficulty; the player wins each match by knocking Doc down once in three rounds. The game features three difficulty levels: Warm-up, Training, and Sparring. The game features the same graphics, voice acting, and game engine as the Wii version of Punch-Out!!, although it is not compatible with the Wii Balance Board.

Doc Louis' Punch-Out!! was once again made available to Club Nintendo members on February 2, 2015, this time as a purchasable coin prize as part of the service's closing promotion. This was the first time in over five years that the game was made available through any means.

== Development ==
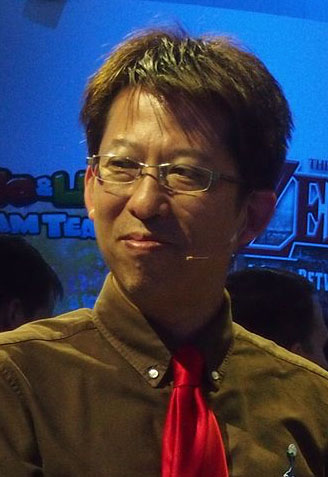
Kensuke Tanabe, seen here at the E3 in 2013, was the producer for Punch-Out!! on Wii.

The game was revealed in 2008 at the Nintendo Media Summit, where a fifteen-second trailer was shown. It was later announced that it was being developed by Next Level Games, which had partnered with Nintendo on games such as Super Mario Strikers (2005). Nintendo wished to make a new iteration similar to the original Punch-Out!! for the NES, so they asked the studio to design the gameplay to be exactly like it and the characters to look like the original games. This led to the studio designing the game with classic NES-style controls by using the Wii Remote turned sideways. Pre-production started when the Wii was released. At the time, Nintendo was discussing the idea with the studio. Soon after that, the studio created a prototype of the game.

In an interview, the game's producer, Kensuke Tanabe, described the development as a collaborative effort between the staff of Next Level Games and Nintendo of Japan. As an example of this, Tanabe said that the roster of opponents that are in the game were chosen by people of both studios, Next Level wanting to include more NES characters. When asked about the challenges of bringing an old franchise to the current generation, the game's gameplay lead, Bryce Holliday, said that the most difficult thing to figure out was how to design the gameplay and where to locate the camera. The game has a cel-shaded cartoon graphical style, which was a decision of Next Level. Both of the developers wanted to design the graphics in a way that would be immediately identifiable to any person who catches a glimpse of the game. They also wanted to invoke the style of the previous iterations while at the same time creating some new visuals. Holliday called the style "the logical choice".

The inclusion of Donkey Kong was a suggestion from an employee of Nintendo of America, and Tanabe also wished to include Princess Peach, but the idea was abandoned because of the possible negative reception of violence towards women. The reason that there were not many notable Nintendo characters in the game is because the studio wanted to solidify the game's own respective universe. The Title Defense mode was designed to make the game more of a standalone game and not just a nostalgia title, and also to make the game longer. The developers liked this since it added more personality to the characters. The studio adjusted the difficulty level in order to make the game easier to pick up and play. The game's 2-player mechanic was a difficult task to create, according to Tanabe, because the series had no template to base it on.

There were various additions to the game that were cut from the final product. One of these was online multiplayer, which Next Level Games had previously experimented with for Mario Strikers Charged (2007). while another feature was the ability to move around the ring in a 3D environment. This idea was scrapped so that the game would have the same feel as the older games in the series. Other features include character customization, other RPG elements, and minigames. The game also featured an Easter egg from the Sailor Moon manga series, where the character Piston Hondo was reading an altered version of the manga in his Title Defense match. An anonymously sourced story claimed it was not approved of beforehand and resulted in Nintendo having to quietly pay licensing fees for the rights to feature the Easter egg.

== Reception ==
Reception

Aggregate scores
Aggregator	Score
GameRankings	87%
Metacritic	86/100

Review scores
Publication	Score
1Up.com	A+
Famitsu	26/40
Game Informer	9/10
GameSpot	8.5/10
Giant Bomb	5/5
IGN	8.8/10
Nintendo Life	9/10
Nintendo Power	8.5/10
Nintendo World Report	10/10
Official Nintendo Magazine	91%

Punch-Out!! received critical acclaim, averaging an 86/100 and an 87.29% at Metacritic and GameRankings, respectively. Nintendo Power's Chris Slate scored the game an 8.5/10 in the magazine's June 2009 issue, praising its similarity to the NES title of the same name. Slate stated "The folks at Next Level Games have created an amazing title that has made the 15 years since Super Punch-Out!! quite worthwhile." However, he said that the new additions did not affect the game. Game Informer gave Punch-Out!! a 9/10. IGN's Craig Harris gave this game an 8.8/10, citing its nostalgic gameplay. Sumantra Lahiri of The Escapist also praised its nostalgic value, but suggested that the stereotypes exhibited by the characters that seemed harmless in the 1980s had not aged well when early 21st century attitudes towards cultural and racial sensitivity were taken into account.

During the 13th Annual Interactive Achievement Awards, the Academy of Interactive Arts & Sciences nominated Punch-Out!! for "Fighting Game of the Year".

The game sold 1.27 million copies worldwide, being one of just 60 Wii titles to reach one million sales, and as such was re-released under the Nintendo Selects banner.
