= Captain Rainbow =

2008 video game

- Japanese box art
- Developer: Skip Ltd.
- Publisher: Nintendo
- Director: Ryosuke Sumida
- Producers: Kensuke Tanabe; Hiroshi Suzuki
- Designers: Tomoaki Fukuda; Jun Taniguchi
- Writer: Kenichi Nishi
- Composer: Hirofumi Taniguchi
- Platform: Wii
- Release: JP: August 28, 2008
- Genre: Action-adventure
- Mode: Single-player

Captain Rainbow (Note: Japanese: キャプテン レインボー, Hepburn: Kyaputen Reinbō) is an action-adventure video game developed by Skip Ltd. and published by Nintendo for the Wii. The game was released exclusively in Japan and Taiwan on August 28, 2008.

The game puts players in the role of Nick, an ordinary guy, whose alter ego "Captain Rainbow" was once a popular TV superhero. In order to regain his popularity, Nick travels to Mimin Island, a place where dreams are said to come true. Captain Rainbow is an action-adventure game that involves making friends with the other island residents (who are all lesser-known Nintendo characters), collecting "Kirarin" crystals, and granting their wishes.

The game never released outside of Japan and Taiwan, but an English release was mentioned by Nintendo of Europe in Summer 2009.

== Plot ==
The game's storyline follows Nick, who is able to transform into "Captain Rainbow", a yo-yo-wielding, tokusatsu-styled superhero that stars in his own TV show, but is no longer popular. To restore his popularity, Nick ventures to Mimin Island, an island where wishes are said to come true. Nick meets a vast array of past, minor Nintendo characters with their own dreams and wishes on his journey, such as Hikari from Shin Onigashima.

== Gameplay ==
Captain Rainbow is an action-adventure game with gameplay divided into two parts. The adventure part of the game is set on enjoying the life on the island together with its other residents. Nick can go fishing, bug catching, and help the other islanders with their requests. Most of the requests can lead to various minigames, such as boxing, volleyball, fishing, and golf. Helping islanders would grant the player special, star-shaped crystals known as "Kirarin" ("Sparklies"). The action part of Captain Rainbow is based around those crystals. Each time 20 Kirarin are collected, a star would fall from the sky. The star could be carried to an altar at the top of the island where it would grant a wish. While carrying the star to the altar Nick is challenged by a mysterious Shadow who for unknown reasons wants the star for himself. If Nick succeeds in bringing the star to the altar there would be two choices left for him. He can either grant his own wish to become a popular hero again or grant the wish of one of the islanders and go back to finding other Kirarin.

== Reception ==
The four reviewers of Weekly Famitsu magazine scored Captain Rainbow a total of 31 out of 40. The panel was overall impressed by the game's writing and characters, especially due to the day and night cycles. They also enjoyed the gameplay, music, and tempo, but found the humor to be often vulgar.

Captain Rainbow was a financial disappointment. According to Media Create, the game only sold a scant 6,361 copies during its first week of release. A total of 22,682 copies were sold in Japan in 2008.
