= Genyo Takeda =

Japanese video game designer (born 1949)

- 竹田 玄洋
- Born: March 7, 1949 (age 77); Osaka, Japan
- Education: Shizuoka University
- Years active: 1972–2017
- Employer: Nintendo

Genyo Takeda (竹田 玄洋, Takeda Gen'yō; born March 7, 1949) is a former Japanese game designer and executive who worked for the video game company Nintendo. Takeda was formerly the general manager of Nintendo's Integrated Research & Development division, and was the co-representative director and "Technology Fellow" of the company until his retirement in 2017.

He joined Nintendo in 1972, and was promoted to his best-known position when the Integrated Research & Development (IRD) division was founded in 1981. At IRD, he mostly worked on improving hardware for home consoles and handhelds, but sometimes developed video games. In software development, he is notable for creating the Punch-Out!! and StarTropics franchises. He also designed Nintendo's first arcade game, EVR Race, in 1975. In September 2015, Takeda was promoted to co-representative director and given the title of "Technology Fellow" during the company wide executive shuffle following the death of former company president Satoru Iwata.

== Biography and professional history ==
Takeda was born in Osaka, Japan on March 7, 1949. During his childhood, Takeda enjoyed working with his hands, building small items such as miniature trains and airplanes. He attended Shizuoka Government University in Honshū, where he studied semiconductors. After his graduation in 1971, he was hired by Nintendo after Takeda responded to a newspaper ad. He was interviewed and subsequently hired by Gunpei Yokoi. Takeda worked alongside Masayuki Uemura in Nintendo's R&D2 team developing what they termed 'an electronic shooting range'.

After a year at R&D2, Takeda was assigned control as the general manager over Nintendo's fledgling R&D3 department. By far the smallest of the R&D departments at Nintendo with about 20 employees, R&D3's primary responsibilities were technical hardware design and development software for both arcade systems and later home consoles. The team also helped create bank switching and the MMC chipsets in cartridges. R&D3 also made forays into video game software development, producing famous titles such as the Punch-Out!! and StarTropics series of games. R&D3 was also responsible for releasing a series of sports games for Nintendo, including Pro Wrestling, NES Play Action Football, and Ice Hockey. These titles were aimed primarily at the American market, where they sold well.

A major limitation with the NES cartridges was the inability to save directly on the cartridge. The cartridges contained RAM, which were easily writable, but would lose all of stored memory as soon as the power was turned off. Takeda was credited for his team’s development of the battery back-up memory, which was first used in the North American and European versions of The Legend of Zelda. It supplied a long-life power source to the RAM chip, maintaining the saved data, even when the main power supply is deactivated or the cartridge is removed. Takeda was also credited with the invention of the Analog controller for the Nintendo 64 system, a style which has since been copied by Microsoft and Sony for their respective systems. Takeda's R&D3 team was renamed Integrated Research and Development in 2000. In that same year, they worked with Conexant to create broadband and modem peripherals for the Nintendo GameCube. Takeda was promoted in 2002 to senior management director, while still maintaining his position as general manager.

Following the death of Nintendo president Satoru Iwata on July 11, 2015, Takeda was appointed as acting Representative Director of Nintendo alongside Shigeru Miyamoto, effective on July 13. He was relieved of this position on September 16, when Tatsumi Kimishima was inaugurated as the fifth president of Nintendo the previous day. He was also appointed the position of "Technology Fellow" at that time, providing expert advice to Kimishima as a "support network", alongside Miyamoto.

Takeda was given the Lifetime Achievement Award at the 21st Annual D.I.C.E. Awards in February 2018 for his contributions and leadership in Nintendo's hardware development.

== Development of the Wii ==
Takeda was one of the lead developers on the Wii console. He was known for disagreement with the contemporary model of adding every technical and graphical improvements to create new console generations. He claims that such a model is subject to diminishing returns. He has been quoted as saying that "If [Nintendo] had followed existing roadmaps we would have aimed to make [the Wii] faster and flashier. We'd have tried to improve the speed at which it displays stunning graphics. But we could not help but ask, 'How big an impact would that really have on our customers?' In development, we came to realize the sheer inefficiency of this path when we compared the hardships and costs of development against the new experiences customers might have." Takeda began to have doubts about following this model as early as 2002. He claims to have figured out that consumers will not be satisfied with graphics at any point, that the new improvement effects will eventually wear off, and that "there is no end to the desire of those who just want more. Give them one, they ask for two. Give them two and the next time they will ask for five instead of three, their desire growing exponentially."

He has famously compared the console industry to the automobile industry. Noticing that not all cars are built to compete at the highest level of racing, he points out that there are lucrative markets for the most fuel-efficient, family-friendly vehicles as well. Takeda meant for the Wii to parallel this model, and has mentioned in an interview that one of his major technical goals on the Wii was to scale back the power necessary to operate the console while maintaining the same high performance. He compared the Wii to a hybrid vehicle for its mass appeal and conservation attributes.

== Ludography ==
| Name | Year | Platform | Credited with |
|---|---|---|---|
| EVR Race | 1975 | Arcade | Producer |
| Sheriff | 1979 | Arcade | Producer |
| Space Firebird | 1980 | Arcade | Producer |
| Sky Skipper | 1981 | Arcade | Designer |
| Popeye | 1982 | Arcade | Producer |
| Punch-Out!! | 1984 | Arcade | Producer |
| Super Punch-Out!! | 1984 | Arcade | Producer |
| Arm Wrestling | 1985 | Arcade | Producer |
| Punch-Out!! | 1987 | NES | Director |
| StarTropics | 1990 | NES | Director, producer, writer |
| Zoda's Revenge: StarTropics II | 1994 | NES | Director, producer |
| Super Punch-Out!! | 1994 | SNES | Producer |
| Donkey Kong Country | 1994 | SNES | Special thanks |
| Pilotwings 64 | 1996 | Nintendo 64 | Producer |
| Killer Instinct Gold | 1996 | Nintendo 64 | Special thanks |
| Pokémon Puzzle League | 2000 | Nintendo 64 | Producer |
| Dr. Mario 64 | 2001 | Nintendo 64 | Producer |
| Punch-Out!! | 2009 | Wii | Supervisor |
