= Punch-Out!! (1987 video game) =

Boxing video game

- Original North American box artwork featuring Mike Tyson
- Developer: Nintendo R&D3
- Publisher: Nintendo
- Director: Genyo Takeda
- Producer: Minoru Arakawa
- Designers: Kazuo Yoneyama; Mayumi Hirota
- Programmer: Masato Hatakeyama
- Artist: Makoto Wada
- Composers: Yukio Kaneoka; Akito Nakatsuka; Kenji Yamamoto
- Series: Punch-Out!!
- Platform: Nintendo Entertainment System
- Release: Punch-Out!!: Shouhin-ban; JP: September 18, 1987; Mike Tyson's Punch-Out!!; NA: October 1987; JP: November 21, 1987; EU: December 15, 1987; Punch-Out!!; NA: August 1990; EU: 1990
- Genre: Sports
- Mode: Single-player
- Arcade system: PlayChoice-10

Punch-Out!!, (Note: Japanese: パンチアウト!!, Hepburn: Panchi-Auto!!) originally titled Mike Tyson's Punch-Out!!, (Note: Japanese: マイクタイソン・パンチアウト!!, Hepburn: Maiku Taison Panchi-Auto!!) is a 1987 boxing video game developed and published by Nintendo for the Nintendo Entertainment System (NES). Part of the Punch-Out!! series, it is an adaptation of the arcade video games Punch-Out!! (1984) and Super Punch-Out!! (1984). Differences from the arcades include the addition of former undisputed world heavyweight champion Mike Tyson as the final boss. It received critical acclaim, and is retrospectively considered one of the greatest video games of all time.

== Gameplay ==
Little Mac has punched at the right time to defend himself against Bald Bull's "Bull Charge", instantly knocking his opponent down.

Punch-Out!! features Little Mac, a young boxer fighting his way up through ranks of the World Video Boxing Association. After facing a series of colorful fictional opponents in three circuits and winning the championship in each, Little Mac enters a final "Dream Fight" against a highly skilled boxer. In the gold prize version, the final boss is Super Macho Man, who was also the final opponent in Super Punch-Out!!. Mike Tyson's Punch-Out!! features Mike Tyson, the real-life undisputed World Heavyweight boxing Champion at the time. After the license to use Tyson's likeness expired in 1990, he was replaced by the fictional Mr. Dream in later releases of the game.

Little Mac has a limited repertoire compared to most of his opponents. His punches are limited to left and right jabs, left and right body blows, and a powerful uppercut. The uppercut can only be used once the player earns a star, which is typically accomplished by counter-punching the opponent directly before or after certain attacks are launched. The player can acquire up to three stars, but loses them whenever Mac is hit or knocked down. To defend, Mac can dodge left or right, duck, and block punches by putting up his guard.

Little Mac has a heart counter, which decreases upon being hit, blocking a punch, or throwing a punch that the opponent dodges or blocks. When the counter decreases to zero, Little Mac temporarily turns different shades of pink and appears tired/exhausted, leaving the player unable to attack but still able to dodge, duck, and block. At this point, Mac can regain some hearts and his normal color palette only by avoiding the opponent's punches. He immediately loses all of his hearts upon being knocked down, but can regain some by getting up.

A bout can end by knockout (KO), if a fighter is unable to get up within ten seconds after being knocked down; by technical knockout (TKO), if a fighter is knocked down three times in one round; or by decision, if the bout lasts three full rounds without a clear winner. In order to win by decision, the player must accumulate a certain point total by punching the opponent. Some bouts cannot be won in this manner and will automatically result in a loss for the player if the opponent is not knocked out. Mac can only get up three times during any one bout; if he is knocked down a fourth time, he will be unable to rise and thus lose by knockout.

When Mac loses his first bout to a ranked opponent, he will have a chance to fight a rematch. However, if he loses a Title Bout, he will fall in the rankings – one place for the Minor or Major Circuits, two places for the World Circuit. Losing a rematch causes him to fall one place (unless he is already at the bottom of his circuit), forcing him to fight his way back up. A third loss, or a loss in the Dream Fight, ends the game.

=== Characters ===
Little Mac faces a total of 14 opponents: three in the Minor Circuit, four in the Major Circuit, six in the World Circuit, and Mike Tyson or Mr. Dream. All character sprites except King Hippo are reused for two characters each, with changes made to colors, head, or special moves. Mario has a cameo as the referee. Three opponents from the Minor and Major Circuits reappear in the World Circuit, with new attacks that force the player to devise a new strategy.

== Development ==
Punch-Out!! was developed by Nintendo Research & Development No. 3. Genyo Takeda (the producer of the Punch-Out!! arcade games), was the director of the NES game. Because the NES was not as powerful as the arcade hardware, they could not recreate the arcade graphics. Instead of making the playable boxer wire-framed or transparent in order to see the opponent, they made the playable boxer smaller and named him Little Mac, a 17-year-old boxer weighing about 107 pounds. The behavior of each opposing boxer follows a set pattern requiring trial and error and memorization to defeat them.

=== Music ===
The opening and closing/"credits" music for Punch Out!! is "Look Sharp-Be Sharp", composed by Mahlon Merrick for the 1942–1960 radio and television program Gillette Cavalcade of Sports. All opponents except Bald Bull, Mr. Sandman, and Mike Tyson / Mr. Dream have ring-entrance music. Most instances are a classical or folk theme, usually from the fighter's country of origin: Glass Joe has the French national anthem, "La Marseillaise"; Von Kaiser, Great Tiger, and Super Macho Man, the latter two possibly due to code reuse, have Richard Wagner's "Ride of the Valkyries"; Piston Honda has Japanese folk song "Sakura"; Don Flamenco has a portion of "March of the Toreadors" from Georges Bizet's opera Carmen; and Soda Popinski has Russian folk song "The Song of the Volga Boatmen".

== Release ==
=== Punch-Out!!: Shouhin-ban ===
Before the public release of Mike Tyson's Punch-Out!!, Nintendo released it in a gold-colored Famicom cartridge titled Punch-Out!!: Shouhin-ban, (Note: パンチアウト!! 賞品版, Panchi-Auto!! Shōhin-ban) in Japan, without Mike Tyson, as a prize for participating in the Famicom Disk System's Family Computer Golf: U.S. Course tournament held in September 1987. 10,000 units were produced—half were given as high score prizes, and the rest were given as a lottery prize. Its final opponent is Super Macho Man, who is also the final opponent in the arcade game Super Punch-Out!!.

=== Mike Tyson's Punch-Out!! ===
Nintendo of America's founder and former president Minoru Arakawa attended a boxing match during the Heavyweight unification series that featured its future champion Mike Tyson. Arakawa became so astonished with the athlete's "power and skill" that he was inspired to use his likeness and the tournament itself in the upcoming game. Tyson was rumored to have been paid $50,000 for a three-year period for his likeness. This transaction was something of a risk for Nintendo, as it occurred before Tyson won the World Boxing Council (WBC) heavyweight championship from Trevor Berbick on November 22, 1986, which greatly increased the profit for the game. Nintendo would release the Mike Tyson version of Punch-Out!! in Japan soon after its North American release.

=== Punch-Out!! ===
Re-release box art featuring Mr. Dream

Mike Tyson's Punch-Out!! was rebranded to simply Punch-Out!!, and re-released in the U.S. and Europe in 1990 and 1991, respectively. When Nintendo's license had expired with Mike Tyson, his likeness was replaced by a fictional character named Mr. Dream. This version of the game was used in all major re-releases, including the Virtual Console, Animal Crossing for GameCube, the NES Classic Edition, and on the Nintendo Classics service (which Mike Tyson humorously contested).

== Reception ==
Reception

Review scores
Publication	Score	
Publication	NES	Wii
ACE	920/1000	
Computer and Video Games	94%	
GameSpot		8/10
Génération 4	90%	
Mean Machines	8/10	

More than 2 million copies of Mike Tyson's Punch-Out!! were sold in North America by 1988. It is one of two NES games to reach this sales milestone that year, along with The Legend of Zelda.

Punch-Out!! was well received by critics. In 1989, Computer and Video Games magazine said the NES version of "the great boxing arcade game" had "big, brilliantly drawn and animated sprites, a brilliant control method and utterly superlative gameplay", making it "definitely THE best boxing game available on any machine". ACE magazine in 1989 listed it as the second highest-rated NES game, after Super Mario Bros. They stated it bashes "the proverbial s@*t out of any other home boxing game on any other console or computer" and it proves "that even if Nintendo's hardware may be technologically naff, they can still squeeze an excellent game onto a cartridge".

A GameSpot reader poll ranked it as the 6th greatest NES game. Nintendo Power magazine ranked it as the 17th best game for a Nintendo system in its Top 200 Games list. In August 2008, Nintendo Power listed it as the sixth best NES game, praising it for putting arcade-style fun over realism. Historian Steve L. Kent called it the second major game of 1987. Author Nathan Lockard cited the graphics, violence, controls, and the variety for making it a "true classic" and one of the best NES games. In 2005, Punch-Out!! is on GameSpot's list of the greatest games of all time. Editor Shawn Laib of Den of Geek ranked it 7th out of the 15 Best NES Games of All Time, and Esquire's Dom Nero and Cameron Sherrill ranked it fifth.

GamesRadar ranked it the 11th best NES game ever made, calling it a "brilliant puzzle game [disguised] as a sports game". Game Informer ranked Mike Tyson's Punch-Out!! as its 14th favorite game ever in 2001. The staff noted that no boxing game since has been as "beloved". IGN named it the 7th best NES game. Official Nintendo Magazine ranked the game 74th in a list of greatest Nintendo games.

== In media ==
On The Tonight Show on October 29, 2014, Mike Tyson was challenged by host Jimmy Fallon to play the game on live TV. The virtual Tyson defeated the real Tyson in the first round by TKO.

While interrogating a murder suspect in Brooklyn Nine-Nine's Season 5 episode "The Box", Detective Jake Peralta laments the difficulty of beating the Punch-Out!! character Great Tiger as he teleports around the ring. To which the accused confidently asserts, "I beat him every time. You just punch him when he gets dizzy."

In Family Guy's Season 7 episode "Not All Dogs Go to Heaven", during a family grace, Peter asks God for the "cheat codes for Mike Tyson's Punch-Out", saying he has "been stuck on Bald Bull for 4 years".
