= List of Nintendo arcade video games =

Nintendo is a Japanese multinational video game company headquartered in Kyoto. It develops, publishes, and manufactures both video games and video game consoles. Nintendo originally entered the video game market through arcade games, which initially was not successful until the release of Donkey Kong, which cemented their place in the industry. Nintendo slowly left the arcade market starting in the 1990s, but would still occasionally release arcades through other companies.

== Arcade products ==
=== Arcade video games ===
Licenses owned or co-owned by Nintendo
Title	Developer(s)	Release date			Ref.
Title	Developer(s)	JP	NA	PAL	Ref.
Computer Othello	Nintendo R&D1, Ikegami Tsushinki	June 1978	Unreleased	Unreleased	
Block Fever	Nintendo R&D1, Ikegami Tsushinki	November 1978	Unreleased	Unreleased	
Space Fever (Note: Published by Far East Video in North America.)	Nintendo R&D1, Ikegami Tsushinki	February 1979	1980	Unreleased	
Color Space Fever	Nintendo R&D1, Ikegami Tsushinki	June 1979	1980	Unreleased	
SF-HiSplitter	Nintendo R&D1, Ikegami Tsushinki	August 1979	Unreleased	Unreleased	
Monkey Magic	Nintendo R&D1, Ikegami Tsushinki	August 1979	Unreleased	Unreleased	
Sheriff (Note: Published in North America first by Sega and later by Exidy under the name Bandido (removing all references to Nintendo) and in Europe by Sega/Bell-Fruit Mfg. A modified version of the game was released by Taito in 1980 under the name Western Gun Part II, also without any Nintendo references.)	Nintendo R&D1, Ikegami Tsushinki	October 1979	November 1979	1979	
Space Launcher	Nintendo R&D1, Ikegami Tsushinki	November 1979	1980	Unreleased	
Space Firebird (Note: Published by Far East Video and Sega/Gremlin in North America.)	Nintendo R&D1, Ikegami Tsushinki	July 1980	October 1980	1980	
Heli Fire	Nintendo R&D1, Ikegami Tsushinki	September 1980	November 1980	Unreleased	
Radar Scope	Nintendo R&D1, Ikegami Tsushinki	October 8, 1980	December 1980	1980	
Donkey Kong	Nintendo R&D1, Ikegami Tsushinki	July 9, 1981	October 1981	November 1981	
Sky Skipper (Note: Only saw a limited release in Japan. Released worldwide only with the Arcade Archives version on Nintendo Switch.)	Nintendo R&D1, Ikegami Tsushinki	July 1981	Arcade Archives only	Arcade Archives only	
Donkey Kong Jr.	Nintendo R&D1	August 2, 1982	August 1982	Late 1982	
Popeye	Nintendo R&D1, Ikegami Tsushinki	December 1982	18 November 1982	November 1982	
Mario Bros.	Nintendo R&D1	June 21, 1983 (Note: Sources for the Japanese release date are conflicting and list it as somewhere between June and July 1983.)	July 20, 1983	1983	
Donkey Kong 3	Nintendo R&D1	October 21, 1983	October 1983	Late 1983	
Punch-Out!!	Nintendo R&D3	February 17, 1984	March 1984	July 1984	
Super Punch-Out!!	Nintendo R&D3	September 1984	October 1984	Arcade Archives only	
Arm Wrestling	Nintendo R&D3	Unreleased	November 1985	Unreleased	

Licensed to Nintendo (Worldwide)
Title	Developer(s)	Licensor(s)	Release date	Ref.
Title	Developer(s)	Licensor(s)	JP	Ref.
Licensed clones
Head On N	Nintendo	Sega	November 1979	
Third-party games in Nintendo arcade cabinets
Bomb Bee N	Namco	Namco	November 1979	
Cutie Q	Namco	Namco	November 1979	
Galaxian	Namco	Namco	1979	
Head On Part II	Sega/Gremlin	Sega	1979	

Licensed to Nintendo (original release published by another company)
North America only
Title	Licensor(s)	Release date	Ref.
Title	Licensor(s)	NA	Ref.
R-Type	Irem	October 1987	

=== Nintendo VS. System ===
Licenses owned or co-owned by Nintendo
Title	Developer(s)	Release date		Ref.
Title	Developer(s)	JP	NA	Ref.
VS. Tennis	Nintendo R&D1, Intelligent Systems	January 18, 1984	March 1984	
VS. Mah-Jong	Nintendo R&D1	February 1984	Arcade Archives only	
VS. Baseball	Nintendo R&D1	May 1, 1984	April 1984	
VS. Duck Hunt	Nintendo R&D1, Intelligent Systems	Unreleased	April 1984	
VS. Golf	Nintendo R&D2, HAL Laboratory	July 26, 1984	October 1984	
VS. Wrecking Crew	Nintendo R&D1	July 26, 1984	September 1984	
VS. Pinball	Nintendo R&D1, HAL Laboratory	July 26, 1984	October 1984	
VS. Balloon Fight	Nintendo R&D1, HAL Laboratory	October 3, 1984	September 1984	
VS. Clu Clu Land	Nintendo R&D1	December 7, 1984	Unreleased	
VS. Excitebike	Nintendo R&D4	December 7, 1984	March 1985	
VS. Urban Champion	Nintendo R&D1	December 10, 1984	January 1985	
VS. Ladies Golf	Nintendo R&D2, HAL Laboratory	Unreleased	December 14, 1984	
VS. Ice Climber	Nintendo R&D1	February 4, 1985	March 1985	
VS. Hogan's Alley	Nintendo R&D1, Intelligent Systems	Unreleased	March 1, 1985	
VS. Mach Rider	HAL Laboratory	August 1985	January 1986	
VS. Soccer	Intelligent Systems	December 10, 1985	November 1985	
VS. Super Mario Bros.	Nintendo R&D4	Unreleased	February 1986	
VS. Gumshoe	Nintendo R&D1	Unreleased	May 1986	
VS. Dr. Mario	Nintendo R&D1	Unreleased	August 1990	

Licensed to Nintendo (Worldwide)
Title	Developer(s)	Licensor(s)	Release date		Ref.
Title	Developer(s)	Licensor(s)	JP	NA	Ref.
VS. Raid on Bungeling Bay	Hudson Soft	Broderbund Software, Inc.	April 1985	Unreleased	
VS. Slalom	Rare	Rare	Unreleased	October 17, 1986	
VS. Gradius	Konami	Konami	Unreleased	November 1986	
VS. The Goonies	Konami	Konami	Unreleased	November 1986	
VS. Castlevania	Konami	Konami	Unreleased	April 1987	
VS. Freedom Force	Sunsoft	Sunsoft	Unreleased	March 1988	

=== PlayChoice-10 ===
Licenses owned or co-owned by Nintendo
Title	Developer(s)	Release date	Ref.
Title	Developer(s)	NA	Ref.
Balloon Fight	Nintendo R&D1, HAL Laboratory	August 1986	
Baseball	Nintendo R&D1	August 1986	
Duck Hunt	Nintendo R&D1, Intelligent Systems	August 1986	
Excitebike	Nintendo R&D4	August 1986	
Golf	Nintendo R&D2, HAL Laboratory	August 1986	
Hogan's Alley	Nintendo R&D1, Intelligent Systems	August 1986	
Mario Bros.	Nintendo R&D2, Intelligent Systems	August 1986	
Super Mario Bros.	Nintendo R&D4	August 1986	
Tennis	Nintendo R&D1, Intelligent Systems	August 1986	
Wild Gunman	Nintendo R&D1, Intelligent Systems	August 1986	
Volleyball	Nintendo R&D3, Pax Softnica	December 1986	
Metroid	Nintendo R&D1, Intelligent Systems	July 1987	
Pro Wrestling	Nintendo R&D3	December 1987	
Kung Fu	Nintendo R&D4	March 11, 1988 (Note: Presented at the American Coin Machine Exposition (ACME '88), held in Reno, Nevada, from March 11 to 13, 1988.)	
Mike Tyson's Punch-Out!!	Nintendo R&D3	January 1989	
Super Mario Bros. 2	Nintendo R&D4	January 1989	
Super Mario Bros. 3	Nintendo R&D4	July 15, 1989 (Note: Presented at the Seaside Fete, Nintendo's distributor conference, held in Laguna Niguel, California, on July 15, 1989.)	
Dr. Mario (Note: Origonally released under the name Virus on the PlayChoice-10 before the final game was finished.)	Nintendo R&D1	July 19, 1990 (Note: Presented at Nintendo's Seventh Annual Distributor Meeting, held July 19–22 at the Le Méridien on Coronado Island, San Diego, California.)	
Mario's Open Golf	Nintendo R&D2, HAL Laboratory	March 1992	

Licensed to Nintendo (Worldwide)
Title	Developer(s)	Licensor(s)	Release date	Ref.
Title	Developer(s)	Licensor(s)	NA	Ref.
Gradius	Konami	Konami	November 1986	
Castlevania	Konami	Konami	April 1987	
1942	Capcom, Micronics	Capcom	July 1987	
Rush'n Attack	Konami	Konami	July 1987	
Track and Field	Konami	Konami	July 1987	
Trojan	Capcom	Capcom	July 1987	
Double Dribble	Konami	Konami	November 5, 1987 (Note: Presented at AMOA Expo '87, held November 5–7, 1987, at Chicago.)	
Rad Racer	Square	Square	November 5, 1987	
The Goonies	Konami	Konami	1987	
R.C. Pro-Am	Rare	Rare	1987	
Rygar	Tecmo	Tecmo	1987	
Contra	Konami	Konami	March 11, 1988	
Double Dragon	Technos Japan	Technos Japan	March 11, 1988	
Gauntlet	Tengen	Tengen	March 11, 1988	
Fester's Quest	Sunsoft	Sunsoft	July 15, 1989	
Ninja Gaiden	Tecmo	Tecmo	July 15, 1989	
Pin Bot	Rare	Rare, Williams Electronics	July 15, 1989	
Tecmo Bowl	Tecmo	Tecmo	July 15, 1989	
Teenage Mutant Ninja Turtles	Konami	Konami	July 15, 1989	
Baseball Stars: Be a Champ!	SNK	SNK	1989	
Ninja Gaiden II: The Dark Sword of Chaos	Tecmo	Tecmo	March 9, 1990 (Note: Presented at the American Coin Machine Exposition (ACME '90), held in Chicago, Illinois, from March 9 to 11, 1990.)	
Captain Skyhawk	Rare	Milton Bradley Company	July 19, 1990	
Nintendo World Cup	Technos Japan	Technos Japan	July 19, 1990	
Rad Racer II	Square	Square	July 19, 1990	
Yo! Noid	Now Production	Capcom	July 19, 1990	
Chip 'n Dale: Rescue Rangers	Capcom	Capcom	August 1990	
Super C	Konami	Konami	August 1990	
Mega Man 3	Capcom	Capcom	October 25, 1990 (Note: Presented at AMOA Expo '90, held October 25–27, 1990, at the New Orleans Convention Center.)	
Solar Jetman	Rare, Zippo Games	Tradewest	October 25, 1990	
Teenage Mutant Ninja Turtles II: The Arcade Game	Konami	Konami	October 25, 1990	
Shatterhand	Natsume Inc.	Jaleco	1991	
Power Blade	Taito Corporation, Natsume Inc.	Taito Corporation	March 1992	
Rockin' Kats	Atlus	Atlus	March 1992	
Ninja Gaiden III: The Ancient Ship of Doom	Tecmo	Tecmo	1992	

=== Nintendo Super System ===
Licenses owned or co-owned by Nintendo
Title	Developer(s)	Release date	Ref.
Title	Developer(s)	NA	Ref.
F-Zero	Nintendo EAD	September 1991	
Super Mario World	Nintendo EAD	September 1991	

Licensed to Nintendo (Worldwide)
Title	Developer(s)	Licensor(s)	Release date	Ref.
Title	Developer(s)	Licensor(s)	NA	Ref.
Super Tennis	Tose	Tonkin House	September 1991	
ActRaiser	Quintet	Enix	March 1992	
Super Soccer	Human Entertainment	Human Entertainment	March 1992	
The Addams Family	Ocean Software	Ocean Software	May 1992	
RoboCop 3	Ocean Software	Ocean Software	May 1992	
Contra III: The Alien Wars	Konami	Konami	1992	
David Crane's Amazing Tennis	Imagineering	Absolute Entertainment	1992	
The Irem Skins Game	Irem	Irem	1992	
Lethal Weapon	Ocean Software	Ocean Software	1992	
NCAA Basketball	Sculptured Software	HAL Laboratory	1992	
Push-Over	Red Rat Software	Ocean Software	1992	

== Developed but not published by Nintendo ==
Title	Platform(s)	Developer(s)	Publisher(s)	Release date (Japan)	Release date (North America)	Ref.						
Title	Platform(s)	Developer(s)	Publisher(s)	Release date (Japan)	Release date (North America)	Ref.	Space Demon	Arcade	Nintendo R&D1, Ikegami Tsushinki	Fortrek	Unreleased	1980

== Officially-licensed without direct Nintendo involvement ==
There have been several commercially released video games officially licensed to use Nintendo-owned intellectual properties without the company or one of its subsidiaries being involved in the game's production or distribution.

Title	Developer(s)	Publisher(s)	Release date			Ref.
Title	Developer(s)	Publisher(s)	JP	NA	PAL	Ref.
Fully Nintendo-Owned Licenses
Bandido (Note: Licensed clone of Sheriff.)	Exidy	Exidy	Unreleased	January 1980	Unreleased	
Western Gun Part II	Taito	Taito	1980	Unreleased	Unreleased	
Space Thunderbird (Note: Clone of Moon Cresta. Nintendo's involvement in this sequel to Space Firebird and Space Demon is unclear.)	Fortrek	Fortrek	Unreleased	1981	Unreleased	
Crazy Kong (Note: Licensed clone of Donkey Kong.)	Kyoei	Kyoei	1981	Unlicensed cabinets	Unlicensed cabinets	
Crazy Kong Part II	Falcon	Falcon	1981	Unlicensed cabinets	Unlicensed cabinets	
Terebi Denwa Super Mario World	Banpresto	Banpresto	1992	Unreleased	Unreleased	
Būbū Mario	Banpresto	Banpresto	1993	Unreleased	Unreleased	
Mario Undōkai	Banpresto	Banpresto	1993	Unreleased	Unreleased	
Cruis'n USA	TV Games Inc.	Midway Games	Unreleased	October 1994	October 1994	
F-Zero AX	Amusement Vision	Sega	June 2003	September 2003	2003	
Donkey Kong / Donkey Kong Junior / Mario Bros.	Cosmodog	Namco	Unreleased	November 2004	Unreleased	
Mario Kart Arcade GP	Namco	Namco	November 19, 2005	October 10, 2005	2005	
Mario Kart Arcade GP 2	Bandai Namco Games	Bandai Namco Games	March 14, 2007	March 12, 2008	July 10, 2007	
Rhythm Tengoku	Sega	Sega	September 20, 2007	Unreleased	Unreleased	
Mario Kart Arcade GP DX	Bandai Namco Amusement	Bandai Namco Amusement	July 25, 2013	2014	Early 2017	
Luigi's Mansion Arcade	Capcom	Capcom	June 2015	October 9, 2015	Unreleased	
Cruis'n Blast	Raw Thrills	Raw Thrills	Unreleased	January, 2017	November 2016	
Mario Kart Arcade GP VR	Bandai Namco Amusement	Bandai Namco Amusement	July 14, 2017	October 1, 2018	August 3, 2018	
Nintendo / Rare Co-Owned Licenses
Killer Instinct	Rare	Midway	Unreleased	October 28, 1994	1994	
Killer Instinct 2	Rare	Midway	Unreleased	January 1996	1996	
Nintendo / Midway Co-Owned Licenses
Cruis'n World	Midway Games	Midway Games	Unreleased	November 1996	November 1996	
Cruis'n Exotica	Midway Games	Midway Games	Unreleased	1999	July 24, 2000	
Nintendo / Creatures Inc. / Game Freak Co-Owned Licenses
Print Club Pokémon B	Sega	Sega	1999	1999	Unreleased	
Pocket Monsters Kureyon Kids	Sega	Banpresto	July 2001	Unreleased	Unreleased	
Pokémon BATTRIO	Takara Tomy, AQ Interactive	Takara Tomy	July 14, 2007	Unreleased	Unreleased	
Pokémon TRETTA	Takara Tomy, Marvelous AQL	Takara Tomy	July 14, 2012	Unreleased	Unreleased	
Pokémon Card Game Gacha	Takara Tomy	Takara Tomy	June 23, 2014	Unreleased	Unreleased	
Pokkén Tournament	Bandai Namco Studios	Bandai Namco Entertainment	July 16, 2015	September 24, 2015	Unreleased	
Pokémon Ga-Olé	Takara Tomy, Marvelous	Takara Tomy	July 7, 2016	Unreleased	Unreleased	
Pokémon MEZASTAR	Takara Tomy, Marvelous	Takara Tomy	September 17, 2020	Unreleased	Unreleased	
Pokémon FRIENDA	Takara Tomy, Marvelous	Takara Tomy	July 11, 2024	Unreleased	Unreleased	
Nintendo / Sega Co-Owned Licenses
Mario & Sonic at the Rio 2016 Olympic Games - Arcade Edition	Sega, Racjin	Sega	February 2016	June 2016	Unreleased	
Mario & Sonic at the Olympic Games Tokyo 2020 - Arcade Edition	Sega, Racjin	Sega	January 23, 2020	January 2021	January 2021	
