= Color TV-Game =

Video game console series by Nintendo

- Developer: Nintendo R&D2; Mitsubishi Electronics
- Manufacturer: Nintendo
- Type: Dedicated home video game consoles
- Generation: First
- Released: June 1, 1977: Color TV-Game 6; JP: June 1, 1977 Color TV-Game 15; JP: June 8, 1977 Color TV-Game Racing 112; JP: June 8, 1978 Color TV-Game Block Breaker; JP: April 23, 1979 Computer TV-Game; JP: December 12, 1980
- Lifespan: 1977–1983
- Discontinued: JP: 1983
- Units sold: 3 million
- Successor: Nintendo Entertainment System

The Color TV-Game (Note: Japanese: カラー テレビゲーム, Hepburn: Karā Terebi-Gēmu) is the first video game system ever made by Nintendo. The system was released as a series of five dedicated home video game consoles between 1977 and 1980 in Japan only. Nintendo sold three million units of the first four models: one million units of each of the first two models, Color TV-Game 6 and 15; and half a million units of each of the next two models, Block Breaker and Racing 112. The Color TV-Game series has the highest sales figures of all the first generation of video game consoles. Nintendo released a successor, the Family Computer, on July 15, 1983, ceasing production of the Color TV-Game series.

== History ==
=== Background ===
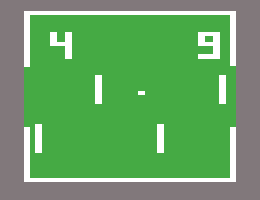
One of the games in Color TV-Game 6 and Color TV-Game 15

By the late 1970s, Nintendo began moving away from toys and playing cards and into the rapidly-growing video game market. This decision was based on the smash success of the arcade video game Space Invaders (1978) by Taito and the 1973 oil crisis making toys expensive to produce. Nintendo's first foray into video gaming was the arcade game Computer Othello in 1978. This was followed by games such as Sheriff, Space Fever, and EVR Race. Most of these were unsuccessful but made Nintendo view video games as its next major market. The home console market also rose in popularity, particularly in North America with the release of Atari's Pong system in 1972. The market was flooded with similar video tennis games as companies scrambled to cash in on its success. Nintendo made its own dedicated Pong system to import this popularity to Japan.

The Color TV-Game consoles were produced jointly by Nintendo Research & Development 2 (R&D2) and Mitsubishi Electronics. Nintendo had no prior experience in manufacturing electronics, and had previously contracted Mitsubishi for production of EVR Race, so this continued. For the first two consoles, Color TV-Game 6 and Color TV-Game 15, Nintendo acquired a license from Magnavox production of its own Pong clone game consoles. Magnavox created the original concept for Pong for its Magnavox Odyssey console, which inspired Atari to create a similar game for arcades. For this, Magnavox sued Atari and other Pong console manufacturers for copyright infringement. Nintendo president Hiroshi Yamauchi specified that the consoles be produced quickly and with cheaper parts to reduce production costs. He wanted a competitive edge by making the systems cheap for the consumer to purchase. The TV-Game 6 and 15 required little production time due to their simplicity. Mitsubishi made minor changes and corrections to the systems before they were released.

=== Color TV-Game 6 (1977) ===
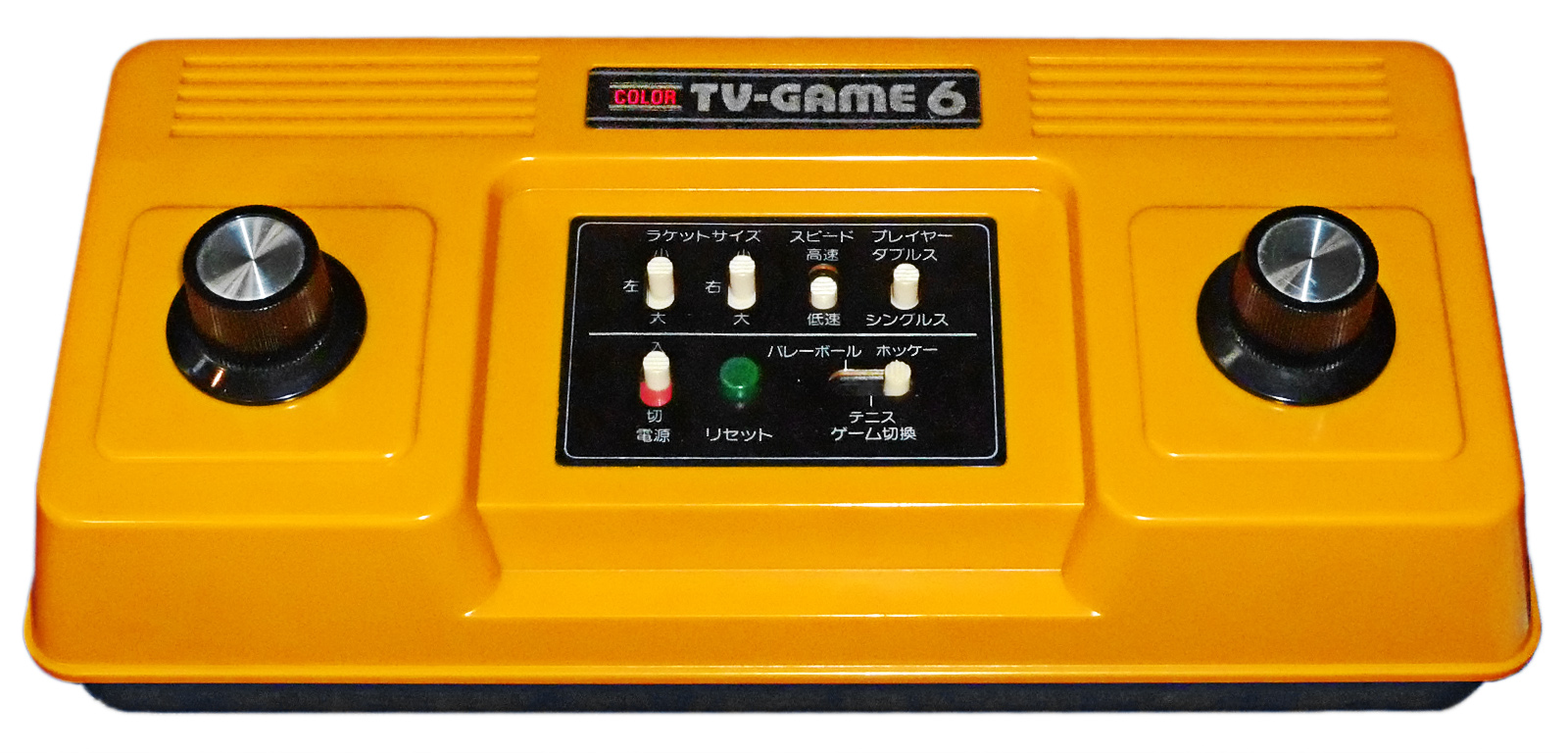
Color TV-Game 6

The Color TV-Game 6 was launched on June 1, 1977. It retailed at a price of ¥9,800, significantly lower than competing systems. Nintendo used this as a marketing tool. It contains six variations of Pong, such as adding additional paddles, decreasing the size of the paddles, and adding deflective shields in the center of the screen. It can be powered by batteries or by a power adapter sold separately. Shortly after its release, Nintendo released an improved version of the TV-Game 6, featuring a cream-white outer casing and removing the power adapter. A second variation was produced as part of a promotion with food company House Foods to promote its House Shanmen instant noodles. It is identical to the original TV-Game 6 but has the House Shanmen logo on the casing. This version was produced in very limited quantities, making it extremely rare. Sharp Electronics produced dark orange-colored versions of the TV-Game 6 to bundle with its television sets.

=== Color TV-Game 15 (1977) ===
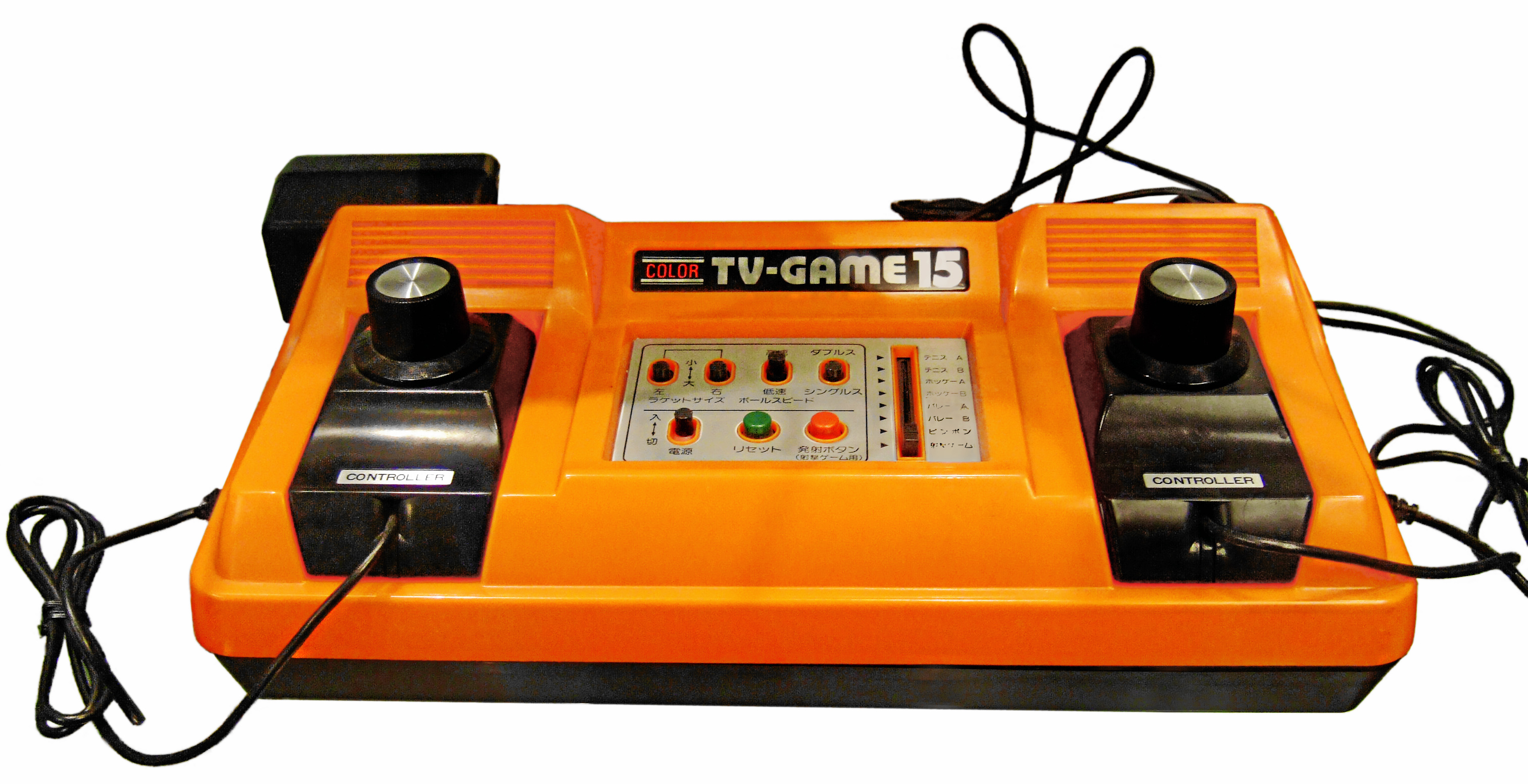
Color TV-Game 15

One week later on June 8, Nintendo released the Color TV-Game 15. It retailed for ¥15,000, roughly 50% more than the TV-Game 6. Essentially, the TV-Game 15 is an enhanced version of the TV-Game 6. Both consoles house the same fifteen games; however, only six are accessible on the TV-Game 6 without modification. The TV-Game 15 has detachable controllers which are stored in a small compartment on the system. Nintendo produced a second model of the TV-Game 15 with a reddish-orange casing, which had a longer production run and are more common. Sharp made a white-colored version that was renamed Color TV-Game XG-115.

=== Color TV-Game Racing 112 (1978) ===
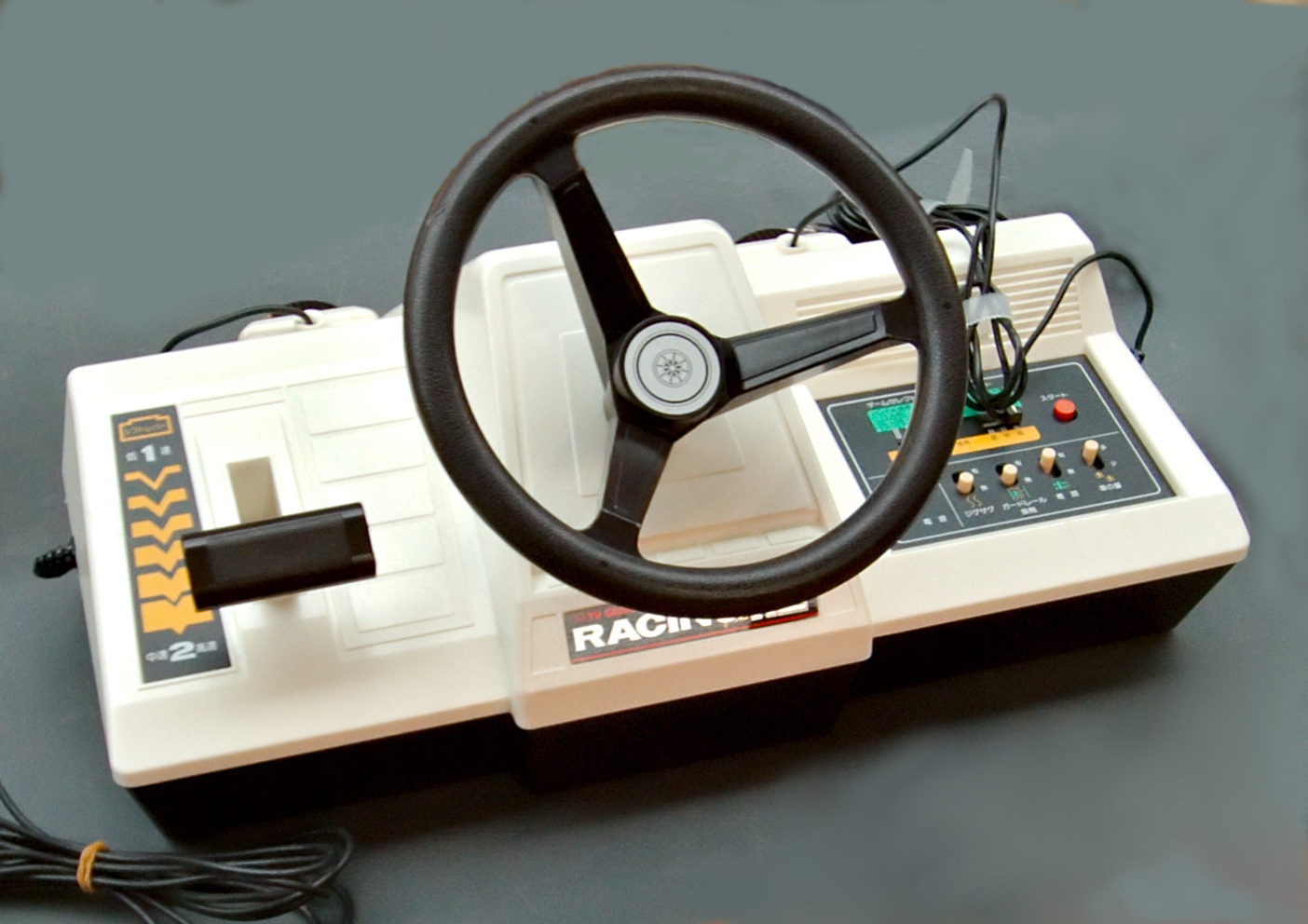
Color TV-Game Racing 112

The third unit, the Color TV Game Racing 112, was published on June 8, 1978. It is significantly larger than the previous two units, with a larger shipping box to accompany it. Racing 112 was set to be released at ¥18,000, but was lowered to ¥12,000 to ensure competitiveness. It was later reduced to ¥5,000. To prevent the machine from requiring a larger box, the wheel is detachable from the console. The built-in game is a top-down racer similar to Speed Race, an arcade game released by Taito in 1974. Variations include a smaller screen width and opponents that move faster, with all possible game combinations totaling to 112. The console also comes with two paddle controllers for multiplayer support.

=== Color TV-Game Block Kuzushi (1979) ===
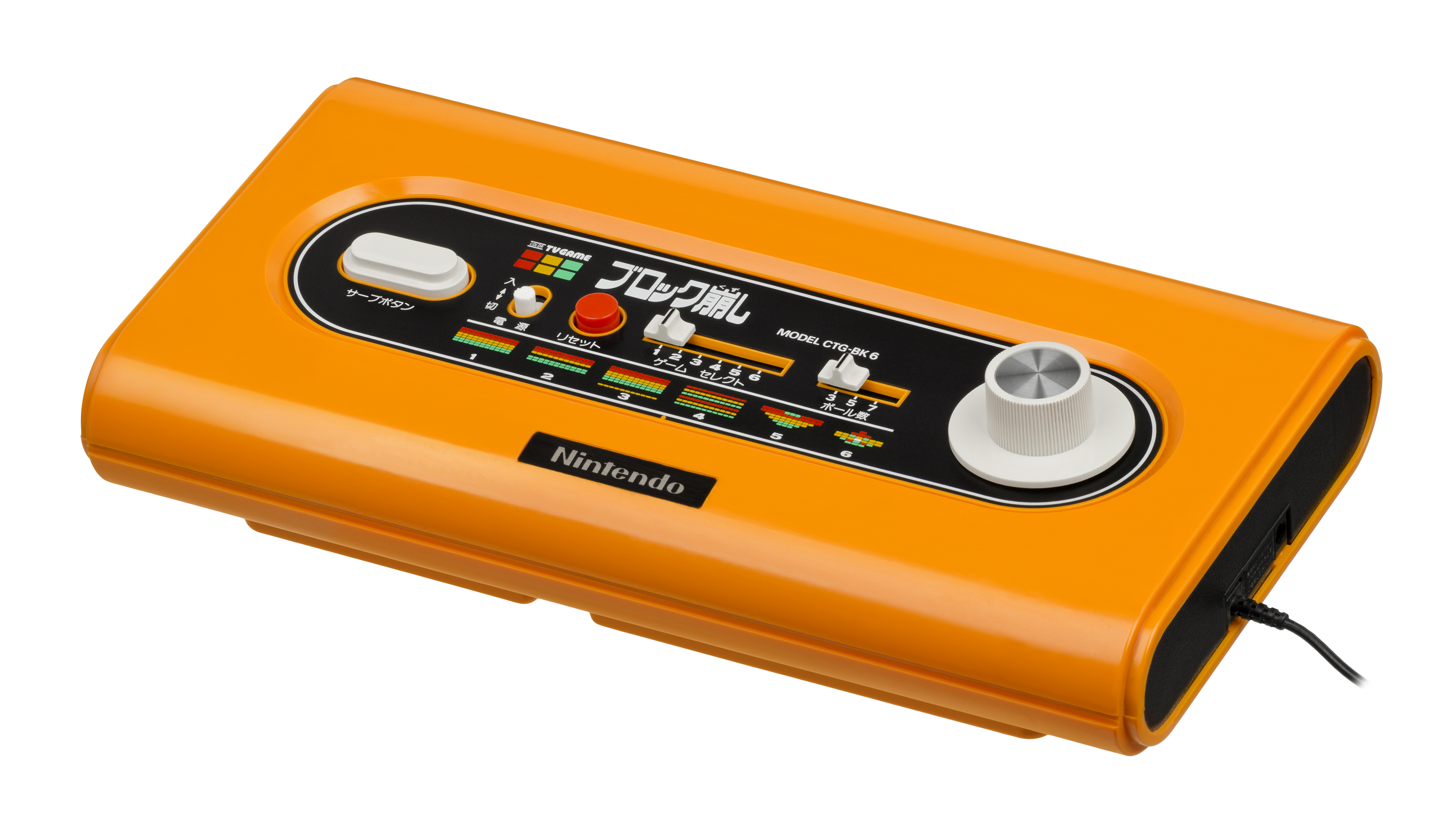
Color TV-Game Block Kuzushi

Color TV Game Block Kuzushi was released on April 23, 1979, at ¥13,500. The system was produced by Nintendo, allowing its name to be prominently displayed. Block Kuzushi includes six variations of Breakout, an arcade game released in America by Atari. Nintendo released a clone of Breakout titled Block Fever for Japanese arcades in 1978. Rival company Epoch released the TV Block console in Japan, which was successful and gave way to steady competition by other companies, including Nintendo. The system's casing was designed by future Mario creator Shigeru Miyamoto as one of his first video game projects after joining Nintendo in 1977. The built-in games for Racing 112 and Block Kuzushi were designed by Takehiro Izushi. Nintendo held competitions in department stores to promote the Block Kuzushi, where winners received a congratulatory note and a medal.

=== Computer TV-Game (1980) ===
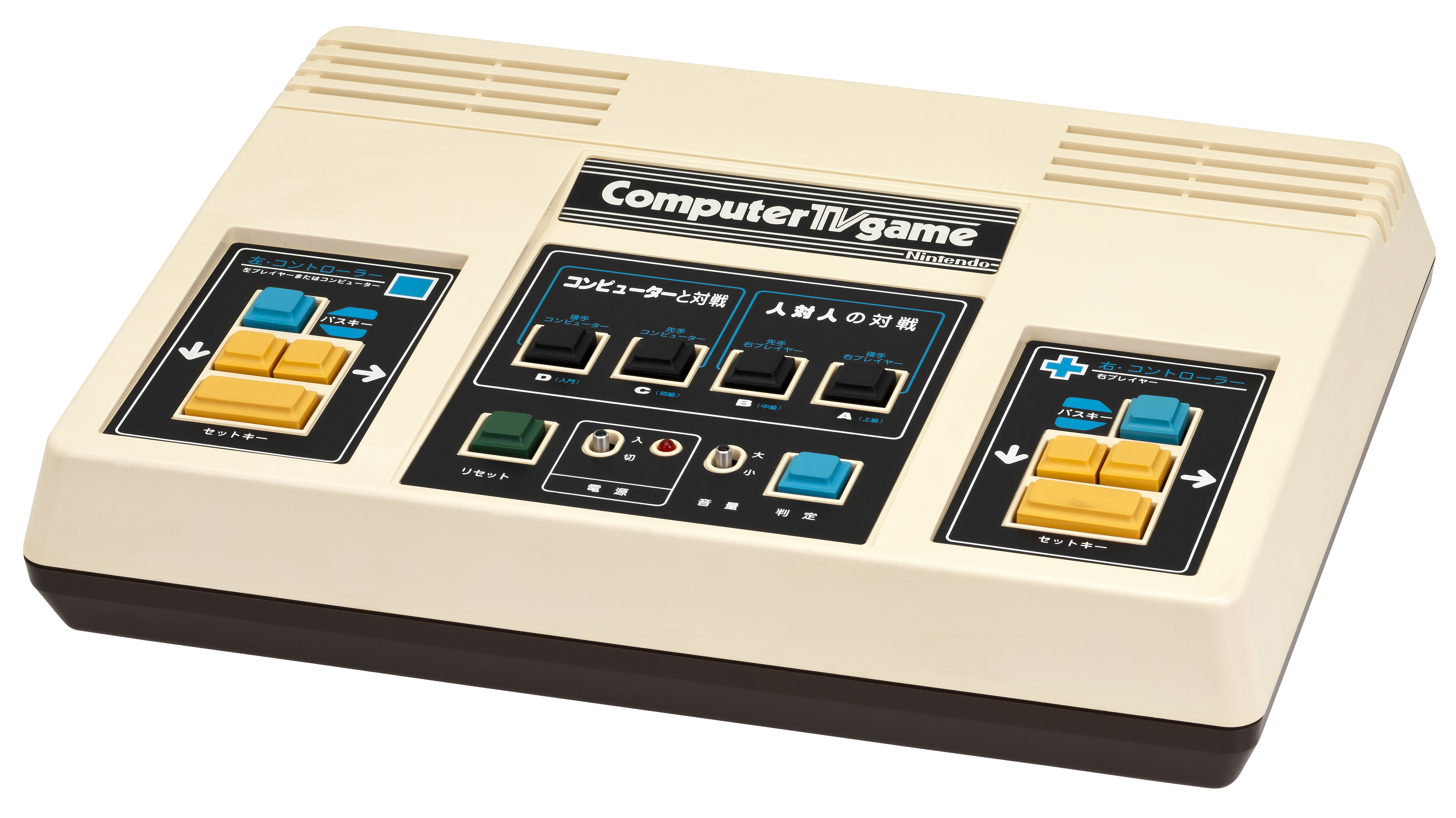
Computer TV-Game

The final console, the Computer TV-Game, was released on December 12, 1980. Because dedicated consoles were decreasing in popularity, the Computer TV-Game was only produced in limited quantities, making it extremely rare. Miyamoto again designed the system's white-colored casing and the packaging. It was produced internally. Computer TV-Game contains a version of Computer Othello, and is built around an original Computer Othello arcade system board. This makes it an arcade-perfect rendition, an uncommon sight during the early 1980s. The entire Color TV-Game series was discontinued in favor of the Family Computer in 1983, a cartridge-based system with a library of games that grew into the hundreds by the end of its life. Nintendo sold millions of the Famicom and its international counterpart, the Nintendo Entertainment System, and solidified the company's presence in the video game hardware market.

== Legacy ==
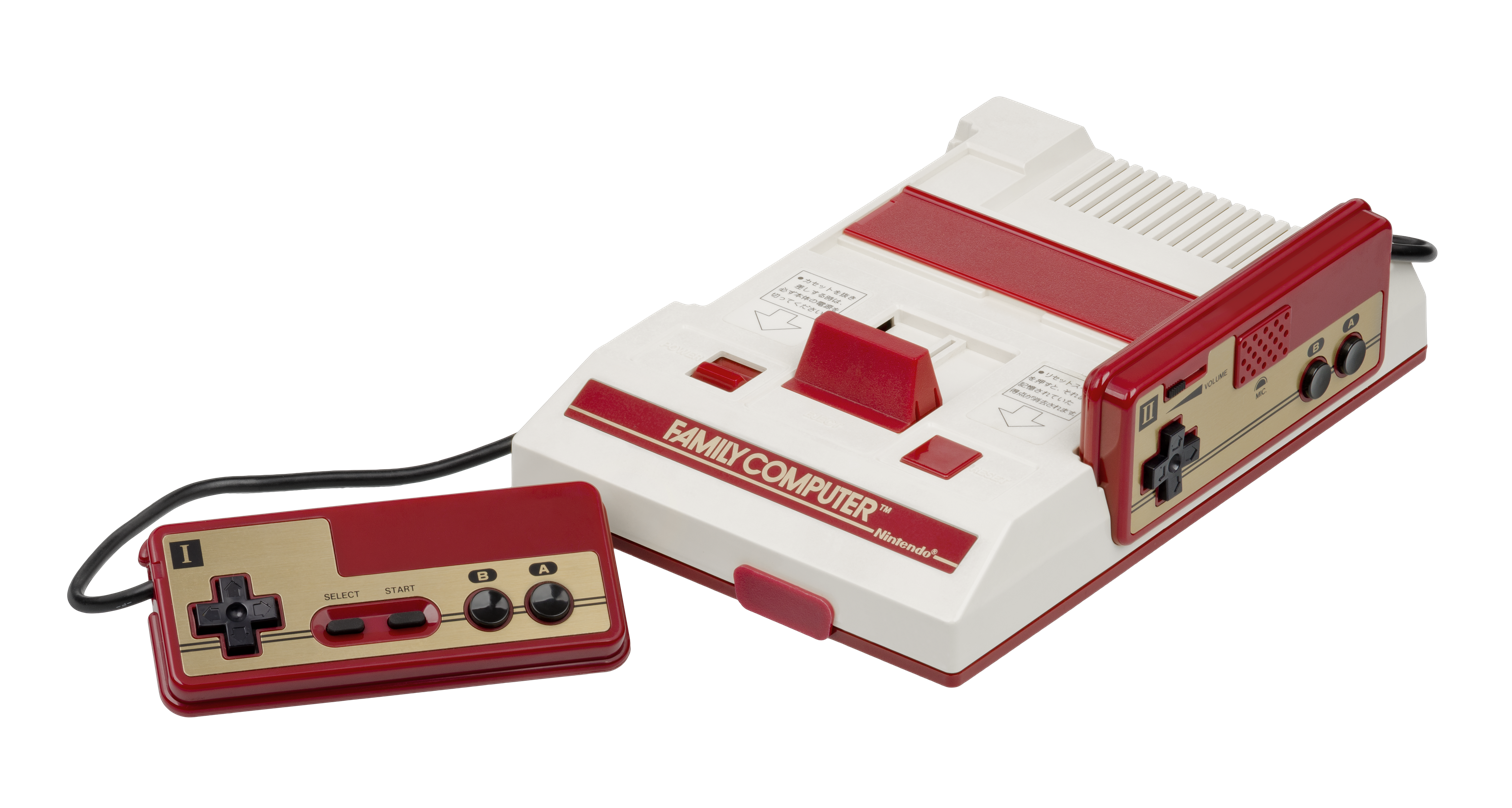
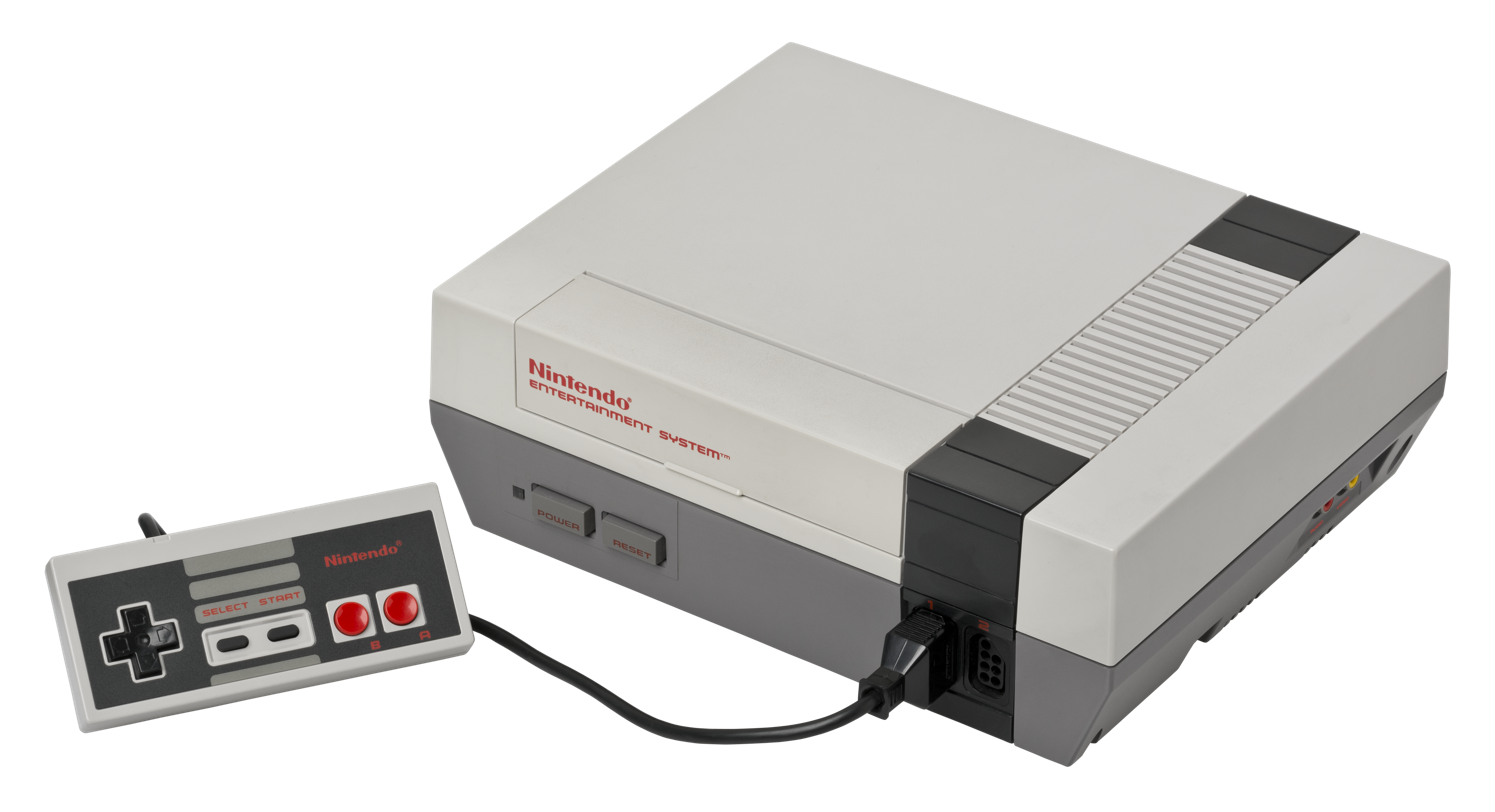
The success of the Color TV-Game series gave Nintendo faith in the console business, leading to the creation of the Family Computer and Nintendo Entertainment System.

The Color TV-Game series was very successful for Nintendo, and was a commercial hit. Nintendo sold one million units each of Color TV-Game 6 and Color TV-Game 15. One half million units each of Racing 112 and Block Kuzushi were sold. Their success prompted Nintendo to continue pursuing the video game console market, leading to the creation of the Family Computer and the Nintendo Entertainment System.

Erik Voskuil, writing for his blog Before Mario, believes that part of the reason for the success of the Color TV-Game series was its low price point, far below the competition. He wrote: "Almost thirty-five years and multiple generations of ever improving, multi-million selling Nintendo video game consoles on, we can reflect on this moment as the beginning of something very, very big." In his 2004 book Power-Up: How Japanese Video Games Gave the World an Extra Life, Chris Kohler claims that the colorful casing played a part in the systems performing well, saying they resembled toys more than video game consoles. Luke Plunkett of Kotaku acknowledged the consoles for their importance as Nintendo's first foray into the market, and for it being influential for its next system. Plunkett also said the series was successful for their low price, as it established Nintendo's "consoles must be sold at a profit" attitude that continued onward. PC Magazine's Benj Edwards noted that the Color TV-Game 6 and Color TV-Game 15 units in particular gave Nintendo faith in the market due to their commercial success. He noted that the Block Kuzushi marked the debut of Shigeru Miyamoto, an important figure within the company.

Nintendo has referenced the Color TV-Game systems and their built-in games in other franchises. Alleyway, a launch game for the Game Boy, is believed to be based on the Color TV-Game Block Kuzushi. Jeremy Parish said that Alleyway is a throwback to Block Kuzushi, due to it having been cemented in Nintendo's corporate roots. WarioWare, Inc.: Mega Microgames! and WarioWare Gold includes a microgame based on Racing 112, where the player has eight beats to dodge the moving cars. It is part of 9-Volt's stage, which comprises microgames featuring older Nintendo video games. A Color TV-Game 6 microgame appears in 9-Volt and 18-Volt's stage in WarioWare: Smooth Moves. An assist trophy based on the TV-Game 15 appears in Super Smash Bros. for Nintendo 3DS and Wii U and its follow-up Super Smash Bros. Ultimate. When summoned, it spawns a pair of paddles that launch a ball across the stage, which will inflict damage on fighters that touch it. In late 2020, a Nintendo 3DS game developed by Butterfly called The Queen TV-Game 2 was influenced by the console series name along with gameplay broadly based on Color TV-Game 6.
