= Radar Scope =

1980 video game

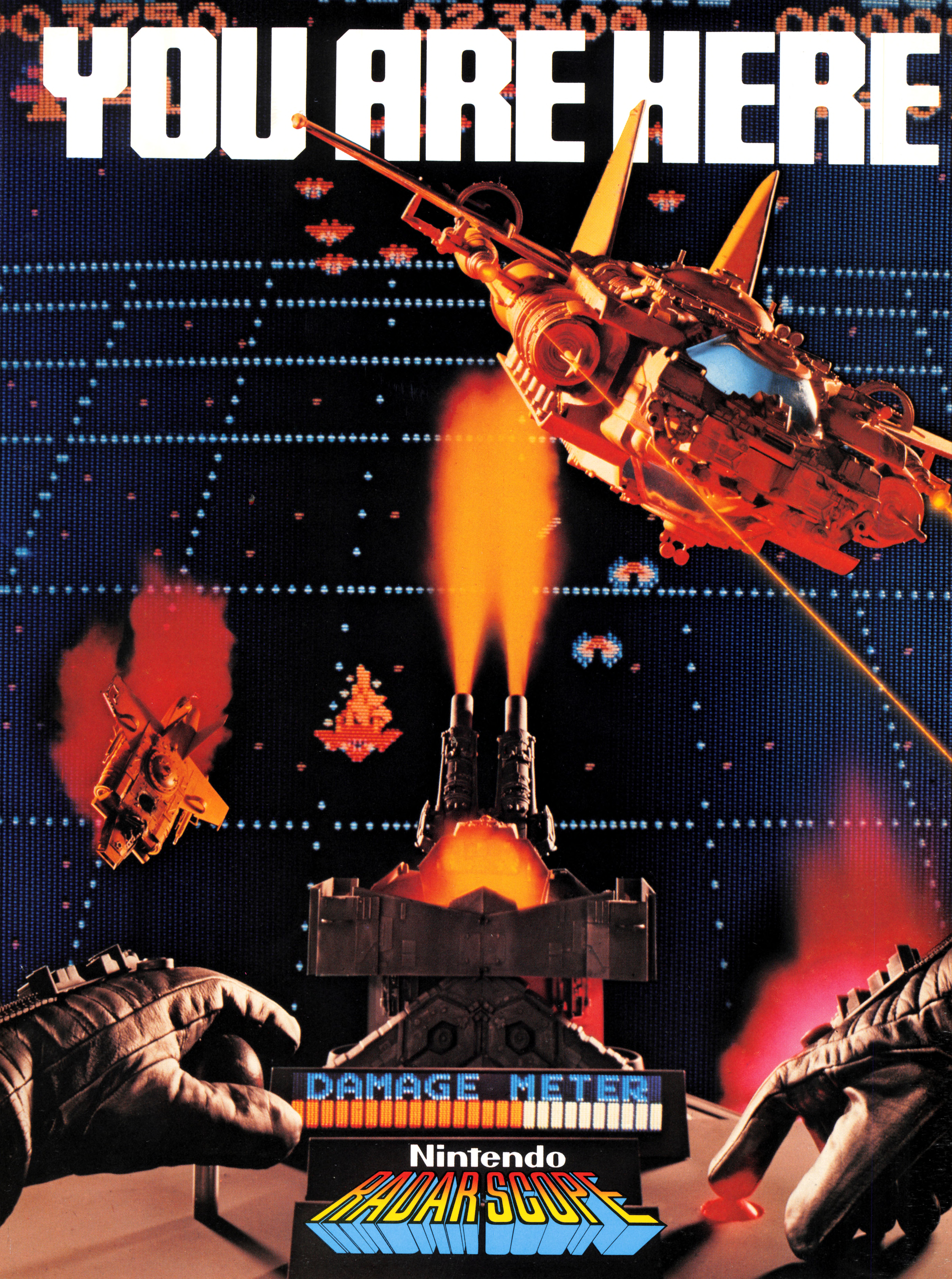
- North American arcade flyer
- Developers: Nintendo R&D2; Ikegami Tsushinki
- Publisher: Nintendo
- Composer: Hirokazu Tanaka
- Platform: Arcade
- Release: JP: October 8, 1980; NA: December 1980
- Genre: Shoot 'em up
- Modes: Single-player, multiplayer

Radar Scope (Note: Japanese: レーダースコープ, Hepburn: Rēdā Sukōpu) is a 1980 shoot 'em up video game developed and published by Nintendo for arcades. The player controls the Sonic Spaceport starship, which must wipe out formations of an enemy race known as the Gamma Raiders before they destroy the player's space station. The gameplay is similar to Space Invaders and Galaxian, albeit viewed from a three-dimensional perspective.

Radar Scope was a commercial failure, and created a financial crisis for the subsidiary Nintendo of America. Its president, Minoru Arakawa, pleaded for his father-in-law, Nintendo president Hiroshi Yamauchi, to send him a new game that could convert and salvage thousands of unsold Radar Scope machines, leading to the creation of Donkey Kong. Radar Scope is one of the first video game projects for artist Shigeru Miyamoto and composer Hirokazu Tanaka.

Retrospectively, critics have praised Radar Scope for its gameplay and design being a unique iteration upon the Space Invaders template. One critic labeled it one of Nintendo's most important games because its commercial failure inadvertently led to the creation of Nintendo's mascot character and helped pave the way for the company's entry into the console video game market.

== Gameplay ==
Game screenshot

Radar Scope is a shoot 'em up in a three-dimensional third-person perspective over a gradient-blue background, often described as a cross between Galaxian and Space Invaders. The player pilots the Sonic Spaceport starship and must defend the space station against enemies called the Gamma Raiders. Gameplay involves clearing each stage of the Gamma Raiders without colliding with them or their projectiles. Each stage sets 48 Gamma Raiders in a formation, who break away and swoop down toward the player. Some will simply swoop down and fire at the player, and others will try to ram into the space station. The Sonic Spaceport has a damage meter at the bottom of the screen, which depletes with enemy fire. The player can lose a life by either allowing this meter to deplete or by colliding with a Gamma Raider or their projectile. Three types of arcade cabinets were produced: a standard upright, a tabletop version, and a rare sit-down cabinet.

== Development and release ==
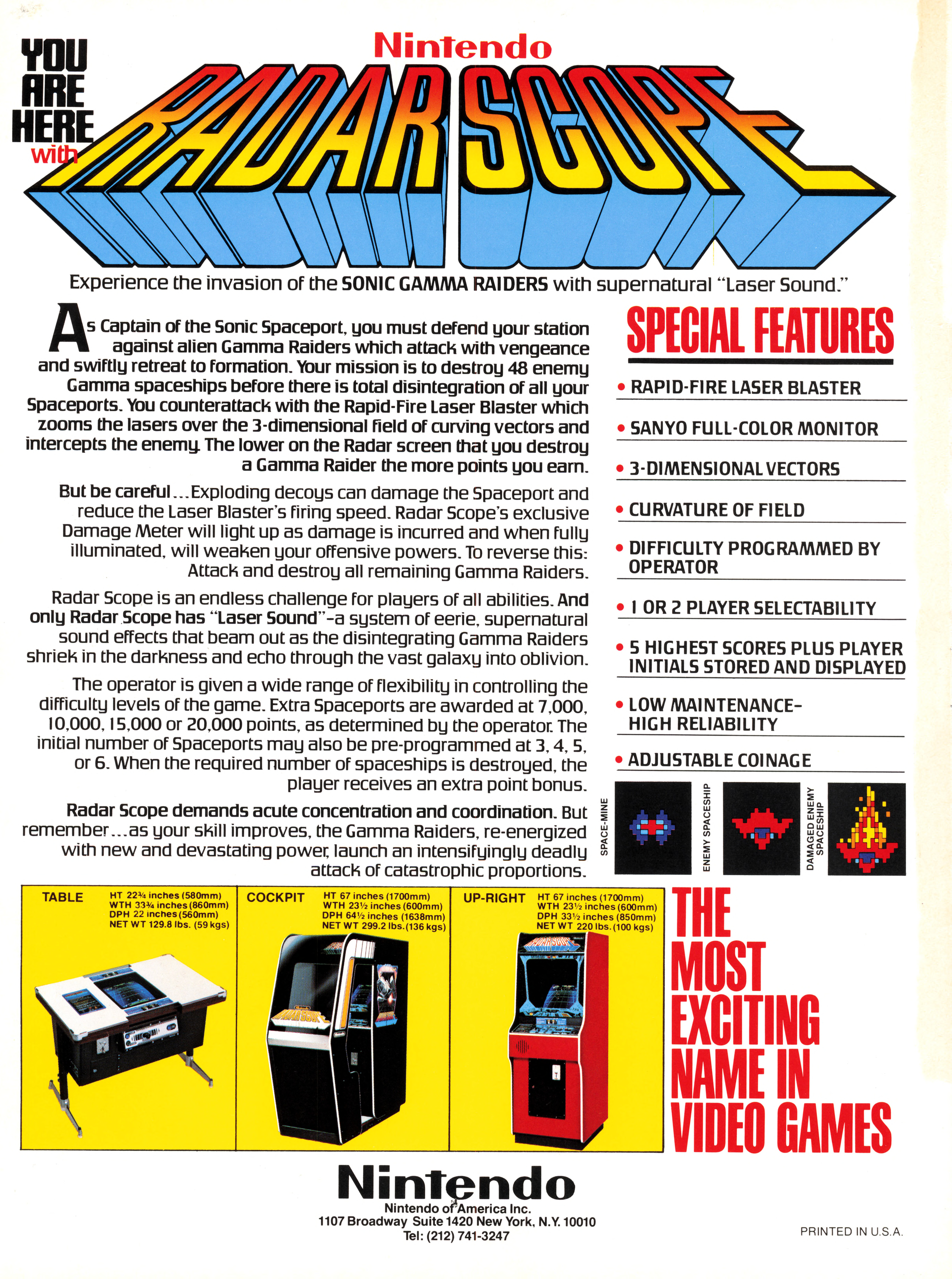
Print ad for Radar Scope from Play Meter's May 15, 1981 issue

In the late 1970s, Nintendo Co., Ltd. began shifting its focus away from toys and playing cards into the arcade market. This followed the 1973 oil crisis having increased the cost of manufacturing toys, and the widespread success of Taito's Space Invaders in 1978. Nintendo had briefly experimented with electro-mechanical arcade gun games such as Wild Gunman and the Laser Clay Shooting System, followed by arcade video games such as EVR-Race, Sheriff, Space Fever, and the Color TV-Game line of dedicated home consoles.

Radar Scope was created by Nintendo Research & Development 2 (R&D2). Masayuki Uemura led the development of the game, while Hirokazu Tanaka programmed the audio and composed the music. Shigeru Miyamoto assisted in the game's art production as one of his first video game projects; however, his role in development is often debated, with some claiming he designed the onscreen graphics, and others saying he simply created the arcade cabinet artwork. David Scheff's book Game Over claims that Miyamoto found the game "simplistic and banal" after it was completed.

The arcade hardware for Radar Scope was co-developed with Ikegami Tsushinki. It is based on Namco's Galaxian (1979), with technology such as high-speed emitter-coupled logic (ECL) integrated circuit (IC) chips and memory on a 50 MHz printed circuit board. Galaxian, in turn, was based on Space Invaders hardware, replacing the more intensive bitmap rendering system with a hardware sprite rendering system that animates sprites over a scrolling background, allowing more detailed graphics, faster gameplay, and a scrolling animated starfield background. The Radar Scope arcade cabinet had an expensive price of ¥1 million or $10,000 (equivalent to $39,000 in 2025).

Radar Scope was released in Japan on October 8, 1980. That year, Minoru Arakawa established the subsidiary Nintendo of America in New York City. Based on favorable tests at arcades in Seattle, he wagered most of the company's modest corporate budget on ordering 3,000 Radar Scope units from Nintendo Co., Ltd. Shipping the units into New York by boat took four months, by which time the market lost interest. A total of 1,000 Radar Scope units were sold to an underwhelming reception, and the remaining 2,000 sat in Nintendo's warehouse. This expensive failure put Nintendo of America into a financial crisis.

Arakawa moved the distressed startup to the Seattle area to cut shipping time. He asked his father in-law and Nintendo CEO Hiroshi Yamauchi to develop a new game that could be retrofitted into the unsold Radar Scope cabinets. Yamauchi polled the company's entire talent pool for fresh game design concepts that could satisfy Nintendo of America's needs. The result was Shigeru Miyamoto's debut as lead game designer with Donkey Kong, starring Mario and released in 1981. The Donkey Kong conversion kits consisting of ROM chips and cabinet marquee graphics were shipped to Nintendo of America and installed on more than 2,000 Radar Scope machines by a small team including Arakawa and his wife.

== Reception and legacy ==
Reception

Review score
Publication	Score
AllGame	2.5/5

Radar Scope was a commercial failure for Nintendo upon release. In Japan, it ranked among the top 20 highest-earning arcade video games of 1980, but failed to turn a profit due to the expensive price leaving many machines unsold. Overseas, an estimated 3,000 arcade cabinets were shipped to the United States, with 1,000 sold to an underwhelming reception and the remaining 2,000 sat unsold in Nintendo's warehouse. The salvage of unsold Radar Scope hardware—by creating Donkey Kong and Mario—provided the company with its first international smash hit and a resulting windfall of $280 million. This rescued Nintendo of America from financial crisis, established Nintendo as a prominent brand in the United States, and helped fund its launch of the Nintendo Entertainment System.

In a 1998 retrospective review, Earl Green of Allgame said the 3D perspective is a unique idea for the time, and that Radar Scope improved the trend of countless games styled after the archetypal Space Invaders. Shack News writer Greg Burke liked the game's colorful visuals and interesting gameplay which differentiate it from games like Galaxian and Space Invaders. 1UP.com criticized the lack of "tight design" as found in Galaxian, and for its blaring and annoying sound effects. They said the third-person perspective is a unique innovation, imitated years later by games such as Konami's Juno First and Activision's Beamrider.

In 2014, Jeremy Parish of USGamer said that Radar Scope "belonged to the better class of [Space Invaders] rip-offs". He greatly applauded the 3D perspective for providing a unique sense of progression and depth. He was disappointed that the game is poorly recognized over the decades due to its rough history and scarcity, writing: "Sadly, Radar Scope tends to be brushed under the rug as a matter of no real significance: A failed game whose only positive contribution to gaming history was providing an opportunity for something better to come along. In truth, though, Radar Scope wasn't a poor game by any measure; its crimes were instead a simple matter of timing, and of being the focus of Nintendo's ill-conceived ambitions." He said that Radar Scope created a "lever" that allowed Nintendo to successfully propel themselves into the console market.
