= CamCutter =

Technology for recording broadcast quality video to hard disk

CamCutter is a digital video camera technology developed by Ikegami and Avid Technology for recording broadcast quality video to hard disk, dubbed a Digital Disk Recorder. First revealed in 1995 at the National Association of Broadcasters convention in Las Vegas, it used a camera mechanism by Ikegami and a special FieldPack unit instead of a tape transport unit. The CamCutter outpaced subsequent tapeless camcorders introduced by Sony and Panasonic by years. In October 2010, the National Academy of Television Arts & Sciences (NATAS) announced the recipients of the 62nd Annual Technology & Engineering Emmy® Awards. Ikegami and Avid Technology were announced as a winner for the Development and Production of Portable Tapeless Acquisition. Today's CamCutter technology can be found in Ikegami's Editcam products.

== Features ==
Some of the features of being hard disk based was in-camera editing, faster than real time transfer of footage and the RetroLoop, which used a circular buffer to constantly record footage, and allowed saving a "take" after the action happened. This camera technology provides time lapse capture and animation modes (1 frame per trigger).

== Cost ==
The price of the initial unit was between US$40,000 to $60,000. Ikegami and Avid developed a follow on tapeless acquisition camera, the DNS201 which shipped in the late 1990s. This unit sold for below US$30,000. In 2000, NL Technology spun out of Avid and continued developing two more generations of this technology. The DNS33 priced below US$30,000 and the hi definition Avid DNxHD camera, the HDN-X10, priced in between US$30,000 and $40,000.

== Disadvantages ==
Due to its huge cost and prototype look and feel, many photographers did not use the initial hardware. Ikegami and NL Technology developed lower cost and more ergonomic versions that sold much better in the late 1990s and through 2010.
