= Popeye no Eigo Asobi =

1983 video game

- Japanese Famicom box art.
- Developer(s): Nintendo
- Publisher(s): Nintendo
- Producer(s): Shigeru Miyamoto
- Platform(s): Family Computer
- Release: JP: November 22, 1983
- Genre(s): Educational, platform
- Mode(s): Single-player, multiplayer

Popeye no Eigo Asobi (Note: Japanese: ポパイの英語遊び, Hepburn: Popai no Eigo Asobi; lit. Popeye's English Fun) (English: Popeye's English Fun) is a 1983 edutainment platform video game developed and published by Nintendo for the Family Computer. The game was based on the comic strip of same name created by E. C. Segar and licensed from King Features Entertainment. It is a spin-off of the Popeye arcade game made by Nintendo. It was released exclusively in Japan. It was followed by the similar Donkey Kong Jr. Math, which was released about one month later. This game was never released in North America because of the majority of English speakers in the United States and Canada and a corresponding version that would teach players Japanese was not created due to the technical limitations of the Nintendo Entertainment System along with the lack of popularity in the West to learn Japanese aside from cultural or business purposes in the 1980s.

== Gameplay ==
In the game, Popeye teaches players how to spell English words. The layout is similar to the Popeye arcade game, except that players cannot "die", they can only get incorrect answers. The game includes three modes: Word Puzzle A, Word Puzzle B, and Word Catcher. In Word Puzzle A (based on the first level of the original game), the player is given the Japanese term for a word in one of six categories: Animal, Country, Food, Sports, Science, and Others (due to technical limitations, these terms are displayed entirely as katakana, regardless of their origin). Blank squares for the English word are given, and the player must maneuver Popeye around to point to letters of the alphabet in order to fill in the blanks. Each wrong letter entry prompts Brutus/Bluto to punch a basket carrying Swee'Pea; the player must solve the puzzle before Swee'Pea's basket is knocked off the platform it is attached to.

The player may also forfeit the puzzle by punching the "?" icon. If the puzzle is lost or forfeited, the correct English word will be displayed. Word Puzzle B is identical to the "A" mode; however, the player is not given the Japanese term beforehand. In the two-player Word Catcher mode (based on the third level of the original game), the first player controls Popeye and the second controls Bluto. Three Japanese words are displayed on the screen's left side, and both players compete to collect letters thrown by Olive Oyl to spell out their English equivalents. A player wins when he or she has correctly spelled five words.

== See also ==
- List of Famicom games
