= Wrecking Crew (video game) =

1985 video game

- North American box art
- Developer: Nintendo R&D1
- Publisher: Nintendo
- Director: Satoru Okada
- Producer: Gunpei Yokoi
- Designers: Yoshio Sakamoto; Makoto Kanoh
- Programmers: Toshiyuki Nakamura; Yase Sobajima; Kenji Imai
- Artists: Yoshio Sakamoto; Hiroji Kiyotake
- Composer: Hirokazu Tanaka
- Series: Mario
- Platforms: Arcade, Nintendo Entertainment System, Famicom Disk System, Game Boy Advance
- Release: July 26, 1984: Arcade (VS. Wrecking Crew); JP: July 26, 1984; NA: September 1984; WW: 1985; NES; JP: June 18, 1985; NA: October 18, 1985; EU: October 15, 1987; Famicom Disk System; JP: February 3, 1989; Game Boy Advance; JP: May 21, 2004
- Genres: Action, puzzle
- Modes: Single-player, multiplayer
- Arcade system: Nintendo VS. System

Wrecking Crew (Note: Japanese: レッキングクルー, Hepburn: Rekkingu Kurū) is an action game developed and published by Nintendo. It was first released for arcades for the Nintendo VS. System in 1984, titled VS. Wrecking Crew with a simultaneous two-player mode. It was released as a single-player game for the Family Computer (Famicom) console in 1985, and as a launch game for the Nintendo Entertainment System (NES) later that year.

It was designed by Yoshio Sakamoto and Makoto Kanoh. It is a spin-off of Nintendo's Mario franchise, featuring Mario (and, in two-player mode, Luigi) going through levels attempting to destroy certain objects. A sequel, Wrecking Crew '98, was released only in Japan in 1998 for the Super Famicom, and the game's legacy would continue beyond with appearances from its antagonist Spike in the Mario spin-off Mobile Golf (2001), the films The Super Mario Bros. Movie (2023) and The Super Mario Galaxy Movie (2026), and its Golden Hammer appearing as an item in the Super Smash Bros. series.

== Gameplay ==
Screenshot

The player controls Mario (or Luigi in two-player mode) and attempts to destroy all of a certain set of objects with a large hammer on each of 100 levels. Mario cannot jump because of the hammer's weight. The player can select any level to start on from the title screen. Each level's playfield is divided into an invisible grid, each space of which can contain one object. Objects include these: destructible walls, pillars, and ladders; indestructible barrels and ladders; bombs that destroy all connected destructible objects; and various enemies that Mario must avoid. Doors may be opened to cause enemies to move harmlessly into the background. The game introduced a new character, a construction foreman named Spike (known as Blackie in the Japanese version), who chases Mario and attempts to disrupt him by knocking down objects and causing him to fall to the bottom of the playfield. The player starts the game with five lives and loses a life whenever Mario comes in contact with an enemy or fireball. The game is over when all lives are lost. The game can also be aborted at any time, and must be aborted if Mario becomes trapped in a barrel.

Because Mario lacks the ability to jump, the player must figure out the optimal order in which to destroy objects—for example, if a player destroys a ladder too soon, a wall may become unreachable and thus the player cannot finish the level. Destroying multiple objects in a row (usually with a chain of bombs) scores extra bonus points, and occasionally bonus items may appear that Mario can collect.

Wrecking Crew features a level editor, which allows the player to design up to four custom levels. They can be saved and loaded using the Famicom Data Recorder, a cassette tape drive. Because this peripheral was only released for Famicom in Japan, other localizations cannot save or load the custom levels. The U.S. manual includes a note stating that the load and save functions "have been programmed in for potential product developments". The feature was reenabled for the Wii Virtual Console release using Wii system storage.

== Reception ==
In Japan, Game Machine listed Vs. Wrecking Crew in its October 1, 1984, issue as the thirteenth most-successful table arcade unit of the month.

Reviewing the Wii U re-release, Stephen Kelly of Nintendo Life gave the game a 6/10 score, praising its robust game design and level editor while criticizing its lack of variety and monotonous graphics.

== Re-releases ==
Wrecking Crew was re-released in 1989 on the Family Computer Disk System, and in 2004 as the 14th game of the Famicom Mini series for the Game Boy Advance. It was also included as a playable bonus game in its sequel, Wrecking Crew '98.

The game was re-released on the Wii's Virtual Console in 2007. It was briefly distributed to Nintendo 3DS owners in September 2011 as part of the "Ambassador Program", before being made available for general sale on the Nintendo 3DS' Virtual Console in Japan in September 2012, with a release in other territories following in 2013. Wrecking Crew was also released on the Wii U's Virtual Console in June 2013. All Virtual Console releases, excluding the 3DS version, support saving custom level designs, which is not possible in the original NES version of the game.

In July 2019, Wrecking Crew was added to the Nintendo Classics service for the Nintendo Switch. In April 2020, Hamster Corporation re-released VS. Wrecking Crew as part of their Arcade Archives series for the Nintendo Switch.

== Sequel ==
Wrecking Crew '98
- Developers: Nintendo R&D1; Pax Softnica
- Publisher: Nintendo
- Director: Eiko Takahashi
- Producer: Tatsuya Hishida
- Designers: Eiko Takahashi; Noriyuki Enoki; Naoki Watanabe; Takashi Kouyama; Reiko Kajigaya
- Programmers: Narumi Nakashima; Taisuke Araki; Hirotaka Katoh
- Composers: Hirokazu Tanaka; Takane Ōkubo
- Series: Mario
- Platform: Super Famicom
- Release: Nintendo Power (SFC): JP: January 1, 1998; Super Famicom: JP: May 23, 1998
- Genres: Action, puzzle
- Modes: Single-player, multiplayer

Wrecking Crew '98 (Note: Japanese: レッキングクルー'98, Hepburn: Rekkingu Kurū Nainti Eito) is an action puzzle game released exclusively in Japan in 1998 for the Super Famicom's Nintendo Power download service, and later on cartridge. Unlike the original, in which the player's objective is to find ways to clear each level of all panels, Wrecking Crew '98 takes a more competitive approach: various blocks and colored panels appear on each player's side of the screen, and the player must attempt to line up three or more panels of the same color to remove them. When a set of panels disappears, all blocks and panels above it will drop, potentially allowing the player to create chain combos. Clearing four or more panels of the same color will trigger an attack that hinders the opponent; each panel color will produce a different type of attack. The match ends when one player's screen becomes filled with panels, causing them to lose.

The game's story features Mario, who returns to the Mushroom Kingdom after a trip, only to discover that Bowser has started constructing multiple new high-rise bases, depriving the surrounding flora of sunlight. To stop Bowser, Mario retrieves his magic hammer from his time on the Wrecking Crew and begins demolishing Bowser's bases. At each location, he encounters a member of Bowser's construction crew whom he must defeat to destroy the base, including his former rival Foreman Spike.

The main single player mode is Story mode, in which the player controls Mario who travels through an overworld, in an attempt to enter each of Bowser's construction sites and defeat a rival opponent. Completing each stage within a time limit will unlock several secret stages and an alternate ending. Clearing stages in Story mode will unlock up to 12 total playable characters for use in Versus mode, a competitive mode for one to two players. Clearing the Story also unlocks Tournament mode, in which eight characters must compete in a single-elimination tournament until only one remains and is declared the champion. A playable port of the original Wrecking Crew is also accessible from the main menu.

The game was re-released on the Wii U's Virtual Console in Japan on September 28, 2016, and on the Nintendo Classics service on April 12, 2024, for the first time in the West. A fanmade English translation patch for the game was released in October 2017.

== Legacy ==
Foreman Spike appears as a playable character in Mobile Golf (2001). The Bonus Stage theme from Wrecking Crew was remixed for Dance Dance Revolution: Mario Mix (2005). The Golden Hammer appears as a usable item in the Super Smash Bros. series, beginning with Super Smash Bros. Brawl (2008). A "Wrecking Crew" stage also appears in Super Smash Bros. for Wii U (2014) and Super Smash Bros. Ultimate (2018).

Spike appears in The Super Mario Bros. Movie (2023), voiced by Sebastian Maniscalco. This version is the former boss of Mario and Luigi before they started their plumbing business. After nearly 40 years, the name was standardized for future appearances as Spike also in Japan, where he was previously known as Blackie or Blacky due to his classically black beard and sunglasses, as it already was known in all regions before the release of the film.

== See also ==
- List of Nintendo Entertainment System games
