= Editcam =

Camera system that recorded directly to hard disks

Editcam is a professional digital camera system manufactured by Ikegami and first introduced in 1995, available both as professional camcorders and modular dock recorders. It is the first ever tapeless field acquisition device and has evolved into a range of SD and HD cameras. As a portable camera system, it can record digital video data direct to a hard disk drive.

The Editcam's most distinguishing feature is the recording medium: the FieldPak, which is a cartridge that contains an IDE hard disk with up to 120 GB of storage, or its compatible companion, the RAMPak, a flash memory module with up to 16 GB. A 120 GB capacity FieldPak translates to some 9 hours of DV25 video. Both, unlike tape-based formats, allow random access to the video data, and both standalone videocassette recorder (VCR) replacement players and computer adaptor racks are available for the Paks. This made the Editcam a pioneer in the field of non-linear acquisition, but the earliest incarnations of the Editcam were plagued with high power consumption and weight and sold only about 50 units. These problems were addressed with the Editcam II in 1999.

The latest generation of the Editcam system, Editcam3, can record in the formats Avid JFIF, DV and optionally MPEG IMX and DVCPRO50. HDTV variants are now also available, which record in the Avid DNxHD format. Introduced at NAB 2005, the Editcam HD allows for video capture at 145 Mbit/s. Employing CMOS sensors, the camera record files natively in 1080i or 720P and at several bitrates. One of its most notable products is the HDN-X10 Editcam HD camera, which was adopted by the American Idol production company in its bid to save drive space. It is capable of storing images in full resolution on the FieldPak2 removable media using the Avid DNxHD codec in MXF file format.

The Editcam product family is a result of the development of CamCutter technology developed jointly by Ikegami and Avid Technology.
