= Hirokazu Tanaka =

Japanese video game composer

- 田中 宏和
- Born: December 13, 1957 (age 68); Kyoto, Japan
- Other names: Hip Tanaka; Chip Tanaka
- Occupations: Composer; sound designer; producer; executive
- Years active: 1980–present
- Employers: Nintendo (1980–1999); Creatures Inc. (1999–present)
- Musical career
- Genres: Chiptune; dub; reggae; anison
- Instrument: Keyboards
- Website: hirokazutanaka.com

Hirokazu "Hip" Tanaka (田中 宏和, Tanaka Hirokazu; born December 13, 1957), also known as Chip Tanaka, is a Japanese musician, composer, sound designer, and executive who pioneered chiptune music. He is best known as one of Nintendo's in-house composers during the 8- and 16-bit era of video games. Tanaka also had a role in designing and programming the Famicom and Game Boy audio hardware, along with the NES Zapper, Game Boy Camera, and Game Boy Printer.

Tanaka's soundtrack credits include Metroid (1986), Kid Icarus (1986), Super Mario Land (1989), Tetris (1989), Mother (1989), Dr. Mario (1990), and EarthBound (1994). He was the president and executive director of Creatures Inc. from 2001 to 2023, before resigning and taking on the role of Creative Fellow in the company.

== Biography ==
=== Early life ===
Born to a schoolteacher mother who had Tanaka undergo piano lessons, Tanaka recounted that he first began paying serious attention to music while in elementary school, and attempted to form a band during that time. His first band was formed when he was in middle school, a Beatles and Elton John cover group, which sometimes performed concerts at his school. He has held a longstanding obsession with reggae music. In his teens, he was also in a reggae band, which was known variously by the names the Shampoos or Roots Rockers. For the music event "Reggae Sunsplash" held in Osaka, the Shampoos were an opening act for Sly and Robbie on more than one occasion. Tanaka did meet the duo during those times. On The Shampoos, Tanaka described it as an obscure local band which did gigs in Tokyo about once or twice a year, and that it was "never a formal thing".

=== Employment at Nintendo ===
In 1980, after graduating from university with a degree in electronics engineering, Tanaka successfully applied for a job at Nintendo as a sound designer. He did not initially want to be an engineer, but Nintendo were accordingly scouting for "different sounds or toys or something at the time. I thought toys would be relatively stress-free, so I applied." The first game Tanaka worked on was Space Firebird (1980), where Tanaka was composer and constructed a new sound chip for particular sound effects. Following this, Tanaka worked on Donkey Kong (1981), providing the sound effects for Mario's footsteps and jumps. Usually, the same sound effect was repeated across many different actions, but Tanaka's approach differed where he invented subtle variations. He attempted to insert voice synthesis for the game's damsel-in-distress, but the idea was vetoed by then-Nintendo president Hiroshi Yamauchi's daughter, who did not feel that the sample sounded like the exclamation "help me!". Tanaka noted that he learned "a lot" from series creator Shigeru Miyamoto due to his perfectionism and "level of commitment".

Donkey Kong 3 (1983) was the first game where Tanaka acted both as composer and sound effects designer. His approach to game composition carried on from his dub obsession: "For instance, if you listen to the music in Wrecking Crew (1985), you could recognize that some parts are drum and bass only. So that turned out to be an idea for working around the limitations of the game software. I figured that, to get the most out of the game music, a dub-based structure would be a really great solution. I'd play the melody in some parts, then cut it off and insert a part with just drums and bass, and vice versa. No one else was doing it, but it was what I wanted to do." Tanaka described what he remembered as a "typical day" at Nintendo in the brief period following the release of the Famicom home game console:

Everything just stayed the same. From morning to night, we made new circuits and developed software. We had computers for work but they were TTY devices; they had no monitors. Back and forth, morning to night. Sometimes designing hardware, and sometimes creating software. Back and forth, for me at least. ... I'd work from 9AM to as late as 2 or 3 in the morning. They didn't make us do it. It was just fun. We talk about the history of games, but for me, the history of games and computers overlap. If anything, I think it was more of the history of the evolution of computers ... I studied all about computers after I joined Nintendo. I think our generation of Nintendo employees were all the same. We learned as we went, built our own systems, and built them again. For instance, we made our own development tools. So everything was handmade. It was really fun. ... There was a continuous stream of new jobs and you'd go from one to the next.

While working full-time at Nintendo on two or three games a year, and sometimes two simultaneously, Tanaka continued playing gigs in Osaka and Tokyo with the Shampoos. Sometime in the late 1980s, they recorded the 45 rpm "Thunder Dub" which prominently sampled the opening drumbeat from the Beatles' "Sgt. Pepper's Lonely Hearts Club Band (Reprise)" (1967). Tanaka did not personally see a difference between the music he composed for video games and the music he composed in his off time. For Metroid (1986), Tanaka acknowledged that games were becoming more complex, and his scores were becoming more like a film's, desiring in Metroid not to "repeat the same game-melody cliches," although he recalls that the game's soundtrack was not well-received within Nintendo because of its dark atmosphere. He was inspired by the film Birdy (1984) to create a game score that was dark until the very end, where the player would finally receive music with a strong melody. Despite disapproval from his Nintendo colleagues, Tanaka was allowed full creative freedom on projects, and even had a fluctuating role in influencing some games' content and play style. He remembers Nintendo's strict, repeated criticisms over the amount of "fun" a game would have, but that there was no financial pressure in creating games, nor were there sales quotas to meet. At the time of Dr. Mario (1990), Tanaka began observing an increasing number of "serious" game composers who had graduated from music schools. Dr. Mario was thus the first time Tanaka had asserted his musical personality in a game.

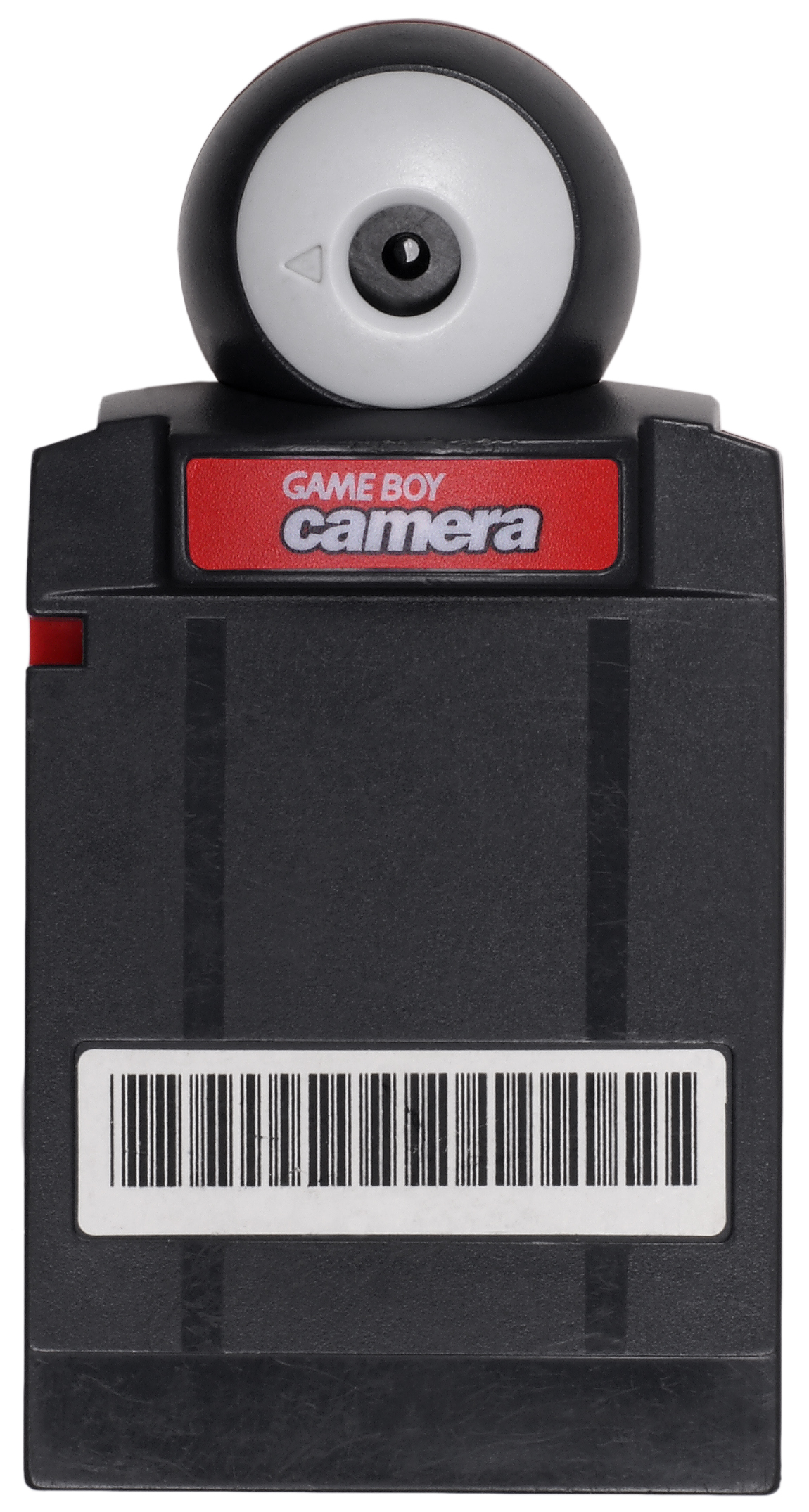
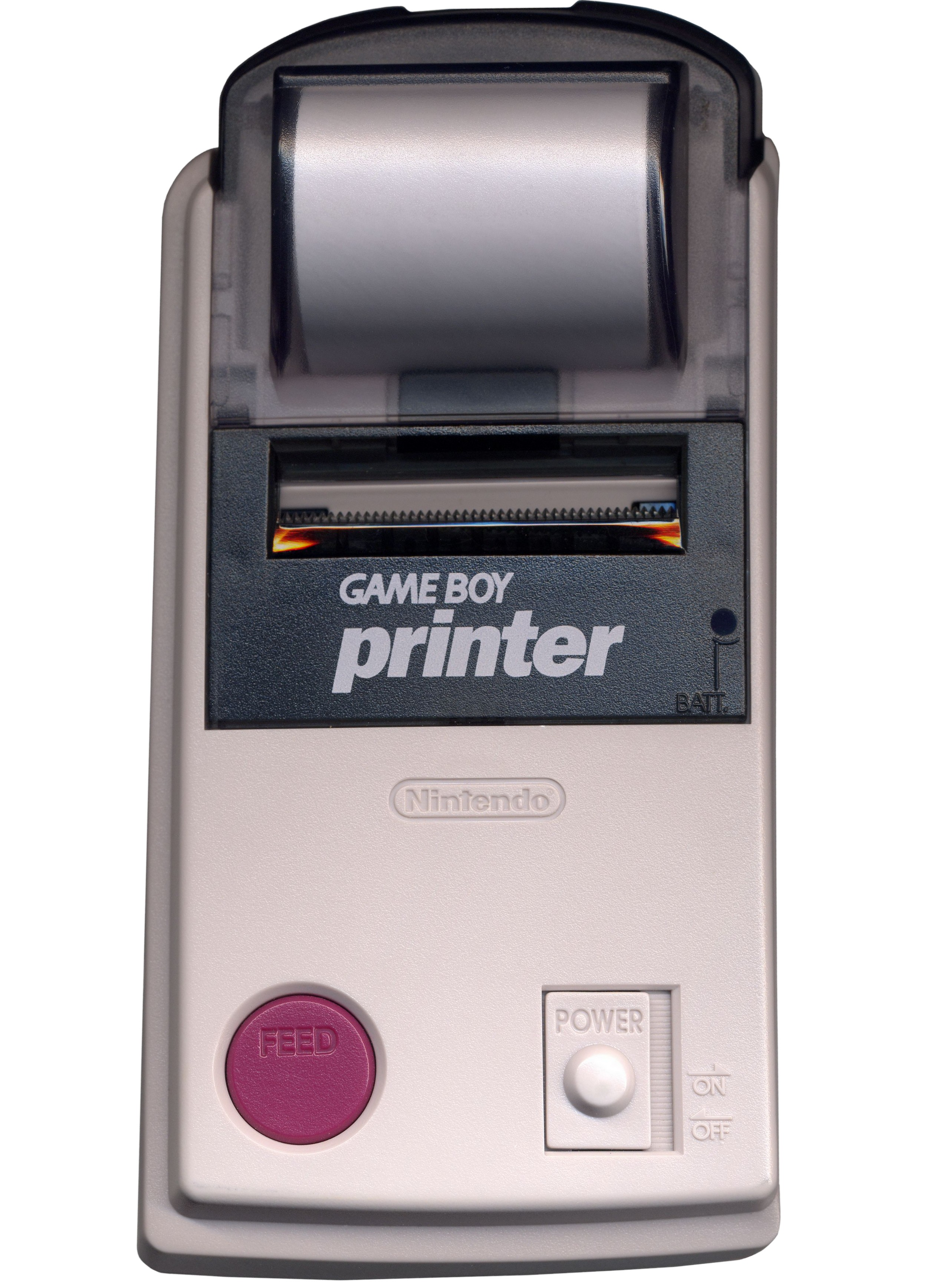
The Game Boy Camera and Game Boy Printer were both co-designed by Tanaka.

Tanaka was one of "about five or six" Nintendo-based developers who designed the Game Boy, researching and creating its audio hardware. He was inspired to develop the Game Boy Camera from a product called ViewCam that was popular at the time — Tanaka also ran experiments on the possibility of watching television via the Game Boy.

=== Creatures Inc. ===
At the advice of EarthBound (1994) co-worker Tsunekazu Ishihara, Tanaka would join Creatures Inc. as a guest composer, where he would end up composing dozens of songs for the first Japanese Pokémon anime and various Pokémon promotional releases. Despite the fact that his themes were not used in the West, they inspired best-selling singles and albums in Japan due to their popularity there. Tanaka was eventually forbidden by Nintendo to continue to write more songs for the anime due to their policy of not allowing employees to work for other companies, so he resigned at Nintendo and joined Creatures full-time in 1999.

Tanaka succeeded Ishihara to become the president of Creatures in 2001, while Ishihara continued as CEO. Starting in the late 2000s, Tanaka began to perform at Japanese dance clubs under the name "Chip Tanaka". The moniker was suggested by a foreign acquaintance, as Tanaka thought "Hip Tanaka" was too attached to his time at Nintendo.

After the death of Satoru Iwata in 2015, Tanaka wrote a tribute track titled "Dedicated to Satoru Iwata". In April 2023, Tanaka announced he was stepping down as president and executive director of Creatures, but would remain as a Creative Fellow.

== Influences ==
Tanaka has said that his tastes in his youth were typical of the time, listening to artists such as the Beatles and the Carpenters. His first exposure to dub music was through the 1978 album Negrea Love Dub by Linval Thompson while eating pasta at a restaurant with live music in Kyoto. It was the record's use of exaggerated tape delay which astounded Tanaka, who stopped eating every time he heard it occur: "I thought 'Is this music sick?' But the more I listened to it, that groove with the bass line and the mixer... I think the mixer takes full control of it, directly and instinctively. When I felt it, I thought 'This is amazing.' I was totally hooked." Tanaka explained his fascination with reggae music and his application for it in his game scores: "It wasn't proactive on my part. I was a music lover that happened to be working at Nintendo. ... The reason I like reggae, especially dub, is because there actually is vocal and guitar on it, let's say, but in the essence, it's strictly driven by drums and bass. That's what I love about it the most. ... I think I like how there's this raw aspect to it. The gritty, raw quality of the sound, let's say. That really caught my ears. And that deep bass sound, the "buuu..." That was something I never heard before in rock music. It drove me like no other genre in music."

Among specific musical influences, Tanaka has cited Brian Wilson, Randy Newman, Stackridge, Yabby U, the Flying Lizards, Prince, Lalo Rodriguez, My Bloody Valentine, Frank Zappa, Keiichi Suzuki, Hal Willner's various artists compilations, Sly Dunbar, Jah Wobble, and the Slits. The "hip" in "Hip Tanaka" came from hip hop, with his favorite artist of the genre being A Tribe Called Quest.

== Works ==
Video games
Year	Title	Notes
1980	Space Firebird	Sound effects
1980	Radar Scope	Sound effects
1980	Heli Fire	Sound effects
1981	Donkey Kong	Sound effects
1982	Mickey & Donald	Programmer
1982	Donkey Kong II	Programmer
1983	Donkey Kong 3	Sound effects
1983	Mario Bros.	Sound effects
1983	Pinball	Programmer
1983	Mario's Cement Factory	Programmer
1983	Donkey Kong Jr.	Programmer
1983	Snoopy	Programmer
1983	Popeye	Programmer
1983	Mario's Bombs Away	Programmer
1984	Spitball Sparky	Programmer
1984	Wild Gunman	Music, sound effects
1984	Duck Hunt	Music, sound effects
1984	Hogan's Alley	Music, sound effects
1984	Urban Champion	Music, sound effects
1985	Balloon Fight	Music, sound effects
1985	Wrecking Crew	Music, sound effects
1985	Stack-Up	Music, sound effects
1985	Gyromite	Music, sound effects
1986	Gumshoe	Music, sound effects
1986	Metroid	Music, sound effects
1986	Kid Icarus	Music, sound effects
1987	Ginga no Sannin	Music supervisor
1988	Famicom Wars	Music with Kenji Yamamoto
1989	Super Mario Land	Music, sound effects
1989	Yakuman	Music, sound effects
1989	Tetris	Music, sound effects
1989	Mother	Music with Keiichi Suzuki
1989	Golf	Sound effects
1990	Knight Move	Music, sound effects
1990	Dr. Mario	Music, sound effects
1990	Balloon Kid	Music, sound effects
1992	Hello Kitty World	Music, sound effects
1992	Fire Emblem Gaiden	Supervisor
1992	Mario Paint	Music with Ryoji Yoshitomi and Kazumi Totaka
1992	X	Sound effects
1994	EarthBound	Music with Keiichi Suzuki, Hiroshi Kanazu, and Toshiyuki Ueno
1995	Snoopy Concert	Music with Minako Hamano
1997	Game & Watch Gallery	Advisor
1998	Game Boy Camera	Director, graphic designer, music
1998	Wrecking Crew '98	Sound director
2001	Chee-Chai Alien	Director, game designer, music
2001	Machop at Work	Director
2001	Kingler's Day	Director
2003	Pokémon Channel	Supervisor
2008	Super Smash Bros. Brawl	Music arrangements (Note: "Donkey Kong" and "Squeak Squad Theme")
2009	PokéPark Wii: Pikachu's Adventure	Producer
2011	Pokédex 3D	Producer
2011	PokéPark 2: Wonders Beyond	Producer
2012	Pokémon Dream Radar	Producer
2012	Pokédex 3D Pro	Producer
2014	Super Smash Bros. for Nintendo 3DS and Wii U	Music arrangements (Note: "Chill ver. 2 (Dr. Mario)", "Balloon Trip", and "Pac-Man Club Mix")
2014	Pokémon Art Academy	Pokémon Trading Card Development
2016	Detective Pikachu	Producer
2018	Super Smash Bros. Ultimate	Music arrangements (Note: "Sand Ocean" and "Seaskape")
2025	Street Fighter 6	"Glorious Match"

Anime
Year	Title	Notes
1997–2002	Pokémon	Japanese opening and ending themes
2002–2006	Pokémon: Advanced Generation	Japanese opening and ending themes
2006–2010	Pokémon: Diamond & Pearl	Japanese opening and ending themes
2010–2013	Pokémon: Best Wishes	Japanese opening and ending themes
2013–2016	Pokémon XY	Japanese opening and ending themes

Other works
Year	Title	Notes
2011	Play for Japan: The Album	composed "HVC-1384"
2017	Django	Original album
2020	Domingo	Original album
2021	Lost Tapes	Demo and prototype music
2021	Domani	Original album
