= Paper Airplane Chase =

2008 video game

- Title screen.
- Developer: Nintendo SPD
- Publisher: Nintendo
- Series: WarioWare
- Platform: Nintendo DSi
- Release: JP: December 24, 2008; PAL: April 3, 2009; NA: April 27, 2009
- Genre: Action
- Modes: Single-player, multiplayer

Paper Airplane Chase (Note: Japanese: 紙ヒコーキ, Hepburn: Kami Hikōki), known in PAL territories as Paper Plane, is an action game developed and published by Nintendo for the Nintendo DSi's DSiWare service. It is a spin-off of the WarioWare series, featuring an enhanced version of the minigame of the same name in WarioWare, Inc.: Mega Microgames!. It was released in Japan on December 24, 2008, in PAL territories on April 3, 2009 and in North America on April 27, 2009 for 200 DSi Points.

== Gameplay ==
There are three modes – the first is Endless, the original version included in Mega Microgames! which places the player in a randomly generated course, requiring him or her to guide a paper airplane through it as it descends, attempting to get as far down as possible; Time Attack, which places the player in pre-created tracks, requiring them to get down to a certain point as fast as possible; and Race Mode, a two-player competition that is played on one DSi, with one player using the d-pad and the other using the face buttons. There are a total of eight courses in the game.

== Reception ==
Ryan Zacher of Nintendo Life gave the game a 8/10 score, praising its pickup-and-play form factor and low price point alongside the newly added modes. In contrast, Mark Bozon of IGN gave the game a 5/10 score, criticizing the game for its shallow gameplay and lack of content.
