= Space Firebird =

1980 video game

- US arcade flyers by Nintendo (left) and Sega-Gremlin (right)
- Developer(s): Nintendo R&D1; Ikegami Tsushinki
- Publisher(s): JP/EU: Nintendo; NA: Far East Video; NA: Sega-Gremlin
- Designer(s): Genyo Takeda
- Artist(s): Shigeru Miyamoto
- Composer(s): Hirokazu Tanaka
- Platform(s): Arcade game
- Release: JP: July 1980; NA: October 1980; EU: 1980
- Genre(s): Action, Shooter
- Mode(s): Single-player, multiplayer

Space Firebird (Note: Japanese: スペースファイアーバード) is a 1980 arcade video game developed by Nintendo R&D1 and released by Nintendo in Japan and Europe. In America, the game was distributed by Far East Video. Sega-Gremlin also released a version of the game in North America.

== Gameplay ==
Players guide a ship through deep space while encountering spherical objects that appear to look like a bunch of comets or shooting stars. They suddenly shapeshift into large creatures called Firebirds as the player gets closer to them and start attacking the ship in ever more complex looping formations. As a Space Ship Commander, players must seek out and destroy three kinds of Firebirds in three missions. The names of the Firebirds are Gulls, Eagles and the Mighty Emperor (or simply "Emperor"). The Emperor is destroyed by four hits, the Eagle with two hits and the Gull with one hit. The Eagles drop bombs that are aimed at sabotaging the ship controlled by players. When hit, the bomb scatters deadly shrapnel. To avoid this from happening, players must destroy the bomb from directly beneath it before it crashes. Besides shooting missiles, the main ship also uses the warp mode that can only be used once in every level to escape impending danger and/or to strike out at a flock of birdlike creatures. When activated, the ship thrusts into space with a protective shield that deflects enemy fire and makes the ship invincible. Players also use this for close range combat.

Shooting every Firebird in a wave awards 1000 points and displays a "Perfect!" message.

== Legacy ==
A year later, a remake of Space Firebird titled Space Demon (Note: Japanese: スペース デーモン) was released by Fortrek. In this arcade game, a spacecraft larger than the one in Space Firebird becomes lost and falls victim to the horrifying Space Demon and its accomplices. Players have to battle their way through the Demon's forces by shooting all of the satanic enemies including the Space Demon itself as they appear on the screen. Like Space Firebird, Space Demon also allowed players to make the main ship dodge from left to right and use the Warp Shield once every mission to zoom ahead and take out enemies by ramming into them.
