= Makoto Kano =

Makoto Kano is the name of:

- Makoto Kano (figure skater) (born 1966), Japanese figure skater
- Makoto Kano (video game designer) (born 1950), Nintendo employee
