= Monkey Magic (video game) =

1979 video game

- Arcade flyer
- Developers: Nintendo R&D1; Ikegami Tsushinki
- Publisher: Nintendo
- Designer: Nintendo
- Platform: Arcade
- Release: December 1979
- Genre: Breakout
- Mode: Single-player

Monkey Magic (Note: Japanese: モンキー・マジック) is a 1979 arcade game released by Nintendo exclusively in Japan. The game is a Breakout clone, and one of Nintendo's earliest arcade games. Ikegami Tsushinki did design work on the game. Players control a paddle to hit the ball at a large number of blocks shaping a monkey's face. To win, the player must destroy the entire face of the monkey. Players can earn points by catching blocks that fall, and hitting the ball in different places.
