= WarioWare, Inc.: Mega Microgames! =

2003 video game

- European box art
- Developer: Nintendo R&D1
- Publisher: Nintendo
- Director: Hirofumi Matsuoka
- Producer: Takehiro Izushi
- Designers: Ko Takeuchi; Goro Abe; Ryutaro Takahashi
- Programmer: Kazuyoshi Osawa
- Artist: Ko Takeuchi
- Composers: Ryoji Yoshitomi; Kyoko Miyamoto
- Series: Wario
- Platform: Game Boy Advance
- Release: JP: March 21, 2003; EU: May 23, 2003; NA: May 26, 2003; AU: June 6, 2003
- Genre: Action
- Modes: Single-player, multiplayer

WarioWare, Inc.: Mega Microgames!, (Note: Known in Japan as Made in Wario (Japanese: メイド イン ワリオ, Hepburn: Meido in Wario)) known as WarioWare, Inc.: Minigame Mania in PAL regions, is a 2003 action game developed and published by Nintendo for the Game Boy Advance. The debut title in the WarioWare series, the game is about rapid completion of "microgames", short minigames given to the player consecutively and with increasing speed per each game complete. The game's concept was inspired by the "Sound Bomber" mode of Mario Artist: Polygon Studio for the Nintendo 64DD. Many of the music tracks and sound effects (including Wario's voice clips) were recycled from Wario Land 4. The game was produced by Takehiro Izushi and directed by Hirofumi Matsuoka. Matsuoka was also the director of Polygon Studio. Mega Microgames! was released in 2003; in Japan in March, in North America and Europe in May and in Australia in June.

Upon its release, WarioWare, Inc.: Mega Microgames! received critical acclaim, winning GameSpot's Editor's Choice Award and Most Innovative Game Award of 2003, among other awards. It is also revered as one of the greatest games of all time. The game went on to receive a multiplayer-focused remake called WarioWare, Inc.: Mega Party Games! on the GameCube. The game went on to spawn the WarioWare series of video games, which all have the same formula of gameplay as the debut title, with the exception of Game & Wario. "Pyoro" and "Paper Plane", two bonus minigames that appear in Mega Microgames!, were reworked into two full titles for the DSiWare service as Bird & Beans and Paper Airplane Chase, respectively. In addition, some of the microgames featured in Mega Microgames! also return in the ninth installment, WarioWare Gold. The game has also been re-released through the Virtual Console on Wii U, the Ambassador Program on Nintendo 3DS and on the Nintendo Classics service.

== Gameplay ==
The microgame "The Legend of Zelda" from 9-Volt's stage, referencing The Legend of Zelda. 9-Volt's stage's theme is "Nintendo Classics".

WarioWare's core gameplay principles revolve around the concept of "microgames", fast-paced minigames that must be completed within a demanding time limit. Mega Microgames! features over 210 microgames across nine stages hosted by Wario and his companions, each centered around themes such as sports, nature and classic Nintendo games, as well as remix stages that feature microgames from previous stages. In each stage, microgames appear consecutively, presenting the player with a simple prompt with which to clear the microgame. Failing a microgame, either by losing the game or running out of time, one of four lives will be deducted, with the stage ending once the player runs out of lives. As the player keeps playing, the game speeds up, making microgames' time limits shorter and forcing the player to complete them faster. At the end of a set number of microgames, the player must complete a "boss stage"; a longer microgame without a set time limit. When playing a stage for the first time, players are simply required to clear enough microgames and defeat the boss stage without running out of lives, which unlocks the next stage or set of stages. If a stage has already been cleared once, players will instead play for a high score, seeing how many microgames they can clear before running out of lives. Players can regain one of their lost lives by defeating boss battles, but the difficulty and speed of the microgames further increase the longer the player manages to survive. In addition to the main stages, players can unlock various minigames by clearing certain unlock conditions in-game. These games include high score challenges such as a jump rope minigame, competitive games which can be played with two players using the same system, and Wario-fied versions of Dr. Mario and Sheriff.

== Development and release ==

Many of the games featured in Mario Artist: Polygon Studio were later re-tooled into microgames for WarioWare, Inc.: Mega Microgames!.

WarioWare's inception began during the development of Mario Artist: Polygon Studio, a successor to Mario Paint being developed for the Nintendo 64DD; a game where players could create and animate fully polygonal three-dimensional models. A feature of Polygon Studio was a mode called "Sound Bomber", where the player completes rapid consecutive "microgames". This concept would be reused and fleshed out for the first WarioWare title. In addition, many of the minigames in Polygon Studio bear heavy resemblance to some microgames found in Mega Microgames!.

The development team used post-it notes in order to come up with microgame ideas; whenever someone had an idea for a microgame, they would write it down on a note and stick it to the director's table. The game became well known around the department, as other members not actively working on the game contributed ideas of their own in the hopes that the development team would be receptive. Microgames that were too obscene or "too Japanese" were cut to make sure all people playing could understand the game. As individual programmers coded individual microgames, each microgame has a vastly different visual style.

Made in Wario, as the game is known in Japan, was originally made secretly by a number of developers on the development team Nintendo R&D1 without telling their manager at the time. The people came up with the idea of using Wario as its mascot since they could not think of anyone else who would best be suited for the game. According to Yoshio Sakamoto, Wario was chosen as the game's protagonist as he "is always doing stupid things and is really idiotic".

Shigeru Miyamoto put a lot of thought into how best to market the game. He wanted to show how its unusual playing style made it distinct from other games, in the way it could be simply picked up and enjoyed. Miyamoto gave the staff the approval to use the slogan "More! Shorter! Faster!" (最多 最短 最速 Saita Saitan Saisoku), which prominently appeared on the Japanese box art, surpassing the actual game logo in terms of size. It was not used for Western packaging, which instead depicted the WarioWare cast rather than just a portion of Wario's face as seen on the Japanese counterpart.

== Reception ==
Reception

Aggregate score
| Aggregator | Score |
|---|---|
| Metacritic | 89/100 |

Review scores
| Publication | Score |
|---|---|
| Eurogamer | 9/10 |
| Game Informer | 7.5/10 |
| GameSpot | 9.1/10 |
| GameSpy | 95/100 |
| IGN | 9/10 |
| Nintendo Life | 9/10 |
| Nintendo Power | 4.6/5 |
| Nintendo World Report | 9.5/10 |

Mega Microgames! has won numerous awards and received critical acclaim. It was voted the winner of the Edge Award at the Edinburgh International Games Festival in 2004 by a panel of videogames industry members, academics, and journalists.

At GameSpot, it was awarded the Editor's Choice Award, "Game Boy Advance Game of the Month" prize and was nominated for its "Best and Worst" of 2003 in the "Most Innovative Game" category.

Reviewers wrote enthusiastically about the game. Jeff Gerstmann from GameSpot gave it a 9.1 out of 10 and praised the game for its portability, being able to play it in "short bursts" and being able to return to it again and again. Craig Harris from IGN said that the sheer number of minigames, its simplicity, and replay value made the game original and great, and gave it a 9.0.

Edge ranked the game #40 on its list of "The 100 Best Games To Play Today", stating "almost every minigame is a masterclass in how to instantly captivate with clear goals and a captivating alchemy of sound, image and control". The game was ranked 138th in Electronic Gaming Monthly's "The Greatest 200 Video Games of Their Time" in 2006. Official Nintendo Magazine ranked the game 78th on a list of greatest Nintendo games.

== Remakes and re-releases ==
=== WarioWare, Inc.: Mega Party Games! ===
Mega Microgames! was remade for the GameCube as WarioWare, Inc.: Mega Party Games!, as a more multiplayer focused game than the original. The game features all of the same microgames as the Game Boy Advance version, but the microgames are set up in competitive environments for two to four players rather than an environment for one player.

=== Virtual Console ===
In December 2011, Mega Microgames! and nine other Game Boy Advance games were released on the Nintendo 3DS' Virtual Console as part of Nintendo's Ambassador Program for early adopters that purchased and registered their 3DS systems prior to the console's first major price cut in their home markets. The game was later released on the Wii U's Virtual Console on April 3, 2014, in Japan and April 10 in North America and Europe. In 2023, the game was re-released on the Nintendo Classics service.
