= Sky Skipper =

1981 video game

- Japanese arcade flyer
- Developers: Nintendo R&D1; Ikegami Tsushinki
- Publishers: Nintendo; Parker Brothers (2600)
- Designers: Genyo Takeda; Shigeru Miyamoto
- Platforms: Arcade, Atari 2600
- Release: Arcade: JP: July 1981; 2600: April 1983
- Genre: Action
- Modes: Single-player, multiplayer

Sky Skipper (Note: Japanese: スカイスキッパー, Hepburn: Sukai Sukippā) is a 1981 action video game developed and published by Nintendo for arcades. The player pilots a biplane and must save animals and a royal family from gorillas holding them captured. This is done by dropping bombs on the gorillas to knock them out and unlock the cages, then diving down towards the cages to pick up the freed characters before the gorillas lock the cages again.

The game was poorly received in location testing and was never widely released; despite this, an Atari 2600 port was released by Parker Brothers in 1983 in North America. The cabinets were converted into Popeye machines for release the following year. Nintendo of America stored one cabinet in its archives which is now the only known Sky Skipper cabinet remaining in the world. The cabinet was scanned and photographed by arcade enthusiasts in 2016, who also sourced one of four known remaining Sky Skipper arcade boards to build a faithful cabinet restoration. The board from the Nintendo of America cabinet is the only known unmodified boardset of the game. Hamster Corporation were able to reference the only known working Sky Skipper arcade board in Japan via the cooperation of exA-Arcadia and used the ROM image from this board to release it on the Nintendo Switch eShop under license from Nintendo in 2018 as part of the Arcade Archives series.

== Gameplay ==
A player attacks a gorilla (arcade version).

In Sky Skipper, the player pilots a biplane through scrolling mazes to save animals caged by enemy gorillas. The player must drop bombs onto the gorillas which will temporarily knock them out and unlock the cages. Then, the player must swoop down to pick up the animals before the gorillas get up and lock the cages again. Flying into a gorilla or wall destroys the plane, resulting in the loss of one life. The plane's fuel gauge goes down while flying, and is replenished by picking up the animals. There are four stages in total, which are repeated on increased difficulty.

== Development and release ==
In 1981, Nintendo developed and released Sky Skipper in Japan; the game was produced alongside Nintendo's highly successful Donkey Kong arcade game, with both titles releasing in July of the same year. It was designed by Genyo Takeda and Shigeru Miyamoto with assistance from the company Ikegami Tsushinki, a company that helped Nintendo program many of their early arcade games. The cabinets were produced in upright, cabaret, and cocktail variations with cabinet artwork done by Miyamoto. The game performed poorly in test markets in Japan and was not widely released there. Around a dozen cabinets were sent to Nintendo of America in Redmond, Washington for location tests, but the game was poorly received there, too, and was never widely released in America. Because of the poor reception, Nintendo converted the Sky Skipper cabinets into Popeye, released in 1982. One of the ten North American cabinets escaped this fate and was put in storage at Nintendo of America.

Although the game was never widely released in North America, Parker Brothers negotiated for a license to publish a home version of the game for the Atari 2600 as part of its licensing deal for Popeye. The port was naturally of lower production value than the arcade version.

During E3 2018, Nintendo revealed the impending release of Sky Skipper on the Nintendo Switch eShop in July under Hamster Corporation's Arcade Archives series, after numerous arcade games from Nintendo was released in the series. The ROM image for the game had been copied from the board in the cabinet at Nintendo of America because it is the only known unmodified boardset. According to Nintendo World Report, the rerelease may have taken years to come to fruition due to legal issues with Ikegami Tsushinki.

== Reception ==
Reviewing the Switch release, both Nintendo World Report and Nintendo Life said the game was enjoyable when playing for a high score, but it lacked variety. Nintendo Life enjoyed "striking a balance between completing the levels quickly and plotting a route to maximise your point-scoring." Nintendo World Report did not like how the game repeated the same few stages and felt as though the game was not finished. They also panned the stage graphics, calling them "extremely crude" compared to Donkey Kong. Nintendo Life agreed in that the colors were garish in places and the environments were blocky, writing this: "The simple design and plain backgrounds ensure everything is easy to follow, but Sky Skipper certainly shows its age." Both praised the extra options included with the Arcade Archives release.

Having played the original arcade version, Nintendo of America's gameplay tester Howard Philips called Sky Skipper a "confusing thematic mess" akin to an LSD trip.

Atari HQ found the vintage Atari 2600 port to be average in quality, with simple gameplay and unremarkable graphics and sound.

== Preservation efforts ==
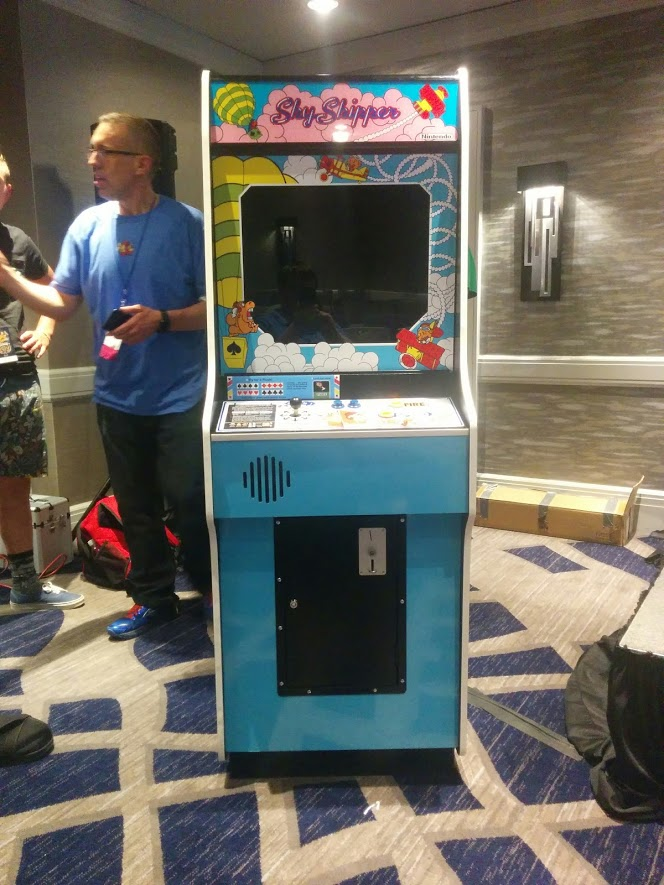

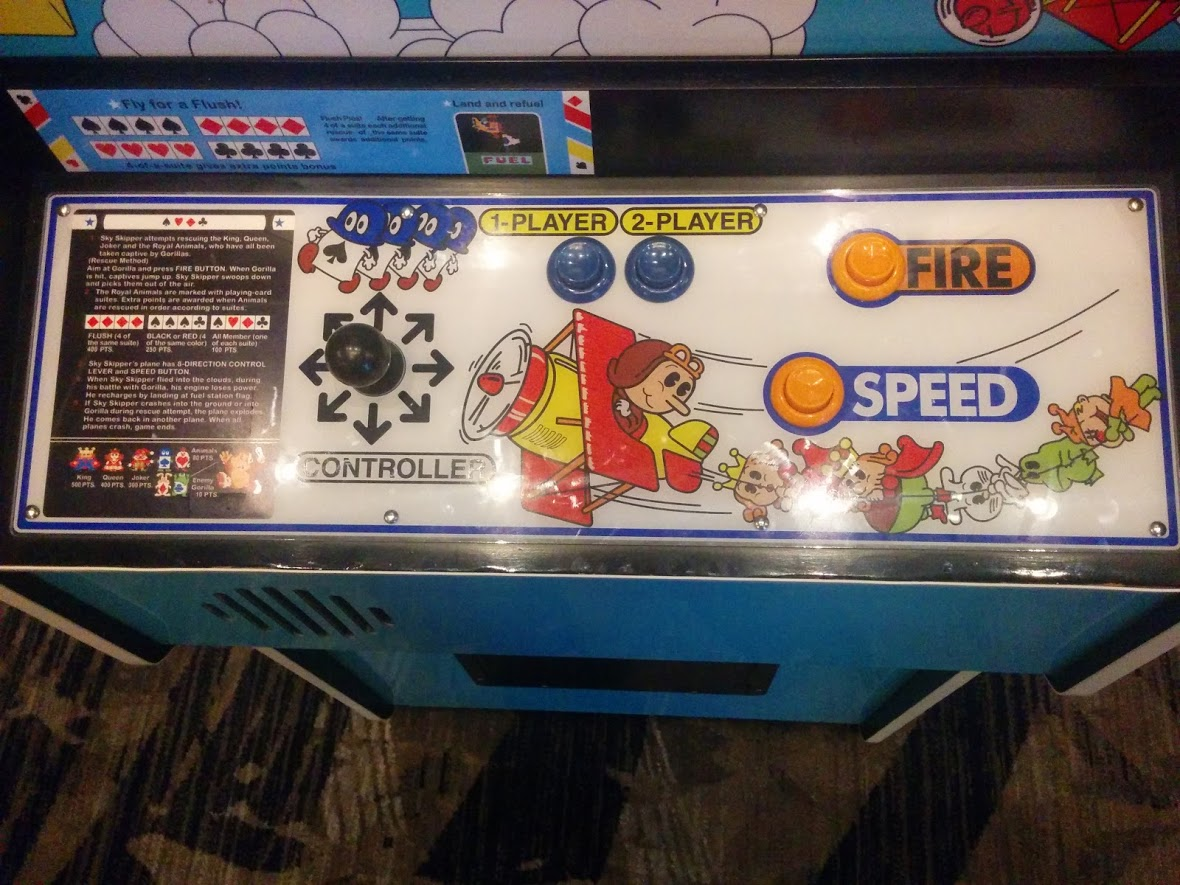
The restored Sky Skipper cabinet on display in 2017

Julian Eggebrecht, founder of game developer Factor 5, made a deal with Nintendo that if he was able to ship Star Wars Rogue Squadron II: Rogue Leader (2001) on schedule, he could borrow their Sky Skipper cabinet for his company's arcade. Factor 5 shipped Rogue Leader on time and so received the machine. One of the ROM chips was dead, so they contacted Genyo Takeda who pulled the original files from Nintendo's archives, enabling Eggebrecht to repair the machine.

In 2016, a group of arcade restoration enthusiasts decided to build a restored Sky Skipper cabinet. No complete cabinets were known to exist in private collections. Four boards owned by collectors, containing Popeye ROMs, were known to have been converted from Sky Skipper based on their serial numbers. Using ROM images available online, they converted a board to Sky Skipper. To get information on the cabinet, they asked video game player Billy Mitchell to connect with Nintendo of America. Nintendo said they still had a Sky Skipper cabinet and granted them access to examine it. With the scans they took, and sourcing one of the four known boards, they were able to create a recreation of the arcade game in Nintendo of America's archives.
