= Heli Fire =

1980 video game

- Arcade flyer
- Developers: Nintendo R&D1; Ikegami Tsushinki
- Publisher: Nintendo
- Composer: Hirokazu Tanaka
- Platform: Arcade
- Release: JP: September 1980
- Genre: Fixed shooter
- Modes: Single-player, multiplayer

Heli Fire (Note: Japanese: ヘリファイア, Hepburn: Heri Faia) is a 1980 fixed shooter video game developed by and published by Nintendo for arcades. Some sources claim that Ikegami Tsushinki also did design work on the game. Similar to Taito's Polaris (1980), players control a submarine and must survive as long as possible against a barrage of enemy attacks from the sea and above.

Heli Fire was manufactured in both upright and cocktail arcade cabinets. It uses color raster graphics on a Sanyo 20-DZC monitor. The game can be played with one player or two players who alternate turns. The sound, provided by Hirokazu Tanaka, consists of one amplified monoural channel.

== Gameplay ==
Screenshot

The submarine can move in eight directions and can defend itself with missiles. While ships and mines attack the submarine from the water, enemy helicopters, which come in four different colors that designate their speed, drop missiles and depth charges at the submarine from the air. Each level consists of three sets of ten helicopters (for a total of 30) which must be destroyed within a specified time limit, or else they start to attack in a "special assault pattern". After a certain number of helicopters are destroyed, the submarine resurfaces, and a native girl dances (called "dancers of the isles") on top of the submarine while bonus points are awarded. After each level, the water level rises, placing the submarine closer to the helicopters and underwater traps.

== Reception ==
According to Florent Gorges' book The History of Nintendo, Heli Fire, "for once, really put the players' skills to the test"; he explained that players had to dodge attacks from the air as well as pay attention to what is in the water in order to avoid ships and mines.
