= Popeye (video game) =

1982 video game

- North American arcade flyer
- Developers: Nintendo R&D1; Ikegami Tsushinki; (Note: NES version developed by Nintendo R&D1; ports developed by Parker Brothers.)
- Publishers: Nintendo: Arcade; JP/NA: Nintendo; EU/UK: Atari, Inc. Famicom/NES Nintendo Ports Parker Brothers
- Designers: Genyo Takeda; Shigeru Miyamoto
- Series: Popeye
- Platform: Arcade: NES, Atari 2600, ColecoVision, Intellivision, Atari 5200, Atari 8-bit, VIC-20, Odyssey², TI-99/4A, Commodore 64
- Release: November 18, 1982: Arcade; NA: November 18, 1982; JP: December 1982; EU: Late 1982 NES; JP: July 15, 1983; NA: June 1986; EU: 1987 2600, ColecoVision, Intellivision; August 1983 5200, Atari 8-bit, VIC-20; November 1983 Odyssey²; 1983 TI-99/4A; February 1984 C64; April 1984
- Genre: Platform
- Modes: Single-player, multiplayer

Popeye (Note: Japanese: ポパイ, Hepburn: Popai) is a 1982 platform game developed and published by Nintendo for arcades. It is based on the comic strip of the same name created by E. C. Segar and licensed from King Features Syndicate. Some sources claim that Ikegami Tsushinki did programming work on the game. As Popeye, the player must collect objects thrown by Olive Oyl from the top of the screen while being chased by Brutus. Popeye can punch bottles thrown at him but can only hurt Brutus after eating the one can of spinach present in each level. Unlike Nintendo's earlier game Donkey Kong (1981), there is no jump button.

The game was licensed by Atari, Inc. for exclusive release in the United Kingdom and Ireland in an Atari-designed cabinet. Nintendo ported the game to the Famicom, and Parker Brothers published versions for other home systems.

== Gameplay ==
The title screen and first level are in the top row. Level 2 and 3 are below (arcade).

Popeye is a platform game with three screens. The object of the game is for Popeye the Sailor to collect a certain number of items dropped by Olive Oyl, depending on the level—24 hearts, 16 musical notes, or 24 letters in the word "HELP"—while avoiding the Sea Hag, Brutus, and other dangers. The player can make Popeye walk back and forth and up and down stairs and ladders with a 4-way joystick. There is a punch button but, unlike similar games of the time, no jump button.

Brutus chases Popeye and can go down a level, reach to the next lower level, and jump up to hit Popeye if he is directly above. Popeye can attack Brutus after eating the can of spinach found in each level. Spinach makes Popeye invincible for a short time, during which Brutus runs away and can be temporarily knocked out simply by running into him, and doubles the point value of items dropped by Olive until its effects wear off.

Popeye punches to destroy harmful items such as bottles, vultures, and skulls. He loses a life when hit by Brutus or any flying object, or if he fails to collect a dropped item within a certain time after it reaches the bottom of the screen. On the first screen of each cycle, Popeye can hit a punching bag to knock a bucket off a hook. If it falls on Brutus's head, he becomes stunned for several seconds and the player earns a score bonus.

Other licensed Popeye characters in the game are Olive Oyl, Swee'Pea, and Wimpy.

== Development ==
Popeye was designed by Genyo Takeda and Shigeru Miyamoto. Nintendo had originally intended to make a video game based on the Popeye characters, but had trouble accurately depicting them. The characters of Mario, Donkey Kong, and Pauline were developed as replacements for use in Donkey Kong (1981).

After the success of Donkey Kong, Nintendo revived plans for a Popeye game, partly as a replacement for their unreleased 1981 game Sky Skipper.

== Ports ==
Parker Brothers ported the game to the Atari 8-bit computers, Atari 2600, Atari 5200, Intellivision, Commodore 64, TI-99/4A, and ColecoVision. It is one of the few games ported to the Magnavox Odyssey².

On July 15, 1983, Popeye became one of the three launch games for the Famicom, along with Donkey Kong and Donkey Kong Jr..

== Reception ==
In the United States, Popeye topped the Play Meter arcade chart for street locations in April 1983.

Electronic Games wrote in 1983 the arcade version of Popeye at first appeared to be "yet another variation of a theme that's become all too familiar since Donkey Kong [...] But there are some nuances, not the least of which are the graphics and sound effects, that tend to allow the game the benefit of the doubt in execution. [...] Popeye does offer some interesting play that is more than complemented by the cosmetics." The Arcade Express newsletter scored it 7 out of 10 in January 1983, calling it "the closest thing to a videogame cartoon seen yet in an arcade", but also that "game play, unfortunately, doesn't come up to visual standards." Michael Pugliese writing for The Coin Slot described Popeye as "a visually stimulating and exciting game that will go well in any location [...] it contains all the challenges and character appeal to make it a solid earner for a long time." Computer and Video Games magazine gave the arcade game a generally favorable review.

Antic wrote that the Atari 8-bit version "is a thoroughly entertaining challenge for gamers of all ages" and its mechanics unique among climbing games gave it above-average replay value. Computer Games magazine gave the ColecoVision and home computer conversions an A rating, calling Popeye a "terrific cartoony climbing game, much better than Donkey Kong".

== Legacy ==
Popeye no Eigo Asobi is an English teaching spin-off for Famicom, released on November 22, 1983. A board game based on the video game was released by Parker Brothers in 1983.

In 2008, Namco Networks released an enhanced remake for mobile phones. The gameplay is largely the same, plus an enhanced mode with a bonus stage and an extra level that pays homage to the short A Dream Walking where Popeye must save Olive from sleepwalking. Tokens are earned to buy old comic strips.

On November 4, 2021, Popeye was released for the PS4 and Nintendo Switch as a 3D reimagining of the arcade game. It was met with poor Metacritic scores. It was delisted in 2023.

Ben Falls earned the world record score of 3,023,060 on December 20, 2011, according to the Twin Galaxies International Scoreboard.
