= Ikegami Tsushinki =

Japanese TV equipment manufacturer

Ikegami Tsushinki Co., Ltd.
- Type: Public
- Traded as: TYO: 6771
- Founded: 21 February 1948 (Private business founded on Sep.10, 1946)
- Headquarters: Ōta, Tokyo, Japan
- Products: Broadcast use TV camera systems, Broadcast color monitors, Broadcast video production and processing systems, Outside Broadcast Vans, Security Surveillance TV camera systems, Medical Electronic camera systems, Vision Inspection Equipment and systems.
- Number of employees: 700 (consolidated 878); *As of March, 2020
- Website: www.ikegami.co.jp

Ikegami Tsushinki Co., Ltd. (池上通信機株式会社, Ikegami Tsūshinki Kabushiki-gaisha) (TYO: 6771) is a Japanese manufacturer of professional and broadcast television equipment, especially professional video cameras, both for electronic news gathering and studio use. The company was founded in 1946.

== History ==
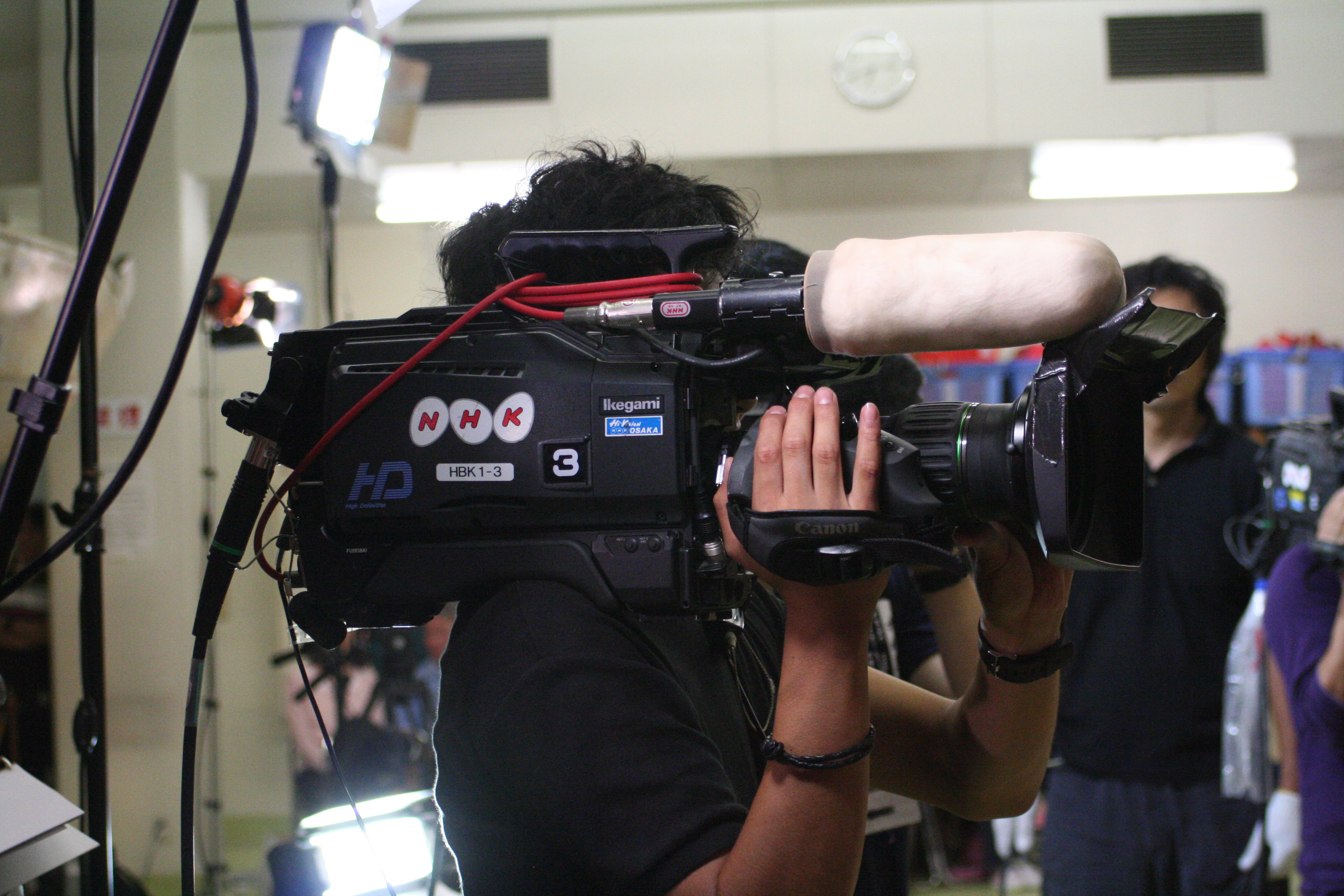
Ikegami high definition video camera of NHK Kobe

Ikegami introduced the first portable 4 1/2-inch Image Orthicon tube hand-held TV camera. The camera made its debut in the United States in February 1962, when CBS used it to document the launching of NASA's Friendship 7, its first crewed space mission to orbit the Earth. In 1972, Ikegami introduced the HL-33, the first compact hand-held color video camera for electronic news gathering (ENG). In 1976, the HL-77 was introduced, which was one of the first "one-piece" color video cameras, eliminating the required CCU "backpack" of the HL-33. The compact ENG cameras made live shots easier and—when combined with portable videotape recorders—provided an immediate alternative to 16mm television news film, which required processing before it could be broadcast. In addition to ENG, these cameras saw some use in outside broadcasts in Britain, particularly for roaming footage that was not possible to capture using the much larger tradition OB cameras. The later HL-51 was popular among broadcasters for both ENG and EFP image acquisition.

Later models would include the HL-79 series, first introduced in 1978 with the HL-79A and continuing into the 1980s with the later HL-79D and HL-79E models, as well as the HL-83 and the HL-95 "Unicam".

Although Ikegami is known as a manufacturer of high-quality television cameras, the company does not make video recorder mechanisms (VTRs), and was a licensee of professional video formats such as Sony's Betacam SP and DVCAM, and Panasonic's DVCPRO. In 1995, Ikegami co-operated with Avid on a tapeless video acquisition format called Editcam, but few were sold. Ikegami developed a tapeless camera format is called GFCAM Toshiba.

In the early 1980s, Ikegami developed arcade video games as a subcontractor to Japanese video game companies. Among the games they developed are Computer Othello, Block Fever, Monkey Magic, Congo Bongo, Popeye, Donkey Kong, Radar Scope, Sheriff, Space Fever, Space Firebird, Space Demon, Heli Fire, Sky Skipper, Space Launcher, and Zaxxon. At that time, computer programs were not recognized as copyrightable material. According to these sources, Ikegami proceeded to sue Nintendo for unauthorized duplication of the Donkey Kong program code for the latter's creation of Donkey Kong Junior (1983, Tokyo District Court), but it was not until 1989 that the Tokyo High Court gave a verdict that acknowledged the originality of program code. In 1990, Ikegami and Nintendo reached a settlement, terms of which were never disclosed.

== Products ==
Some Ikegami Models included the ITC (Industrial Television Camera)-730, HL-79 HL-55, HL-V55 and HL-99. Ikegami makes a full line of SDTV and HDTV TV cameras.

Many of the model numbers of Ikegami portable television cameras begin with the initial letters "HL", which stand for "Handy-Looky", an original translation from the Japanese.
