= Sheriff (video game) =

1979 video game

- European arcade flyer
- Developers: Nintendo R&D1; Ikegami Tsushinki
- Publishers: JP/EU: Nintendo; NA: Far East Video/Exidy; UK: Sega/Bell-Fruit Mfg.
- Designer: Genyo Takeda
- Artist: Shigeru Miyamoto
- Platform: Arcade
- Release: JP: October 1979; EU: November 1979; NA: November 1979
- Genre: Multidirectional shooter
- Modes: Single-player, multiplayer
- Arcade system: Nintendo 8080

Sheriff, (Note: Japanese: シェリフ, Hepburn: Sherifu) also known as Bandido in North America, is a 1979 multidirectional shooter video game developed and published by Nintendo for arcades. It is one of several Western-themed video games from the 1970s, along with Western Gun, Outlaw, and Boot Hill. The player controls a county sheriff tasked with defense of a town against bandits, to rescue the captured woman. It was a commercial success in Japan, where it was among the top ten highest-grossing arcade games of 1979.

== Gameplay ==
Screenshot

The game's concept is Nintendo's first damsel in distress theme, predating Donkey Kong (1981). The player controls Mr. Jack, (Note: Also referred to in certain releases as just 'The Sheriff') a sheriff, against a gang of attacking bandits, to defend the town and rescue Betty, the captured woman.

Sheriff distinctly features two separate controls: a joystick for movement, and a dial control for aiming and firing, a configuration unusual for arcade games and nonexistent in consoles at the time. The joystick moves the character and the dial aims and fires, each in eight separate directions, allowing Mr. Jack to walk in one direction while shooting in another. The movement joystick is set with a considerable time delay before moving.

16 bandits (also referred to as "gangs") surround the outer rim, marked by a dotted "fence". Bullets from either Mr. Jack or the bandits can destroy the fenceposts, and they can function as defensive walls or aiming obstacles for the player. Larger barriers also exist on the midpoint of each side of the screen, and bullets from either Mr. Jack or the bandits will slowly erode these. The top and bottom barriers display the current level number.

The basic action taken by the enemy bandits is to walk around the outer rim while firing bullets at Mr. Jack, but they will sometimes enter into the central area, along with a change in game music. Mr. Jack must avoid touching the bandits, dodge bullets, and shoot all 16 bandits to complete each level.

Occasionally, a condor flies along the top of the screen in much the same way as the UFO in Taito's Space Invaders. Shooting the condor awards the player a random amount of bonus points.

At the end of every round, a brief cutscene is shown. Depending on how many rounds the player has completed, this cutscene either shows Betty being chased by the bandits or reuniting with Mr. Jack. Whenever the latter is shown, the player's score is doubled.

== Development ==
The game was developed by Nintendo R&D1 in 1979, designed by Genyo Takeda with art by Shigeru Miyamoto. Some sources assert that Ikegami Tsushinki also did design work on Sheriff.

== Release ==
The game was originally released in two formats: an upright cabinet and a cocktail (tabletop) version. These versions were imported to Europe, Asia, and America. In America, the game was distributed by Far East Video.

In the UK, Sheriff was licensed for production and distribution by Bell-Fruit Manufacturing in an upright cabinet. Bell-Fruit's core product range at the time was fruit/slot machines. Sheriff (and later Puckman) marked the company's first, and short lived, diversification into the market of video games as licensee, so the cabinet design for this territory differs considerably from that of the Japanese version. Although it features the same marquee and bezel design, it shares many properties more commonly associated with slot machines, such as a lack of side art or cabinet decals. However, the game's title in this region remains unchanged as Sheriff.

In North America, the game was distributed by Exidy as Bandido. As was common practice for arcade games at the time, the game was sold as if it was Exidy's own creation, with all mentions of Nintendo being edited or removed. This version of the game renames Mr. Jack and Betty as "Our Hero" and "Pretty Priscilla" respectively.

A few rare and early prototype Sheriff arcades made and distributed with the help of Sega were shipped out to North America (mainly in Canada) to test market the game before Exidy obtained the rights and distributed the game as Bandido. These rare prototype arcades were hand converted from factory by Nintendo and Sega from previous Nintendo Space Fever B&W cocktail cabinets and were also the only instance of Sheriff featuring a black & white display.

A modified version of the game was released exclusively in Japan by Taito as Western Gun Part II. This version, which was framed as a sequel to Taito's 1975 game Western Gun, features edited graphics and replaces most of the game's music with portions of songs such as the theme to The Magnificent Seven and Oh My Darling, Clementine. It is unknown if this version of Sheriff was authorised by Nintendo.

== Reception ==
The game was a commercial success in Japan, where Sheriff was among the top ten highest-grossing arcade games of 1979.

In 2012, 1up wrote that Sheriff put Nintendo on the right track as a game developer.

== Legacy ==
In 2003 it was re-released as part of WarioWare, Inc.: Mega Microgames!, released for the Game Boy Advance. In WarioWare, Sheriff was included as both a microgame and as a minigame ("Wario's Sheriff") in which Wario takes the role of the sheriff. Standard controls apply to the microgame version, but in the minigame version, the L/R buttons can make the sheriff face in the opposite direction without moving. The time delay for moving the sheriff was removed, and the sheriff's walking speed is greatly increased from the original. When the player's points double after completing a certain number of levels, the sheriff also gains extra lives, considerably reducing the game's difficulty.

Mr. Jack has appeared in the Super Smash Bros. series starting with Super Smash Bros Melee, in which he appears as one of the many collectible Trophies in the game. Mr. Jack later returned in Super Smash Bros. for Nintendo 3DS and Wii U as an assist trophy where he fires a succession of eight bullets in a random order on the battlefield at the enemies of the summoner. He appears again as an Assist Trophy and Spirit in Super Smash Bros Ultimate.
