= Space Fever =

1979 arcade game

- Advertising flyer
- Developer(s): Nintendo R&D2; Ikegami Tsushinki
- Publisher(s): JP: Nintendo; NA: Far East Video
- Designer(s): Masayuki Uemura
- Artist(s): Shigeru Miyamoto
- Series: Space Fever
- Platform(s): Arcade
- Release: JP: February 1979; NA: 1979
- Genre(s): Fixed shooter
- Mode(s): Single-player, multiplayer

Space Fever (Note: Japanese: スペースフィーバー) is a 1979 arcade game developed and published by Nintendo. Some sources claim that Ikegami Tsushinki also did programming work on Space Fever. It was released in both monochrome and color versions. The gameplay is similar to Space Invaders, which had been released by Taito in 1978. In America, the game was distributed by Far East Video.

== Gameplay ==
Game-A mode

The gameplay of Space Fever is reminiscent of Space Invaders (1978), where the player controls a laser cannon situated at the bottom of the screen and must defeat waves of enemy aliens. The aliens are arranged in rows and slowly move to the edge of the screen, before descending and continuing in the opposite direction. As more aliens are defeated, they increase in speed. A UFO will occasionally appear towards the top of the screen, which can be shot down for bonus points. There are three game modes that change the way the aliens move; the first presents two formations of enemies that move in opposite directions, the second continuously adds additional rows of aliens, and the third is functionally identical to Space Invaders.

== Development ==
In the late 1970s, Nintendo Co., Ltd began shifting its focus away from its roots as a toy and playing card company towards the coin-operated entertainment market. Its decision was largely based on the 1973 oil crisis increasing the manufacturing costs for toys, and its need to diversify itself if it wanted to remain profitable. Nintendo had previously designed several electro-mechanical shooting gallery machines, such as the Laser Clay Shooting System and Wild Gunman. The company released its first video arcade game, Computer Othello, in June 1978. In the same month, Taito released Space Invaders, which triggered a nationwide resurgence in its video game market. This led to several manufacturers, including Nintendo, creating similar "Invader-type" games to try and capitalize on its popularity. Space Fever was one of its attempts, and was developed by Nintendo's Research & Development 2 (R&D2) division. Masayuki Uemura, the head of R&D2, led the development of the game. The programming and circuit design was contracted out to Ikegami Tsushinki, as were most of Nintendo's arcade games at the time.

Space Fever was released in Japan in February 1979. It was released as a tabletop arcade cabinet with a black and white raster monitor; a version featuring single-color graphics was released later in the year.

== Legacy ==
A special version of Space Fever called SF-Hisplitter (Note: Japanese: SFハイスプリッター) was released the same year and features aliens that are double the width of the standard variety, which can either be destroyed completely or split into two smaller aliens depending on where they are shot. This version is in color, and the shelter blocks are visually distinct from the monochrome version. Like with the original Space Fever, SF-Hisplitter was also distributed in America by Far East Video.

A sequel to Space Fever, titled Space Fever II, (Note: Japanese: スペースフィーバーII) is a minigame in the Game Boy Camera cartridge. The game also acts as a menu for selecting the other built-in minigames. It deviates from the Space Invaders formula, featuring instead smaller waves of individual aliens and bosses based on faces of Nintendo staff as well as the "game face" photo taken by the player.
