= RD1 (disambiguation) =

RD1 is a distant galaxy.

RD1 may also refer to:

- RD1, a wholly owned rural supplier of Fonterra
- RD1, one of the first Soviet rocket engine developed by Valentin Glushko

== See also ==
- R&D1
