= Koro Koro Puzzle Happy Panechu! =

2002 video game

- Developers: Nintendo R&D2; Mobile21
- Publisher: Nintendo
- Directors: Masayu Nakata; Hiroshi Okamoto
- Producer: Masayuki Uemura
- Composers: Kaori Takazou; Hirofumi Sano
- Platform: Game Boy Advance
- Release: JP: March 8, 2002
- Genre: Puzzle game
- Mode: Single player

Koro Koro Puzzle Happy Panechu! (コロコロパズル ハッピィパネッチュ!) is a puzzle video game developed by Nintendo R&D2 and Mobile21 and published by Nintendo for the Game Boy Advance. It was released only in Japan on March 8, 2002. It is the first Game Boy Advance title to use a tilt-sensor chip.

== Gameplay ==
In Koro Koro Puzzle Happy Panechu!, the basic strategy is to first fill the screen with colored blocks called Panechus and then make them disappear by making a group of Panechus in one color come together to fill up the bomb meter. Then combine the bombs into mega bombs to blow up the screen big time. The bomb meter is the blue dotted field in the bottom right. When players make Panechus disappear, they get black spots in this field, which will be turned into bombs the next time they press A. Players will try to make long combos for higher bomb scores. A combo is when players make Panechus disappear in a row without interruption. The player can hear how good they are doing by the shouts from the Panechus as they disappear. For some instances, a 1 combo will make them say "HAPPY", a 2+ combo will make them say "SO HAPPY", a 6+ combo will make them say "MEGA HAPPY" and so on. Players can see at the top of the bomb meter how many bonus bomb points they get (1+, 2+, 3+, 5+ etc.). If the field gets filled up, a "DANGER!!" alert will come up, and player get 10 seconds to clear things up or it is game over.

=== Modes ===
There are five different play modes to choose from.

- Block Battle – Players can set off bombs to send blocks to the AI opponents screen. The first person to get a completely cluttered screen loses. The left side will show players the opponent's status.
- Knock-Out Game – Players can blow up bombs next to the enemy platform in the middle to harm him, bigger bombs means more harm. The status bar to the left shows how much energy the enemy got left. The enemy will send magic blocks into the playing field to hinder you.
- IQ Puzzles – Players may clear the screen of Panechus in the least possible number of moves. Any Panechus left on the screen and the player loses. Unlike the other modes, players cannot make more Panechus appear with the A button and there are no bombs or bomb meter.
- High Score Game – Players can gather as many points as possible in the set time by blowing up big bombs.
- Time Challenge – Players must clear the screen in as short time as possible. The top right meter ticks up, and when it fills, new blocks falls onto the screen.

=== Items ===
Screenshot showing the Panechus in Koro Koro Puzzle Happy Panechu!

- Panechus – The cute little creatures with big lips. They come in four colors: pink, yellow, blue and green. When three or more of them in the same color come together, they vanish.
- Bombs – These black objects are important in the game. When they get together they stick to each other. Two or more sticking together can be blown up with the B button, erasing blocks or hurting enemies. Sticking four up in a square will make a big bomb, while sticking two big bombs together will make an even bigger bomb, and two of those will get players the largest bomb to create. Bigger bombs means more firepower.
- Hindering Blocks (Grey) – These are mainly in the way. They can be single blocks, or longer rows. They do not stick together, and can be blown up with bombs. The bombs must touch the block directly to blow it up.
- Magic Blocks (Transparent) – These are pretty much the same as the Hindering Blocks, except they are nice and transparent looking. These only appear in the Knock-Out mode.
- Diamonds – These are rare objects. When blown up with the B button, they make all blocks on screen vanish. Players can make them appear by shutting a Panechu up inside a big bomb (make a 3×3 bomb with a Panechu in the middle).
- IQ Mode Blocks – There are three kinds of blocks in this mode: IQ-Panechu (Big nose), which works like a normal Panechu; Wall Block (Nostrils), which forms a rigid block when stuck together; and IQ-Hinder Block (Grey Sleeping), which gets in the way.

=== Reversing the Tilt Sensor ===
It is possible to reverse the tilt sensor to be able to properly play it on a Game Boy Advance SP.

In the menu, users may go to "option" (rightmost green Panechu) then choose the blue "tilt sensitivity" one. On this screen, users may press and hold first up, then L, then R, and finally B. After this, they should receive a confirmation message accompanied by a little chime.

Users might want to reconfigure their sensitivity back to where it was since pressing up changed it.

== See also ==
- Kirby Tilt 'n' Tumble
- WarioWare: Twisted!
- Yoshi's Universal Gravitation
