= Clu Clu Land =

1984 video game

- North American NES box art
- Developer: Nintendo R&D1
- Publisher: Nintendo
- Composer: Akito Nakatsuka
- Platforms: NES, arcade, Famicom Disk System, Sharp Zaurus, Nintendo e-Reader, Game Boy Advance
- Release: November 22, 1984: NES; JP: November 22, 1984; NA: October 18, 1985; EU: February 15, 1987 Arcade (VS. Clu Clu Land); JP: December 1984 Famicom Disk System; JP: April 28, 1992 Zaurus; JP: September 2001 e-Reader; NA: April 21, 2003 Game Boy Advance; JP: May 21, 2004
- Genre: Puzzle
- Modes: Single-player, multiplayer
- Arcade system: Nintendo VS. System

Clu Clu Land (Note: Japanese: クルクルランド, Hepburn: Kurukuru Rando) is a 1984 puzzle video game developed and published by Nintendo for the Nintendo Entertainment System. It was released in 1984 in Japan for the Family Computer, in North America in 1985 as a launch title for the NES, and in Europe in 1987. It was ported to the Famicom Disk System in Japan and to arcades via the Nintendo VS. System as VS. Clu Clu Land. The game was later re-released on the Virtual Console for the Nintendo 3DS and Wii U, as well as the Nintendo Classics service.

== Title ==
Although "Clu Clu Land" is the official English title for the game, "Clu Clu" is actually an anglicization of "Kuru Kuru", a Japanese onomatopoeia that refers to something going "around and around". This is derived from the main gameplay mechanic, in which Bubbles (the protagonist) moves around mazes via grabbing onto poles, hence spinning "around and around". The same phrase is also the basis for the title of the Game Boy Advance game Kuru Kuru Kururin and its subsequent sequels.

== Gameplay ==
NES version, showing Bubbles (red), Unira (blue), and treasures

The player controls a female balloonfish named Bubbles, known as Gloopy (Note: Japanese: グルッピー, Hepburn: Guruppī) in Japan, who swims around in a maze trying to uncover all the golden Ingots.

The story starts with a type of sea urchin, the Unira, stealing all the treasures in the underwater kingdom of Clu Clu Land. Bubbles, the heroine, sets out to retrieve the treasure. The objective is to uncover all the gold ingots in each stage while avoiding the Unira and Black Holes. Ingots usually take the shape of a heart or a mushroom. The only way Bubbles can turn around to change directions is by means of Turning Posts located throughout the stages. She can stun the Unira by using a Sound Wave. When they are stunned, she can push them into a wall to get rid of them and receive points. If Bubbles is hurt by the Unira, she will lose a life. A life is also lost if she falls into a Black Hole, or if time runs out. The game ends when Bubbles has lost all her lives.

In later levels, the player must pass over the ingots an odd number of times to uncover them, as they alternate between their uncovered and dull sides.

== Ports ==
An expanded edition known as VS. Clu Clu Land (Note: Japanese: VSクルクルランド, Hepburn: VS Kurukuru Rando) was released for the arcade Nintendo VS. System. It contains twice as many puzzles, a new enemy named Boss Unira, different level themes, and other adjustments. A port of this version was released as the final game for the Family Computer Disk System (FDS), titled Clu Clu Land: Welcome to New Clu Clu Land. It contains a few minor enhancements, such as difficulty selection.

In September 2001, a port was released for the Sharp Zaurus series of PDAs.

The game was re-released in 2004 for Game Boy Advance as part of the Famicom Mini series.

== Reception ==
In a June 1986 survey of the NES catalogue, the Chicago Tribune's Steven Kosek and Dennis Lynch singled out Clu Clu Land and Ice Climber for "[keeping their] interest after repeated plays".

== Legacy ==
Various elements from Clu Clu Land appear throughout the Super Smash Bros. series. Bubbles appear as a trophy in Melee, and the Unira enemy appears as an item in the series from Brawl onwards. A medley of various tracks from the original game can be selected as background music for several stages in several games in the series, and Bubbles and Unira are featured as Spirits in Ultimate.

Bubbles appears as an unlockable playable character in DK: King of Swing, which features gameplay inspired by Clu Clu Land.

WarioWare: Smooth Moves and Twisted! both include microgames based on Clu Clu Land.

Both the NES and FDS versions are unlockable in the first Animal Crossing, with the latter retitled Clu Clu Land D outside Japan. It was playable in its Nintendo Space World 2000 demo and in the final game. Clu Clu Land is included in the NES Remix series. Hamster Corporation released the game as part of the Arcade Archives series for the Nintendo Switch in 2018.

Bubbles is playable in Super Mario Maker, appearing as one of the Costume Mario characters.
