= Metroid (video game) =

1986 video game

- North American NES box art
- Developers: Nintendo R&D1; Intelligent Systems
- Publisher: Nintendo
- Director: Satoru Okada
- Producer: Gunpei Yokoi
- Programmers: Hiroyuki Yukami; Yase Sobajima; Toshio Sengoku; Kenji Imai
- Artists: Hiroji Kiyotake; Hirofumi Matsuoka; Yoshio Sakamoto
- Writer: Makoto Kano
- Composer: Hirokazu Tanaka
- Series: Metroid
- Platforms: Famicom Disk System, arcade, NES, Game Boy Advance
- Release: August 6, 1986: Famicom Disk System; JP: August 6, 1986 Arcade; NA: July 1987 NES; NA: August 1987; EU: January 1988 Game Boy Advance; JP: August 10, 2004; NA: October 25, 2004; EU: January 7, 2005
- Genre: Action-adventure
- Mode: Single-player
- Arcade system: PlayChoice-10

Metroid (Note: Japanese: メトロイド, Hepburn: Metoroido) is a 1986 action-adventure game developed and published by Nintendo. The first installment in the Metroid series, it was originally released in Japan for the Family Computer Disk System in August 1986. North America received a release in August 1987 on the Nintendo Entertainment System, with the European release following in January 1988. Set on the planet Zebes, the story follows Samus Aran as she attempts to retrieve the predatory Metroid organisms that were stolen by Space Pirates, who plan to replicate the Metroids by exposing them to beta rays and then use them as biological weapons to destroy Samus and all who oppose them.

The game was developed by Nintendo Research & Development 1 (Nintendo R&D1) and Intelligent Systems. It was produced by Gunpei Yokoi, directed by Satoru Okada and Masao Yamamoto, and scored by Hirokazu Tanaka. It pioneered the Metroidvania genre, focusing on exploration and searching for power-ups used to reach previously inaccessible areas. Its varied endings for fast completion times made it an early popular title for speedrunning. It was also lauded for being one of the first video games to showcase a female protagonist.

Metroid was both a critical and commercial success. Reviewers praised its graphics, soundtrack, and tight controls. Nintendo Power ranked it 11th on their list of the best games for a Nintendo console. On Top 100 Games lists, it was ranked 7th by Game Informer and 69th by Electronic Gaming Monthly, and has been considered one of the best video games of all time. The game has been rereleased multiple times onto other Nintendo systems, such as the Game Boy Advance in 2004, the Wii, Wii U, and 3DS via the Virtual Console service, and the Nintendo Switch via the Nintendo Classics service. An enhanced remake of Metroid featuring updated visuals and gameplay, Metroid: Zero Mission, was released for the Game Boy Advance in 2004.

== Gameplay ==
In the Metroid screenshot, Samus Aran is seen jumping up while enemy creatures fly down toward her. The numerical health meter (energy) is in the upper-left corner, marked by "EN".

Metroid is an action-adventure game in which the player controls Samus Aran in sprite-rendered two-dimensional landscapes. The game takes place on the planet Zebes, a large, open-ended world with areas connected by doors and elevators. The player controls Samus as she travels through the planet's caverns and hunts Space Pirates. She begins with a weak power beam as her only weapon, and with only the ability to jump. The player explores more areas and collects power-ups that grant Samus special abilities and enhance her armor and weaponry, allowing her to enter areas that were previously inaccessible. Among the power-ups that are included in the game are the Morph Ball, which allows Samus to curl into a ball to roll into tunnels; the Bomb, which can only be used while in ball form and can open hidden floor/wall paths; and the Screw Attack, a somersaulting move that destroys enemies in its path.

In addition to common enemies, Samus encounters two bosses, Kraid and Ridley, whom she must defeat in order to progress. Ordinary enemies typically yield additional energy or ammunition when destroyed, and the player can increase Samus's carrying capacities by finding energy tanks and defeating bosses. Once Kraid and Ridley have both been defeated, the player can shoot their statues to open the path to the final area and confront the Mother Brain.

== Plot ==
In the year 20X5, the Space Pirates attack a Galactic Federation-owned space research vessel and seize samples of Metroid creatures—the predatory lifeforms discovered on the planet SR388. Dangerous floating organisms, the Metroids can latch on to any organism and drain its life energy to kill it. The Space Pirates plan to replicate Metroids by exposing them to beta rays and then using them as biological weapons to destroy all living beings that oppose them. While searching for the stolen Metroids, the Galactic Federation locates the Space Pirates' base of operations on the planet Zebes. The Federation assaults the planet, but the Pirates resist, forcing the Federation to retreat.

As a last resort, the Federation decides to send a lone bounty hunter to penetrate the Pirates' base and destroy Mother Brain, the biomechanical life-form that controls the Space Pirates' fortress and its defenses. Considered the greatest of all bounty hunters, Samus Aran is chosen for the mission. Samus lands her gunship on the surface of Zebes and explores the planet, traveling through the planet's caverns, finding upgrades such as missiles, bombs, energy tanks, the Morph Ball, Screw Attack, and Ice Beam, and uses these weapons to dispatch the alien creatures who get in her way. She comes across Kraid, an ally of the Space Pirates, and Ridley, the Space Pirates' commander, and defeats them both. Eventually, Samus kills the Metroids, and finds and destroys Mother Brain. A timed bomb goes off to destroy the lair and Samus is able to escape before it explodes.

== Development ==
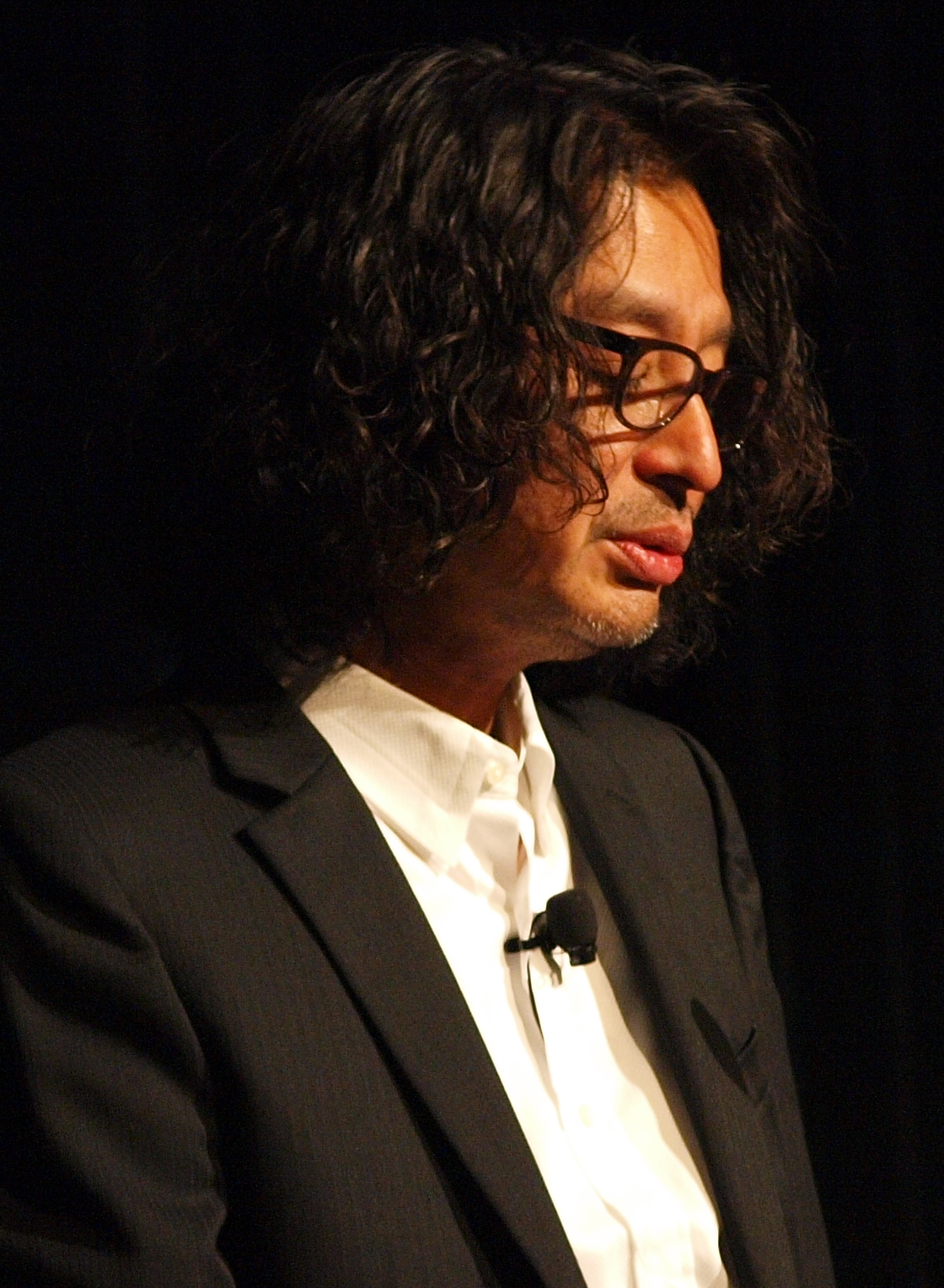
Yoshio Sakamoto, a character designer for Metroid, speaking at the 2010 Game Developers Conference

After Nintendo's release of commercially successful platforming games in the 1980s, including Donkey Kong (1981), Ice Climber (1985), Super Mario Bros. (1985), and the critically acclaimed adventure game The Legend of Zelda (1986), the company began work on an action game. The word "Metroid" is a portmanteau of the words "metro" and "android". It was co-developed by Nintendo's Research and Development 1 division and Intelligent Systems, and produced by Gunpei Yokoi. Metroid was directed by Satoru Okada and Masao Yamamoto (credited as "Yamamoto"), and featured music written by Hirokazu Tanaka (credited as "Hip Tanaka"). The scenario was created by Makoto Kano (credited with his last name), and character design was done by Hiroji Kiyotake (credited with his last name), Hirofumi Matsuoka (credited as "New Matsuoka"), and Yoshio Sakamoto (credited as "Shikamoto"). The character design for Samus Aran was created by Kiyotake.

The production was described as a "very free working environment" by Tanaka, who stated that, though being the composer, he also gave input for the graphics and helped name areas. Partway through development, one of the developers asked the others, "Hey, wouldn't that be kind of cool if it turned out that this person inside the suit was a woman?" This idea was incorporated into the game, though the English and Japanese instruction manuals use masculine pronouns for Samus. Ridley Scott's 1979 horror film Alien was described by Sakamoto as a "huge influence" after the game's world had been created. The development staff was affected by the work of the film's creature designer H. R. Giger, and found his creations to be fitting for the theme. Still, there were problems that threatened timely progress and eventually led Sakamoto to be "forcefully asked to participate" by his superiors, hoping his previous experience could help the team. Sakamoto stated he figured out a way to bypass the limited resources and time to leverage existing game media assets "to create variation and an exciting experience".

Nintendo attempted to distinguish Metroid from other games by making it a nonlinear adventure-based game, in which exploration was a crucial part of the experience. The game often requires that the player retrace steps to progress, forcing the player to scroll the screen in all directions, as with most contemporary games. Metroid is considered one of the first video games to impress a feeling of desperation and solitude on the player. Following The Legend of Zelda, Metroid helped pioneer the idea of acquiring tools to strengthen characters and help progress through the game. Until then, most ability-enhancing power-ups like the Power Shot in Gauntlet (1985) and the Starman in Super Mario Bros. offered only temporary boosts to characters, and they were not required to complete the game. In Metroid, however, items are permanent fixtures that last until the end. In particular, missiles and the ice beam are required to finish the game.

After defeating Mother Brain, the game presents one of five ending screens based on the time to completion. Metroid is one of the first games to contain multiple endings. In the third, fourth, and fifth endings, Samus Aran appears without her suit, and for the first time, reveals herself to be a woman. In Japan, the Disk Card media used by the Famicom Disk System allows players up to three different saved game slots in Metroid, similar to The Legend of Zelda in the West. Use of an internal battery to manage files was not fully realized in time for Metroid's international release. The Western versions of Metroid use a password system that was new to the industry at the time, in which players write down a 24-letter code and re-enter it into the game when they wish to continue a previous session. The password system also allows for the use of the cheat code "NARPAS SWORD", which grants the player infinite health and ammo.

=== Music ===
Tanaka said he wanted to make a score that made players feel like they were encountering a "living organism" and had no distinction between music and sound effects. The only time a melodic theme is heard is when Mother Brain is defeated in order to give the victorious player catharsis. During the rest of the game, the melodies are more minimalistic, because Tanaka wanted the soundtrack to be the opposite of the "hummable" pop tunes found in other games at that time.

== Release ==
Officially defined as a scrolling shooter game, Metroid was released by Nintendo for the Famicom Disk System in Japan on August 6, 1986. An arcade version of the game was released in July 1987 for Nintendo's PlayChoice-10 system. It was released on the Nintendo Entertainment System in North America in August 1987, and in Europe on January 1988.

=== Emulation ===
The game was re-released several times via emulation. Linking the Game Boy Advance game Metroid Fusion (2002) with the GameCube's Metroid Prime (2002) using a link cable unlocks the full version of Metroid on the GameCube. The game is unlocked as a bonus upon completion of Metroid: Zero Mission (2004). A stand-alone version of Metroid for the Game Boy Advance, part of the Classic NES Series collection, was released in Japan on August 10, 2004, in North America on October 25, and in Europe on January 7, 2005. The game arrived on the Wii's Virtual Console in Europe on July 20, 2007, and North America on August 13, 2007, and in Japan on March 4, 2008. Metroid was one of the ten NES games released as part of the Nintendo 3DS Ambassador Program for people who purchased the Nintendo 3DS prior to its first price drop. It was released in North America on August 31 and in Europe on September 1, 2011. Metroid was released for all 3DS owners on March 1, 2012. It was also one of the 30 games included on the NES Classic Edition, released in 2016.

At E3 2010, Nintendo featured Metroid among NES and SNES games in a tech demo called Classic Games, to be released for the Nintendo 3DS. Nintendo of America president Reggie Fils-Aimé said "not to think of them as remakes". Shigeru Miyamoto said that these classics might be using "new features in the games that would take advantage of the 3DS's capabilities".

=== Remake ===
In 2004, a remake, Metroid: Zero Mission, was released for the Game Boy Advance. It features an extended storyline, improved visuals, various new abilities, and revised level design.

== Reception ==
Metroid was a commercial success, reported to be "famous" and "very popular" by 1989. As of 2004, 2.73 million units of Metroid have been sold worldwide.

=== Critics ===
Reception

Aggregate score
Aggregator	Score		
Aggregator	GBA	NES	Wii
GameRankings	62%	63% (retrospective)	N/A

Review scores
Publication	Score		
Publication	GBA	NES	Wii
AllGame	N/A	5/5	N/A
Computer and Video Games	N/A	80%	N/A
Famitsu	N/A	5/5	N/A
GameSpot	N/A	N/A	5.5/10
IGN	N/A	N/A	8/10
Nintendo Life	N/A	N/A	6/10
Beep	N/A	3/5	N/A
Famicom Hisshoubon	N/A	4/5, 4/5, 4/5 (Note: Each of the three reviewers in Famicom Hisshoubon ranked the game on a 5 point scale)	N/A

A reviewer in the Japanese video game magazine Beep said they found themselves absorbed into the game, while finding it took time to use the game's controls and found the only negative to be the long loading time on the Famicom Disk System. All three reviewers in Famicom Hisshoubon complimented the gameplay, with one reviewer writing it did not have the disjointed feeling that similar personal computer games had and another saying the game grew better as Samus becomes stronger in the game. The third reviewer initially thought it would be similar to the game Mighty Bomb Jack, but was surprised at its originality. Two reviewers complimented the background music and graphics, with one saying that if Super Mario Bros. felt like being in a manga comic, Metroid made the player feel like they were in a special effects film.

Catherine Cella of Pennywhistle Press described Metroid as fun, noting its graphics as detailed and colorful, but calling the password-based save system tedious. Computer and Video Games said it was a "tough" platform arcade adventure with a "very handy" password system and recommended it to "avid" arcade adventurers. Game Players praised its "fast-paced" gameplay. Computer Entertainer praised the graphics as "outstanding" and the gameplay as being "full of surprises around every corner". Both Computer and Video Games and Computer Entertainer complimented the ability to restart the game where they had last left off through Nintendo's new password system.

In 2006, Nintendo Power ranked Metroid as the 11th-best game on its list of the Top 200 Games on a Nintendo video game console. Two years later, the magazine named Metroid the fifth-best game for the Nintendo Entertainment System in its Best of the Best feature, describing it as a combination of Super Mario Bros.'s platforming and The Legend of Zelda's exploration and character upgrades. The game was ranked 44th on Electronic Gaming Monthly's original 100 best games of all time in 1997, dropped to 69th in 2001, but was ranked 11th on its "Greatest 200 Videogames of Their Time" in 2006, which ranks games on their impact at the time (whereas EGM's earlier lists rank games based on lasting appeal, with no consideration given to innovation or influence). Game Informer ranked it 6th best game of all time in 2001 and 7th in 2009, saying that it "started the concept of open exploration in games". In 2004, Metroid was inducted into GameSpot's list of the greatest games of all time. GamesRadar ranked it the fifth best NES game ever made. The staff said that it had aged after the release of Super Metroid but was "fantastic for its time". Metroid's ranking of multiple endings entices players to race the game, or speedrunning. Entertainment Weekly called it the #18 greatest game available in 1991, noting its gameplay as a high mark, despite calling its visuals "simplistic".

In a retrospective focusing on the entire Metroid series, GameTrailers remarked on the original game's legacy and its effect on the video game industry. They noted that Metroid launched the series with its ever-popular search and discovery gameplay. The website said that the combination of detailed sprites, original map designs, and an intimidating musical score "generated an unparalleled ambience and atmosphere that trapped the viewer in an almost claustrophobic state". They noted that the Morph Ball, first introduced in Metroid, "slammed an undeniable stamp of coolness on the whole experience and the franchise", and they enjoyed the end segment after defeating Mother Brain, describing the race to escape the planet Zebes as a "twist few saw coming". They said the game brought "explosive action" to the NES and a newfound respect for female protagonists. Noting that Metroid is not the first game to offer an open world, or the first side-view platformer exploration game, or the first game to allow players to reach new areas using newly acquired items, Gamasutra praised Metroid for being perhaps the first video game to "take these different elements and rigorously mold them into a game-ruling structure".

Reviewing the original NES game, AllGame awarded Metroid with the highest rating of five stars. The review praised the game above Metroid II: Return of Samus and Super Metroid, stating that "Metroid's not just a classic because of its astounding graphics, cinematic sound effects, accurate control, and fresh gameplay, but also because of its staying power". Reviewing the Classic NES Series version of the game, GameSpot noted that eighteen years after its initial release, Metroid "just doesn't measure up to today's action adventure standards", giving the game a rating of 5.2 out of 10, for "mediocre". For the Wii Virtual Console version, IGN commented that the game's presentation, graphics, and sound were basic, but they were still pleased with Metroid's "impressive" gameplay, rating the game 8.0 out of 10, for "great", and giving it an Editor's Choice award. The review stated that the game was "still impressive in scope" and that the price was "a deal for this adventure" while criticizing the number of times it has been re-released and noting that it takes "patience" to get past the high initial difficulty curve. In GameSpot's review of the Virtual Console version, they criticized its "frustrating room layouts" and "constantly flickering graphics". In particular, the website was disappointed that Nintendo did not make any changes to the game, specifically criticizing the lack of a save feature.

Metroid's gameplay, focusing on exploration and searching for power-ups to reach new areas, influenced other series, mostly the Castlevania series. The revelation of Samus being a woman was lauded as innovative, and GameTrailers remarked that this "blew the norm of women in pieces, at a time when female video game characters were forced into the role of dutiful queen or kidnapped princess, missile-blasting the way for other characters like Chun-Li [from the Street Fighter series] and Lara Croft [from the Tomb Raider series]".

=== Music ===
In his book Maestro Mario: How Nintendo Transformed Videogame Music into an Art, videogame scholar Andrew Schartmann notes the possible influence of Jerry Goldsmith's Alien score on Tanaka's music—a hypothesis supported by Sakamoto's acknowledgement of Alien's influence on the game's development. He also noted that the game emphasises on the silence to create a claustrophobic atmosphere. Schartmann further argues that Tanaka's emphasis on silence was revolutionary to videogame composition:

Tanaka's greatest contribution to game music comes, paradoxically, in the form of silence. He was arguably the first videogame composer to emphasize the absence of sound in his music. Tanaka's score is an embodiment of isolation and atmospheric effect—one that penetrates deeply into the emotions.

— Andrew Schartmann, Maestro Mario: How Nintendo Transformed Videogame Music into an Art, Thought Catalog (2013)

This view is echoed by GameSpot's History of Metroid, which notes how the "[game's music] superbly evoked the proper feelings of solitude and loneliness one would expect while infiltrating a hostile alien planet alone".
