= Nintendo Manufacturing Division =

Nintendo Manufacturing Division is a division within Nintendo.

The division was divided, among others, into the following departments:

- Nintendo Research & Development No. 1 Department
- Nintendo Research & Development No. 2 Department
- Nintendo Research & Development No. 3 Department
- Nintendo Creative Department
- Nintendo Research & Engineering Department
