= Satoru Okada =

Former general manager of Nintendo Research & Engineering

- 岡田 智
- Born: January 10, 1947 (age 79); Akita, Japan
- Education: Kansai University
- Occupations: Engineer, manager
- Employer: Nintendo (1969–2012)
- Notable work: Duck Hunt, Metroid, Kid Icarus, Famicom Wars, Super Mario Land, Balloon Fight

Satoru Okada (岡田 智 Okada Satoru, born January 10, 1947) is a Japanese retired engineer who served as the general manager of Nintendo Research & Engineering, the division designing and developing Nintendo handheld game consoles. He is best known for creating the original Game Boy and its successors. He was also assistant producer and director of and contributor to several Nintendo games, notably Metroid, released for the Nintendo Entertainment System in 1986.

Okada joined Nintendo in 1969 and went on to work as an engineer at Nintendo Research & Development 1 with Gunpei Yokoi, who developed the hugely successful Game & Watch and Game Boy handheld game consoles. In 1996, Yokoi left Nintendo which caused R&D1 to split, its engineers creating a portable hardware division of which Okada became the general manager. His team lacked Yokoi but nevertheless developed hugely successful handheld consoles: the Game Boy Color, Game Boy Advance, Game Boy Advance SP and Nintendo DS. Okada initially opposed the Nintendo DS' dual-screen design but was overruled by Hiroshi Yamauchi.

Okada also participated in the development of several Nintendo games, as the chief director of Metroid, director of Kid Icarus, Solar Striker (along with Keisuke Terasaki) and Super Mario Land and contributed to many other titles.

Okada retired from Nintendo in January 2012.
