= Solar Striker =

1990 video game

- North American box art
- Developers: Nintendo R&D1; Minakuchi Engineering
- Publisher: Nintendo
- Directors: Satoru Okada; Keisuke Terasaki
- Producer: Gunpei Yokoi
- Designers: K. Hayashi; A. Higashiya; K. Katsuyama; K. Yamagami
- Programmer: K. Sugimoto
- Composer: Toru Osada
- Platform: Game Boy
- Release: JP: January 26, 1990; NA: February 2, 1990; EU: September 28, 1990
- Genre: Scrolling shooter
- Mode: Single-player

Solar Striker (Note: Japanese: ソーラーストライカー) is a vertically scrolling shooter video game developed by Nintendo and Minakuchi Engineering and published by Nintendo for the Game Boy. It was first published in Japan in January 1990, then released later in North America in February 1990 and in Europe in September 1990.

== Plot ==
In the year 2159, the Earth is at war with the planet Reticulon (Great Dark Star Torino in the Japanese version). The Earth Federation Army creates the advanced fighter Solar Striker on a secret base on the Moon. Solar Striker's mission is to fly to Reticulon and destroy the core.

== Gameplay ==
The Solar Striker shooting the first boss

The player controls the advanced space fighter, code-named Solar Striker. There are six levels of play against enemies known as the forces of Reticulon. These enemies appear from the top of the screen. The player can amass power-ups by shooting special ships. One power-up doubles the player's firepower, three power-ups triples the player's firepower, and five power-ups causes shots to explode on impact with enemies, greatly aiding combat against tough enemies and bosses that take many hits to destroy. There are a variety of enemies as well as sub-bosses in later levels. When the player completes all six levels for the first time and after the credits roll, the player will be able to play Hard Mode by pressing Select instead of Start from the title screen.

== Development ==
Solar Striker was designed by Gunpei Yokoi and Keisuke Terasaki, and developed by Nintendo in co-operation with the external company Minakuchi Engineering. It was first published in Japan on January 26, 1990, then released later in North America in February, and in Europe on September 28. As such, it is one of the few scrolling shooters developed by Nintendo.

== Reception ==
Reception

Review scores
Publication	Score
AllGame	2.5/5
Famitsu	4/10, 6/10, 7/10, 6/10
Mean Machines	69%

Reviewing the game in Famicom Tsūshin, Two of the reviewers found the game relatively generic shooter with one these reviewers saying that this kind of game does not work very well on the Game Boy's small screen. Two other reviewers said while it was a generic shooter, it was relatiely easy which felt refreshing in a sea of much more difficult shooter games.

Mean Machines described Solar Striker as "adequate", but noted there was a lack of material to keep players interested, giving the game a score of 69%. Jonathan Sutyak of Allgame describing it as a "decent shooter but nothing great", and citing its difficulty as a deterrent to enjoying it. Games Are Fun gave it a 7 out of 10. German magazine Power Play praised the title for its variety in terms of enemies and levels, though noted the underlying simplicity of the game as well, giving it a score of 70%.

Author Jeff Rovin in the book How to Win at Game Boy Games described the title as "one of the oldest kinds of Nintendo games", comparing it to SNK's Alpha Mission but added there were too few instances of innovation or surprises, and the powerups were "unsatisfying".
