= CL1358+62 =

Galaxy cluster in the constellation Draco

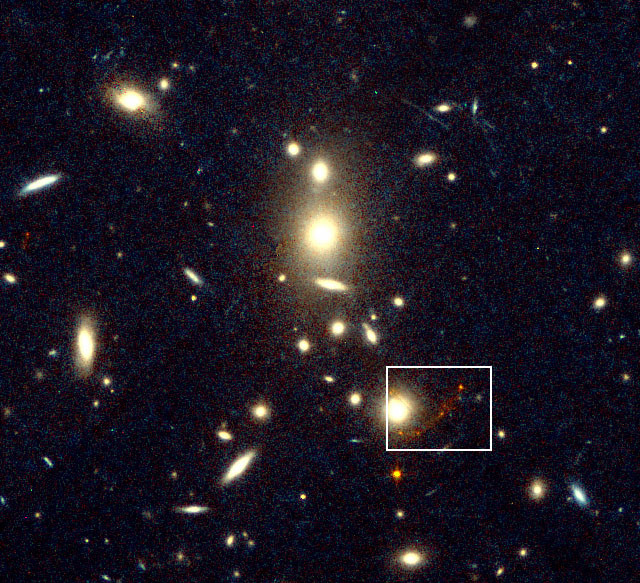
- Hubble Space Telescope image of CL1358+62; CL1358+62G1 is shown in the white rectangle.

Observation data (Epoch J2000)
- Constellation(s): Draco
- Right ascension: 13^{h} 59^{m} 54.3^{s}
- Declination: +62° 30′ 36″
- Brightest member: SDSS J135950.57+623105.1
- Redshift: 0.329

Other designations
- ClG 1358+62, 1E 1358.1+6245, 2E 3157, MCS J1359.8+6231, RXC J1359.8+6231, 1RXS J135949.1+623114, ZwCl 6429

CL 1358+62 (ClG 1358+62) is a galaxy cluster located at z=0.33 redshift. Behind the cluster (which itself lies at a distance of about 3.9 billion light years), lensed into a red arc is an infant galaxy (CL 1358+62 G1) that was the farthest object in the observable universe for a few months. It had a record redshift of z=4.92 and was discovered on July 31, 1997 by M. Franx and G. Illingsworth. It is located approximately 26 billion light years from Earth. Its redshift was measured by the Keck Telescope shortly after its discovery. Along with G1, another galaxy also lensed, was found to be at z=4.92 (CL 1348+62 G2). The pair of galaxies were the first things other than quasars to have the title of most distant object found, since the 1960s. The pair of galaxies remained the most distant objects known until the discovery of RD1 at z=5.34, the first object to exceed redshift 5.

== See also ==
- Physical cosmology
