= Nintendo Research & Development 1 =

Japanese video game developer

Nintendo Research & Development No. 1 Department
- Nintendo logo, used during R&D1's existence

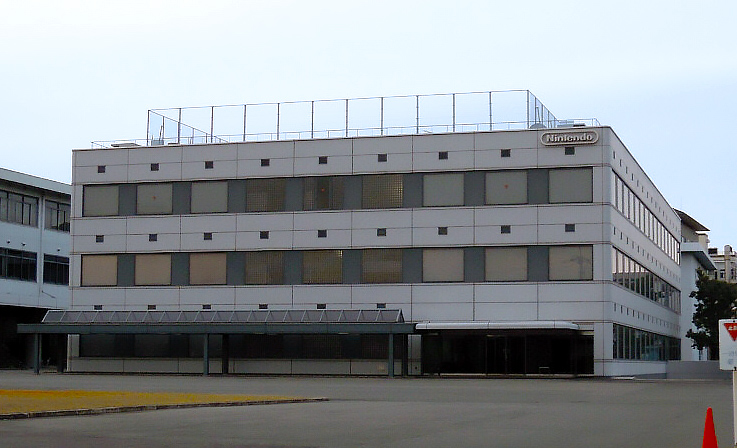
- Exterior of the former Nintendo headquarters in Kyoto, Japan, which housed the department
- Native name: 任天堂開発第一部
- Romanized name: Nintendō Kaihatsu Daiichi Bu
- Formerly: Nintendo Research & Development
- Type: Department
- Industry: Video games
- Genre: Electronic game development; Handheld game console development; Video game development; Video game console development
- Founded: 1970; 56 years ago
- Founder: Hiroshi Yamauchi
- Defunct: 2004; 22 years ago
- Fate: 1996: Spun-off to Nintendo Research & Engineering; 2004: Merged with Nintendo R&D2
- Successor: Nintendo Software Planning & Development
- Headquarters: Kyoto, Japan
- Key people: Gunpei Yokoi (former general manager); Takehiro Izushi (general manager); Yoshio Sakamoto (director); Hirofumi Matsuoka
- Number of employees: 100+
- Parent: Nintendo Manufacturing Division

Nintendo Research & Development No. 1 Department (Note: Japanese: 任天堂開発第一部, Hepburn: Nintendō Kaihatsu Daiichi Bu) (commonly abbreviated as Nintendo R&D1 and formerly known as Nintendo Research & Development Department (Note: Japanese: 任天堂開発部, Hepburn: Nintendō Kaihatsu Bu) before splitting in 1978) was a division of Nintendo, and is its oldest development team. Its creation coincided with Nintendo's entry into the video game industry, and the original R&D1 was headed by Gunpei Yokoi. The developer has created several notable Nintendo series such as Donkey Kong, Mario, and Metroid.

R&D1 developed the hugely successful Game Boy line, which was released in 1989. They developed some of the line's most popular games, such as Super Mario Land, and created the character of Wario.

Team Shikamaru was a small club within Nintendo R&D1 that was composed of Makoto Kano, Yoshio Sakamoto, and Toru Osawa. The group was responsible for designing characters and coming up with scripts for several games including Metroid, Kid Icarus, Famicom Detective Club, Trade & Battle: Card Hero, and several others.

After Yokoi's resignation in 1996, this group was led by Takehiro Izushi. In 2004, Satoru Iwata restructured the Nintendo R&D1 team. Many of the staff members were later reassigned to the Nintendo SPD team, which in turn merged with Nintendo EAD in 2015 to form Nintendo Entertainment Planning & Development.

== History ==
=== Background ===
In 1965, Nintendo, still primarily a hanafuda card manufacturer, hired Gunpei Yokoi, a newly graduated electronics engineer. Yokoi was assigned to the manufacturing division to work on the assembly line machines used to manufacture its cards. In the following year, Hiroshi Yamauchi, president of Nintendo at the time, during a visit to the factory Yokoi was working at, took notice of a toy, an extending arm, that Yokoi had made for his own amusement during his spare time. As Yamauchi was looking to diversify the company's business far beyond its primary card business, Yokoi was ordered to develop the toy into a proper mass-market product for the 1966 holiday rush. The toy was launched as Ultra Hand, and became a huge success, selling over 1.2 million units during its lifetime. Following that, Yokoi was assigned to work on other toys, namely the Ten Billion Barrel puzzle, a miniature remote-controlled vacuum cleaner called the Chiritori, a baseball throwing machine called the Ultra Machine, and a "Love Tester", a novelty device designed to show how much two people loved each other.

=== 1970s-1978: Creation and first electronic games ===
Sometime before 1972, Nintendo created its first electronics development team, the Research & Development department from Nintendo's manufacturing division, assigning Gunpei Yokoi as its general manager. By 1972 the department had approximately 20 developers. In 1978, the manufacturing division split its single research & development department into two, renaming it to Research & Development No. 1 (R&D1) and creating the Nintendo Research & Development No. 2 (R&D2) department. After the split, Yokoi remained general manager of R&D1.

=== 1979-1988: Game & Watch ===
In the late 1970s, Yokoi saw a bored Japanese salaryman playing with a calculator on the Shinkansen high-speed train. This was the inspiration for the creation of the Game & Watch series, a line of handheld electronic games, with each system featuring a single game to be played on an LCD screen in addition to a clock, an alarm, or both. Regardless, it was confirmed that Yokoi was inspired by calculators to develop the line, even using calculator integrated circuits in the systems and button cells to power them. Although Nintendo competitors Mattel and Tomy had already produced portable games, they were mostly bulky systems with low-resolution LED displays and uninspiring gameplay. Yokoi exploited the cheapness of LCDs, producing cheap and light systems, starting in 1980. He would later call this principle Lateral Thinking of Withered Technology: using seasoned technology in radical ways; a principle that echoed throughout Nintendo until the present day.

In 1980, Game & Watch: Ball was the first release of the Game & Watch Silver series, called after its metallic face-plate. Sales weren't reportedly "astonishing", but they were enough to persuade Nintendo to continue developing new titles. The series saw a total of 5 systems, all released during that year. In 1981, Game & Watch: Manhole debuted the Gold series, which was fundamentally the same system with a golden face-plate. It saw only 3 titles which were also released during the same year. In mid-1981, Game & Watch: Parachute was released, debuting the Wide Screen series, sporting a 30% larger display. The series saw a total of 10 titles released until early 1982.

The limitations of the LCD prompted Yokoi and his team to introduce the Multi Screen series with the release of Game & Watch: Oil Panic in mid 1982, adding another screen to potentially double the amount of gameplay each title could offer. The next title of the series was Game & Watch: Donkey Kong, a port of the hugely successful Donkey Kong arcade game. Unable to use a joystick like the original game, as it would reduce the system's portability, Yokoi began researching for solutions. Early Game & Watch systems had a button for each action such as moving left and right or jumping. However, for the new system the team introduced the "cross" directional pad (D-pad): a flat, four-way directional control with one button on each point. The design was patented and later earned a Technology & Engineering Emmy Award in 2008. From then on, all major video game consoles since have had a D-pad of some shape on their controllers, until the Nintendo Switch in 2017.

=== 1989-1990: Game Boy ===
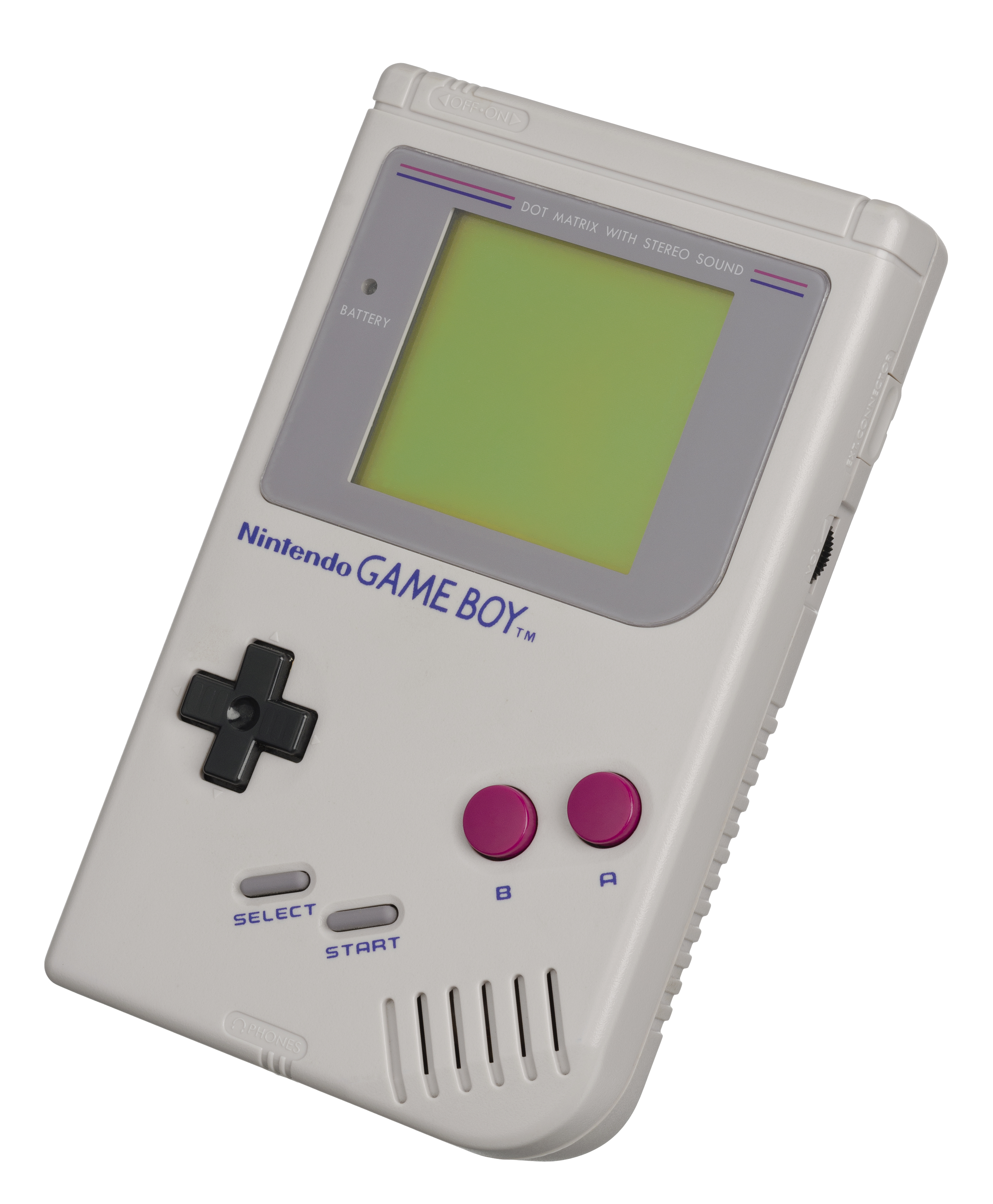
Game Boy, the highly-successful handheld video game console

When the department started working on a successor to the Game & Watch series, Yokoi envisioned a simple and cheap system with interchangeable game cartridges. Development of the system, however, suffered from disagreements in direction, with assistant director Satoru Okada arguing for a more powerful system with third-party development and long-term support from Nintendo, emulating the successful business model that Nintendo R&D2 had achieved with the Nintendo Entertainment System, while Yokoi planned for a much cheaper, less powerful device with a shorter life-span, similar to its predecessor. During an interview, Okada compared the initial project to the Microvision. Eventually, Yokoi agreed to Okada's plan and the project would be known as the Game Boy.

=== 1991-1994: Virtual Boy ===
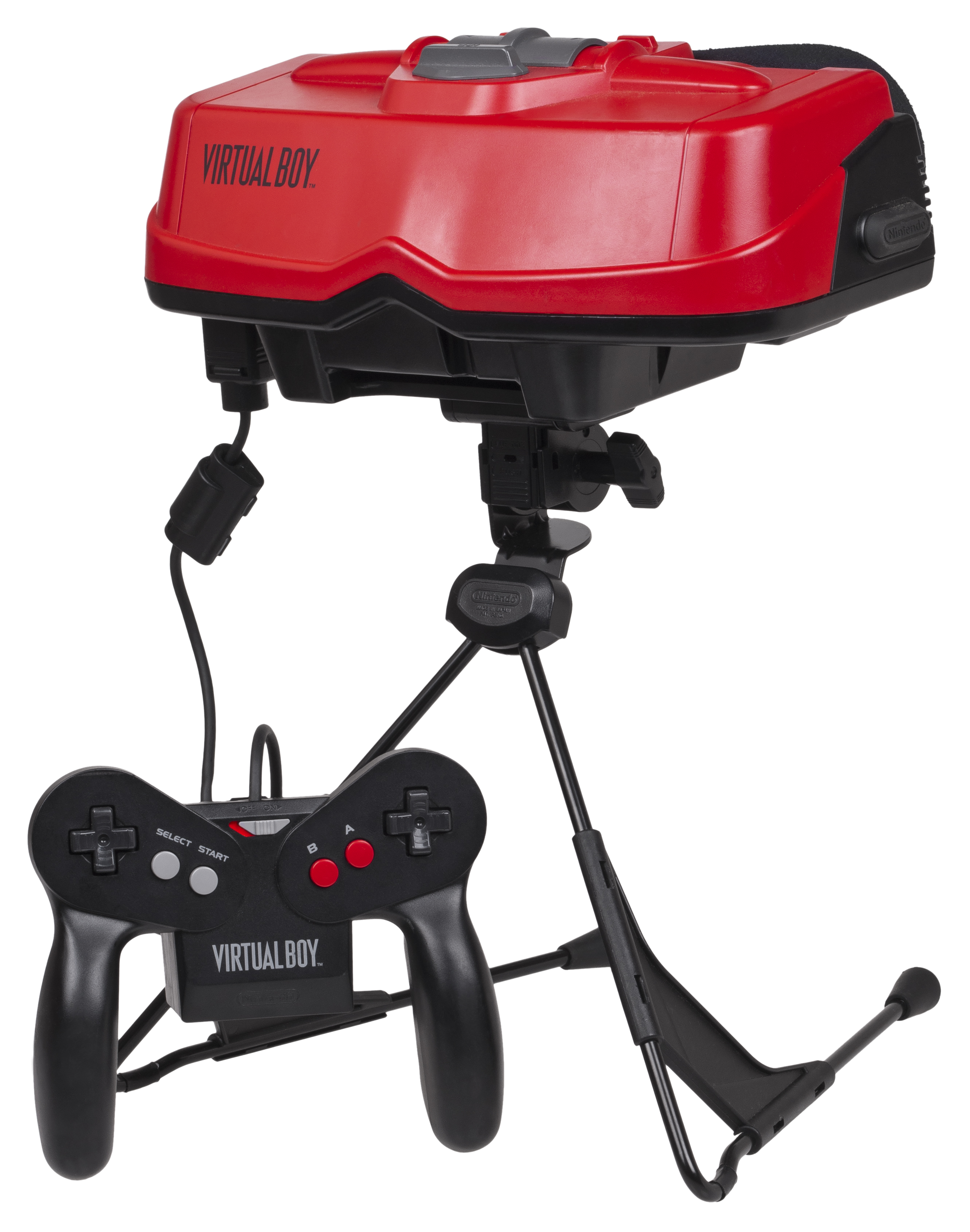
The Virtual Boy, developed by R&D1, emulates 3-D visuals by use of individual red monochrome displays for each eye. It was considered a commercial failure.

In 1991, Nintendo partnered with Massachusetts-based Reflection Technology, Inc. who had developed a 3D stereoscopic head-tracking prototype called the Private Eye. Gunpei Yokoi saw this as a unique technology that competitors would find difficult to emulate. Additionally, the resulting game console was intended to enhance Nintendo's reputation as an innovator and to "encourage more creativity" in games. Code-naming the project "VR32", Nintendo entered into an exclusive agreement with Reflection Technology to license the technology for its displays.

Spending four years in development and eventually building a dedicated manufacturing plant in China, Nintendo worked to turn its VR32 vision into an affordable and health-conscious console design. Yokoi retained RTI's choice of red LED because it was the cheapest, and because unlike a totally backlit LCD, its perfect blackness could achieve a more immersive sense of infinite depth. RTI and Nintendo said a color LCD system would have been prohibitively expensive, retailing for more than US$500. A color LCD system was also said to have caused "jumpy images in tests". With ongoing concerns about motion sickness, the risk of developing lazy eye conditions in young children, and Japan's new Product Liability Act of 1995, Nintendo eliminated the head tracking functionality and converted its headmounted goggle design into a stationary, heavy, precision steel-shielded, tabletop form factor conformant to the recommendation of the Schepens Eye Research Institute.

According to David Sheff's book Game Over, the increasingly reticent Yokoi never actually intended for the increasingly downscaled console to be released in its final form. However, Nintendo pushed the Virtual Boy to market so that it could focus development resources on the Nintendo 64.

=== 1995: Game Boy successor ===
In 1995, the department started developing a successor to the Game Boy, under the code-name Atlantis. Despite its predecessors having a monochrome display, the R&D1 team had already experimented with color displays from as early as 1992. The Atlantis prototype consisted of an handheld with a 32-bit ARM7 CPU, a larger color display, and four face buttons. It was reported that the system was supposed to release in late 1996.

Meanwhile, the department was also working on a revision of the Game Boy. The system would require fewer batteries, providing approximately 10 hours of gameplay, and was also equipped with a DC connector which could be used to power the system. The screen was also changed to a true black-and-white display, rather than the green-tinted monochrome display of the original Game Boy, and had an improved pixel response-time, mostly eliminating the ghosting effect. It finally released as the Game Boy Pocket on July 21, 1996, in Japan, on September 3 in North America, and in Europe during the following year. Although it had no power LED initially, it was soon added to later editions due public demand.

Following the commercial success of the Game Boy Pocket, the Atlantis system was delayed by a year to late 1997. Nonetheless, the system was eventually cancelled due to concerns of it being too big, having a drastically decreased battery life (to approximately 1 hour, as LCD color displays required a back-light at the time), and being too expensive to manufacture. Although it was shelved, the project would later considerably speed up the development of the Game Boy Color in 1997 by the Nintendo Research & Engineering department.

=== 1996-2003: Gunpei Yokoi's departure and hardware team spin-off ===
On August 15, 1996, long-time department general manager, Gunpei Yokoi, left Nintendo to form his own company, Koto Laboratory. Despite speculation that he had left Nintendo due to the commercial failure of the Virtual Boy a year prior, Yokoi clarified that he'd long wished to become independent. Yokoi and his new company eventually worked on the WonderSwan handheld for Bandai before his tragic death in 1997 in a traffic accident. In order to fill Yokoi's vacancy, long-time Nintendo engineer Takehiro Izushi was appointed as the new general manager of the department. Additionally, the department's hardware team was spun-off into a new development department, called Nintendo Research & Engineering and led by Satoru Okada. The software development team, however, remained at R&D1. This new department would be responsible for continuing the Game Boy's legacy becoming the source of every major Nintendo handheld game console until its closure in 2012.

Following Yokoi's departure, and no longer having a dedicated hardware development team, the department focused instead on developing games for other Nintendo-developed consoles. It was responsible for the re-releases of its Game & Watch classics in the Game & Watch Gallery series for both the Game Boy and Game Boy Color, starting in 1997. It also developed sequels to its Wario Land classic in the form of Wario Land II, released in 1998, and Wario Land 3, in 2000, both for the Game Boy Color, and Wario Land 4 for the Game Boy Advance, released a year later. The department was also responsible for creating the Wario spin-off series with WarioWare, Inc.: Mega Microgames!, released in 2003 for the Game Boy Advance. After an 8-year hiatus, R&D1 introduced a new installment in its Metroid series, Metroid Fusion, released in 2002. In 2004, R&D1's last project was launched, Metroid: Zero Mission a remake of the original game.

=== 2004: Absorbed into Nintendo Software Planning & Development ===
In 2004, the department, along with Nintendo Research & Development 2, was absorbed into the newly created Nintendo Software Planning & Development division. Then-Nintendo president Satoru Iwata created and appointed himself as general manager of the new division to focus on co-producing and supervising second-party development, thus relieving the Entertainment Analysis & Development division (EAD) and its general manager Shigeru Miyamoto to focus on first-party projects. Although that was the division's primary focus, it went on to develop some video games titles internally.

In 2018, former general manager of the R&D1 department Takehiro Izushi retired from Nintendo after 43 years in the company.

== Products developed ==
=== Electronic games ===
List of electronic games developed by the Nintendo Research & Development No. 1 department
Year	Title	Genre(s)	Platform(s)	Series	Ref.
1980	Game & Watch: Ball		Game & Watch	Silver	
1980	Game & Watch: Flagman		Game & Watch	Silver	
1980	Game & Watch: Vermin		Game & Watch	Silver	
1980	Game & Watch: Fire		Game & Watch	Silver	
1980	Game & Watch: Judge		Game & Watch	Silver	
1981	Game & Watch: Manhole		Game & Watch	Gold	
1981	Game & Watch: Helmet		Game & Watch	Gold	
1981	Game & Watch: Lion		Game & Watch	Gold	
1981	Game & Watch: Parachute		Game & Watch	Wide Screen	
1981	Game & Watch: Octopus		Game & Watch	Wide Screen	
1981	Game & Watch: Popeye		Game & Watch	Wide Screen	
1981	Game & Watch: Chef		Game & Watch	Wide Screen	
1981	Game & Watch: Mickey Mouse		Game & Watch	Wide Screen	
1981	Game & Watch: Egg		Game & Watch	Wide Screen	
1981	Game & Watch: Fire		Game & Watch	Wide Screen	
1982	Game & Watch: Turtle Bridge		Game & Watch	Wide Screen	
1982	Game & Watch: Fire Attack		Game & Watch	Wide Screen	
1982	Game & Watch: Snoopy Tennis		Game & Watch	Wide Screen	
1982	Game & Watch: Oil Panic		Game & Watch	Multi Screen	
1982	Game & Watch: Donkey Kong		Game & Watch	Multi Screen	
1982	Game & Watch: Donkey Kong Jr.		Game & Watch	New Wide Screen	
1982	Game & Watch: Mickey & Donald		Game & Watch	Multi Screen	
1982	Game & Watch: Green House		Game & Watch	Multi Screen	
1983	Game & Watch: Donkey Kong II		Game & Watch	Multi Screen	
1983	Game & Watch: Mario Bros.		Game & Watch	Multi Screen	
1983	Game & Watch: Donkey Kong Jr.		Game & Watch	Table Top	
1983	Game & Watch: Mario's Cement Factory		Game & Watch	Table Top	
1983	Game & Watch: Mario's Cement Factory		Game & Watch	New Wide Screen	
1983	Game & Watch: Snoopy		Game & Watch	Table Top	
1983	Game & Watch: Rain Shower		Game & Watch	Multi Screen	
1983	Game & Watch: Popeye		Game & Watch	Table Top	
1983	Game & Watch: Manhole		Game & Watch	New Wide Screen	
1983	Game & Watch: Snoopy		Game & Watch	Panorama	
1983	Game & Watch: Popeye		Game & Watch	Panorama	
1983	Game & Watch: Donkey Kong Jr.		Game & Watch	Panorama	
1983	Game & Watch: Lifeboat		Game & Watch	Multi Screen	
1983	Game & Watch: Mario's Bombs Away		Game & Watch	Panorama	
1983	Game & Watch: Pinball		Game & Watch	Multi Screen	
1984	Game & Watch: Spitball Sparky		Game & Watch	Super Color	
1984	Game & Watch: Crab Grab		Game & Watch	Super Color	
1984	Game & Watch: Mickey Mouse		Game & Watch	Panorama	
1984	Game & Watch: Boxing		Game & Watch	Micro Vs. System	
1984	Game & Watch: Donkey Kong 3		Game & Watch	Micro Vs. System	
1984	Game & Watch: Donkey Kong Circus		Game & Watch	Panorama	
1984	Game & Watch: Donkey Kong Hockey		Game & Watch	Micro Vs. System	
1985	Game & Watch: Black Jack		Game & Watch	Multi Screen	
1985	Game & Watch: Tropical Fish		Game & Watch	New Wide Screen	

=== Video game consoles ===
List of video game consoles developed by the Nintendo Research & Development No. 1 department
Year	Name	Ref.
1989	Game Boy	
1995	Game Boy Play-It-Loud!	
1995	Virtual Boy	
1996	Game Boy Pocket	

=== Video games ===
List of video games developed by the Nintendo Research & Development No. 1 department
Year	Title	Genre(s)	Platform(s)	Ref.
1978	Computer Othello		Arcade	
1979	Head On N		Arcade	
1979	Monkey Magic		Arcade	
1979	Sheriff		Arcade	
1979	Space Launcher		Arcade	
1980	Space Firebird		Arcade	
1980	Heli Fire	Fixed shooter	Arcade	
1981	Donkey Kong	Platform	Arcade	
1981	Sky Skipper		Arcade	
1982	Donkey Kong Jr.	Platform	Arcade	
1982	Popeye	Platform	Arcade	
1983	Mario Bros.	Platform	Arcade, Nintendo Entertainment System	
1983	Donkey Kong 3	Shooter	Arcade	
1983	Baseball	Sports	Nintendo Entertainment System	
1984	Tennis	Sports	Nintendo Entertainment System	
1984	Pinball	Pinball	Nintendo Entertainment System	
1984	Wild Gunman	Shooter	Nintendo Entertainment System	
1984	Duck Hunt	Shooter	Nintendo Entertainment System	
1984	Hogan's Alley	Shooter	Nintendo Entertainment System	
1984	Donkey Kong 3	Shooter	Nintendo Entertainment System	
1984	Devil World	Maze	Nintendo Entertainment System	
1984	Urban Champion	Fighting	Nintendo Entertainment System	
1984	Clu Clu Land	Puzzle	Nintendo Entertainment System	
1985	Balloon Fight	Action	Nintendo Entertainment System	
1985	Ice Climber	Platform	Nintendo Entertainment System	
1985	Wrecking Crew	Action, puzzle	Nintendo Entertainment System	
1985	Stack-Up	Action, puzzle	Nintendo Entertainment System	
1985	Gyromite	Action, puzzle	Nintendo Entertainment System	
1985	Vs. Ice Climber	Platform	Arcade	
1986	Baseball	Sports	Family Computer Disk System	
1986	Gumshoe	Shooter	Nintendo Entertainment System	
1986	Metroid	Action-Adventure	Family Computer Disk System	
1986	Kid Icarus	Action, platform	Family Computer Disk System	
1987	Kid Icarus	Action, platform	Nintendo Entertainment System	
1987	Metroid	Action-Adventure	Nintendo Entertainment System	
1987	Nakayama Miho no Tokimeki High School	Dating sim	Family Computer Disk System	
1988	Famicom Detective Club: The Missing Heir	Adventure	Family Computer Disk System	
1988	Famicom Wars	Strategy	Family Computer	
1989	Baseball	Sports	Game Boy	
1989	Alleyway	Puzzle	Game Boy	
1989	Famicom Detective Club: The Girl Who Stands Behind	Adventure	Family Computer Disk System	
1989	Tetris	Puzzle	Game Boy	
1989	Tetris	Puzzle	Nintendo Entertainment System	
1989	Super Mario Land	Platform	Game Boy	
1990	Fire Emblem: Shadow Dragon and the Blade of Light	Tactical role-playing game	Family Computer	
1990	Dr. Mario	Puzzle	Nintendo Entertainment System, Game Boy	
1990	Solar Striker	Shooter	Game Boy	
1990	Barker Bill's Trick Shooting	Shooter	Nintendo Entertainment System	
1991	Kid Icarus: Of Myths and Monsters	Action, platform	Game Boy	
1991	Metroid II: Return of Samus	Action-Adventure	Game Boy	
1992	Clu Clu Land: Welcome to New Clu Clu Land	Puzzle	Family Computer Disk System	
1992	X (1992 video game)	Space combat simulation	Game Boy	
1992	Mario Paint	Art tool	Super Nintendo Entertainment System	
1992	The Frog For Whom the Bell Tolls	Action role-playing	Game Boy	
1992	Super Mario Land 2: 6 Golden Coins	Platform	Game Boy	
1993	Joy Mech Fight	Fighting	Family Computer	
1994	Wario Land: Super Mario Land 3	Platform	Game Boy	
1994	Wario's Woods	Puzzle	Nintendo Entertainment System, Super Nintendo Entertainment System	
1994	Super Metroid	Action-Adventure	Super Nintendo Entertainment System	
1995	Mario's Tennis	Sports	Virtual Boy	
1995	Teleroboxer	Fighting	Virtual Boy	
1995	Mario Clash	Action	Virtual Boy	
1995	Virtual Boy Wario Land	Platform	Virtual Boy	
1995	Kirby's Block Ball	Action	Game Boy	
1997	Game & Watch Gallery	Minigame compilation	Game Boy	
1997	BS Tantei Club: Yuki ni Kieta Kako	Adventure	Satellaview	
1998	Wario Land II	Platform	Game Boy	
1998	Wario Land II	Platform	Game Boy Color	
2000	Trade & Battle: Card Hero	RPG	Game Boy Color	
2000	Wario Land 3	Platform	Game Boy Color	
2000	Sin and Punishment	Shooter	Nintendo 64	
2001	Wario Land 4	Platform	Game Boy Advance	
2002	Metroid Fusion	Action-Adventure	Game Boy Advance	
2003	WarioWare, Inc.: Mega Microgames!	Minigame compilation	Game Boy Advance	
2003	WarioWare, Inc.: Mega Party Games!	Minigame compilation	GameCube	
2004	Metroid: Zero Mission	Action-Adventure	Game Boy Advance	
