= RD1 =

Galaxy in the constellation Triangulum

RD1 (0140+326 RD1)
- RD1 as viewed by the W. M. Keck Observatory

Observation data (J2000 epoch)
- Constellation: Triangulum
- Right ascension: 01^{h} 43^{m} 42.8^{s}
- Declination: +32° 54′ 00.0″
- Redshift: 5.34
- Distance: around 12.5 billion light-years (light travel distance); ~26 billion light-years (present comoving distance)
- Apparent magnitude (V): 26.1

Other designations
- [DS98] 6C 0140+326 RD1

RD1 or 0140+326 RD1 is a distant galaxy, it once held the title of most distant galaxy known. RD1 was discovered in March 1998, and is at z = 5.34, and was the first object found to exceed redshift 5. It bested the previous recordholders, a pair of galaxies at z=4.92 lensed by the galaxy cluster CL 1358+62 (CL 1358+62 G1 & CL 1358+62 G2). It was the most distant object known to mankind for a few months in 1998, until BR1202-0725 LAE was discovered at z = 5.64.

== Distance measurements ==
The "distance" of a far away galaxy depends on the chosen distance measurement. With a redshift of 5.34, light from this galaxy is estimated to have taken around 12.5 billion years to reach us. But since this galaxy is receding from Earth, the present comoving distance is estimated to be around 26 billion light-years.
