= Nintendo Research & Engineering =

Former hardware development department by Nintendo

Nintendo Research & Engineering Department
- Nintendo's logotype, used until 2016

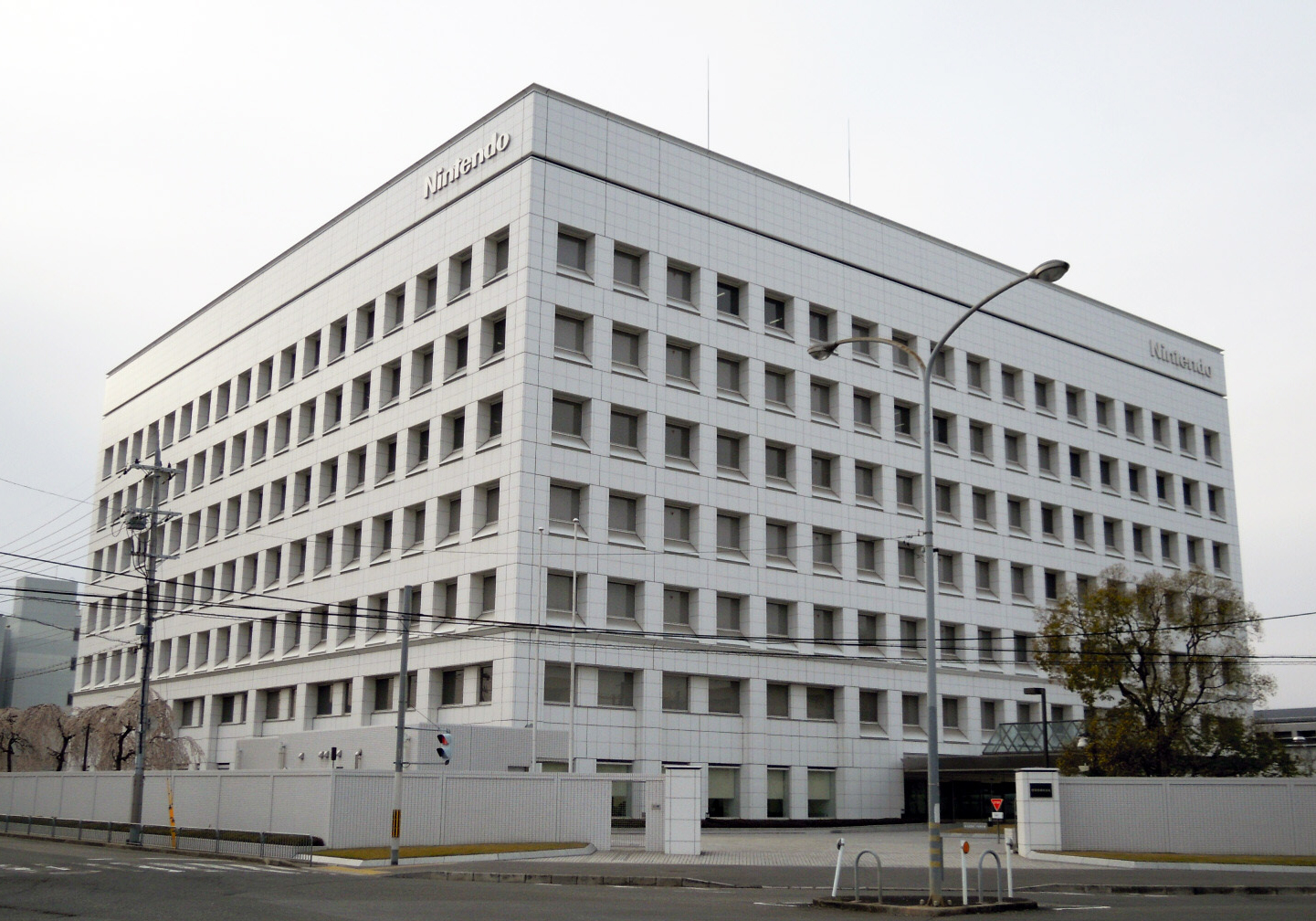
- Exterior of the Nintendo Central Office in Kyoto, where the division was housed for most of its existence
- Native name: 任天堂開発技術部
- Romanized name: Nintendō Kaihatsu Gijutsu Bu
- Company type: Division department
- Industry: Video games
- Genre: Handheld game console development
- Predecessors: Nintendo R&D1
- Founded: 1996; 30 years ago
- Founder: Hiroshi Yamauchi
- Defunct: February 16, 2013
- Fate: Merged with Nintendo Integrated Research & Development
- Successor: Nintendo Integrated Research & Development
- Headquarters: Kyoto, Japan
- Number of locations: 1 (2012)
- Key people: Satoru Okada (General manager)
- Number of employees: 150 (2012)
- Parent: Nintendo Manufacturing Division

Nintendo Research & Engineering Department, (Note: Japanese: 任天堂開発技術部, Hepburn: Nintendō Kaihatsu Gijutsu Bu) commonly abbreviated as Nintendo RED, was a division of Nintendo responsible for the development of handheld game consoles and its associated peripherals. It was founded in 1996 and disbanded in 2012. The department was under Nintendo's manufacturing division, and was led by Satoru Okada. The department was created in 1996 following Nintendo Research & Development 1's (R&D1) general manager and Game & Watch and Game Boy creator, Gunpei Yokoi's departure from Nintendo. Most of the department's team originate from R&D1's hardware engineers.

The department went on to create some of Nintendo's best-selling handheld game consoles such as the Game Boy Color, Game Boy Advance, Nintendo DS and Nintendo 3DS. Following the retirement of Okada in early 2012, the department was merged into the Nintendo Integrated Research & Development division, effectively merging Nintendo's handheld and home game console development teams.

== History ==
=== Background ===
In 1996, following the commercial failure of Nintendo's first virtual reality headset, the Virtual Boy, general manager of the Nintendo Research & Development 1 department (R&D1), Gunpei Yokoi, responsible for the console's development, resigned from Nintendo. This left Nintendo's historic handheld game console and game development department without leadership. As such, then Nintendo president Hiroshi Yamauchi spun-off the hardware development team into a new development department, called Nintendo Research & Engineering, appointing Satoru Okada as general manager. The software development team, however, remained at the R&D1 department. This new department would be responsible for continuing the Game Boy's legacy with the development of successor systems.

=== 1996-2001: Creation and Game Boy Color ===
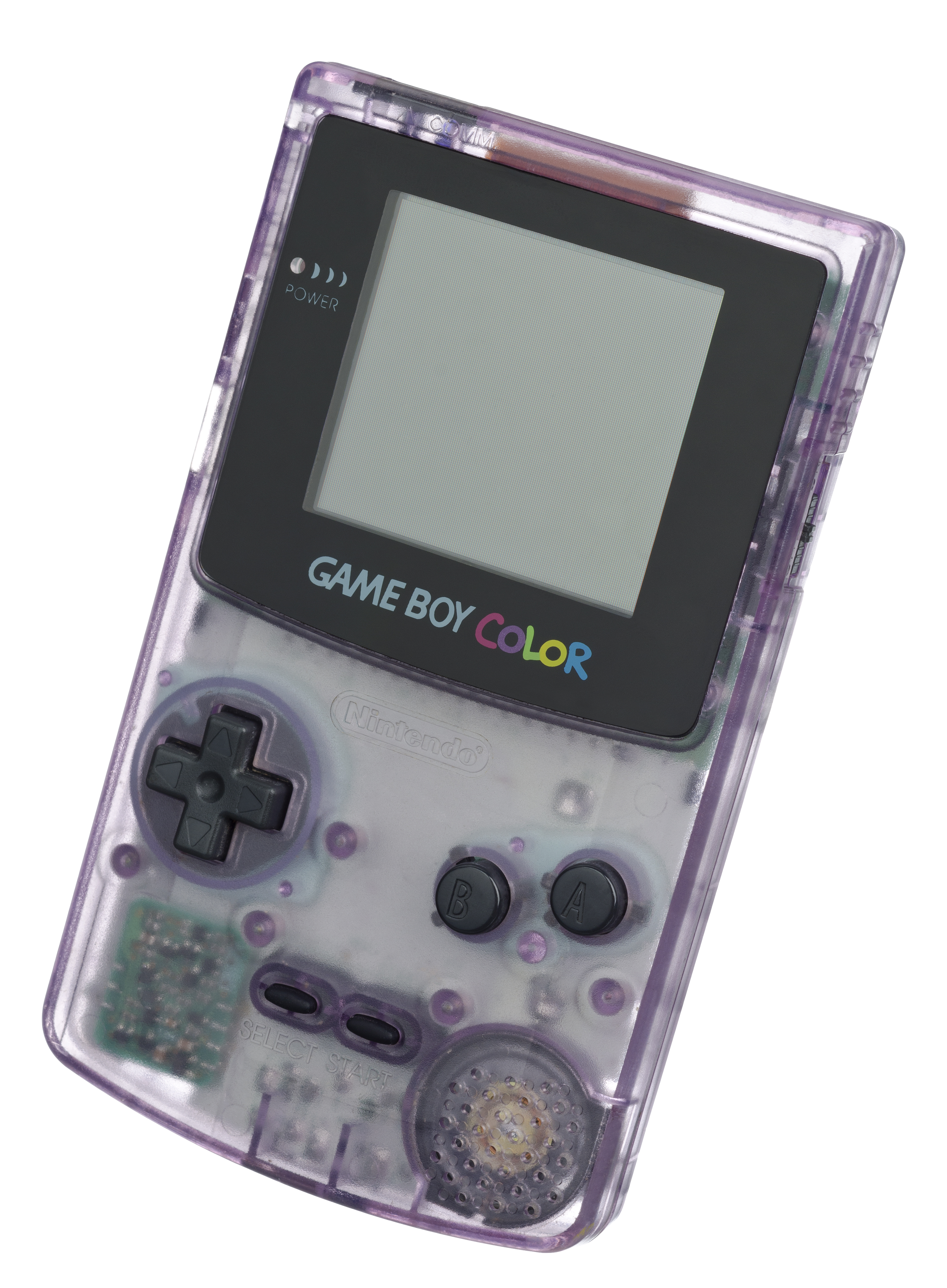
Game Boy Color, released in 1998, was developed by the department.

Despite the Game Boy and its revisions having a monochrome display, Nintendo R&D1, the departments predecessor, had already experimented with color displays from as early as 1992. However, the project was eventually cancelled due to concerns of it being too big, having a drastically decreased battery life (to approximately 1 hour) as LCD color displays required a back-light at the time, and too expensive to manufacture. However, in October 1997, Okada noticed that color displays were now cheaper and didn't require a back-light. And so, after 5 years of failed prototypes, the Game Boy Color was born. As the team used already existing prototypes as a starting point, development only took approximately 10 months, in contrast to the 2–3 years it usually takes to develop a new system. Despite wishing to design a new system from scratch, Okada and Nintendo decided to keep the Game Boy Color compatible with its already existing library of more than 1600 games.

Shortly after Nintendo released the Game Boy Color, the team experimented with touchscreen displays for the first time. Masato Kuwahara lead the project to develop an attachment for the Game Boy Color, which would attach to the system's display and give it touchscreen capabilities. Although Nintendo EAD general manager and video game designer Shigeru Miyamoto liked the concept, it was eventually cancelled as it wasn't well received by the rest of Nintendo's management due to making the system's screen too dark, as it didn't have a back light.

=== 1999-2005: Game Boy Advance ===
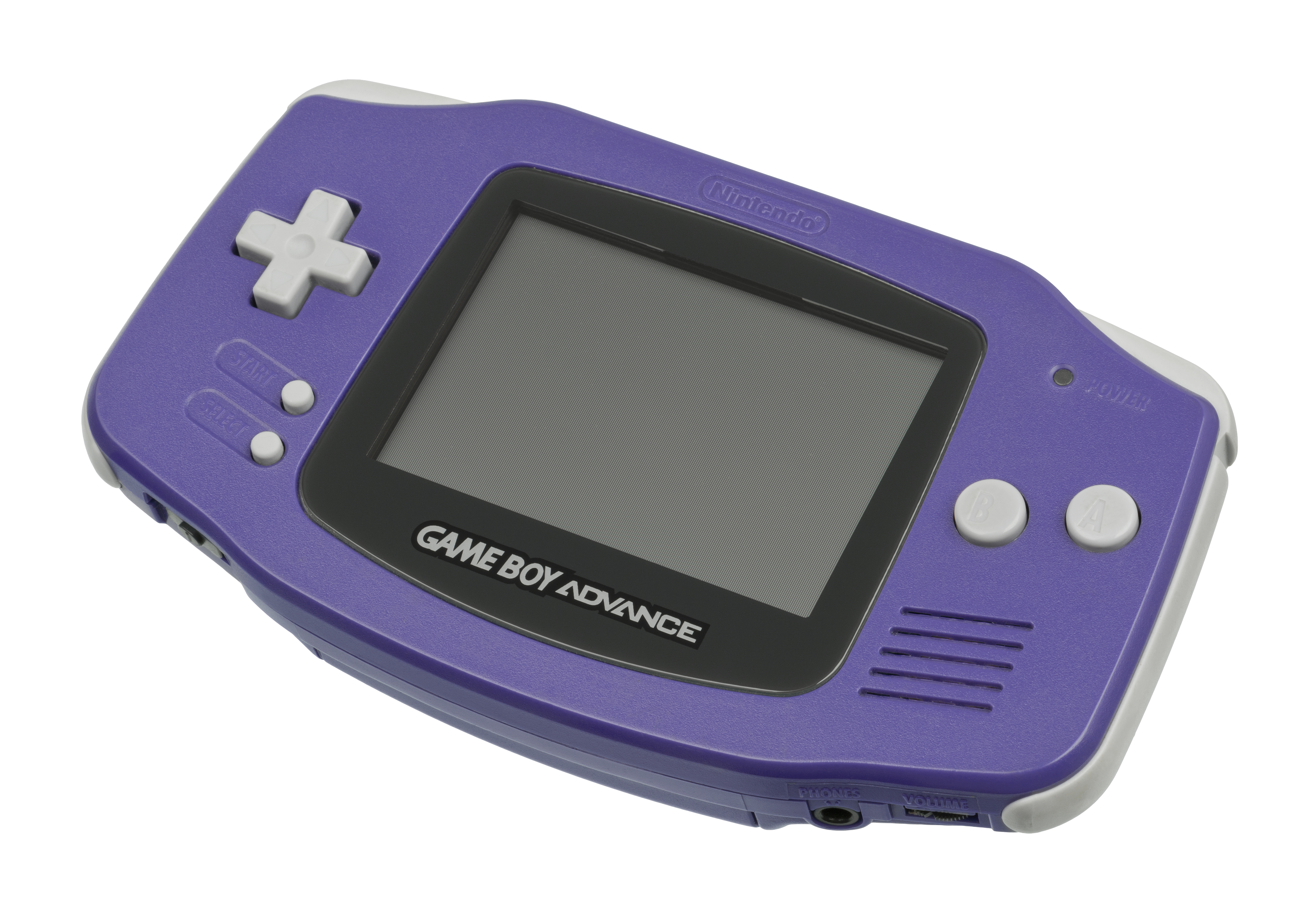
Game Boy Advance

After being approximately two years in development, the department launched the Game Boy Color's successor, the Game Boy Advance, in 2001. The development team's first step in designing the new system was determining its central processing unit (CPU) and display resolution, which would eventually determine the handheld's size. The CPU itself took more than one year to design, mainly due to feature requests from both Nintendo and external developers, which required certain functions be implemented directly in the processing unit. One such request was the addition of shoulder buttons (L and R), originally introduced in the Super Nintendo Entertainment System. Regardless, only one major CPU redesign occurred during the course the handheld's development. As for the display's aspect ratio, in order to facilitate bringing ports to the system's library from home consoles, the team decided on implementing a widescreen, a common feature of televisions at the time. In terms of its external design, the team made a drastic change from the Game Boy Advance's predecessors, opting for an horizontal-oriented system instead. Although the team tested a vertical orientation, it was scrapped as it would make the unit too big. Despite using similar materials as its predecessor, the system is and feels much lighter and smaller due to its more optimized internal layout, such as the position of its batteries in the system's center.

Masato Kuwahara tested a touchscreen attachment the team had developed for the Game Boy Color on the Game Boy Advance SP, however it suffered the same fate as its predecessor.

=== 2005-2010: Nintendo DS family ===
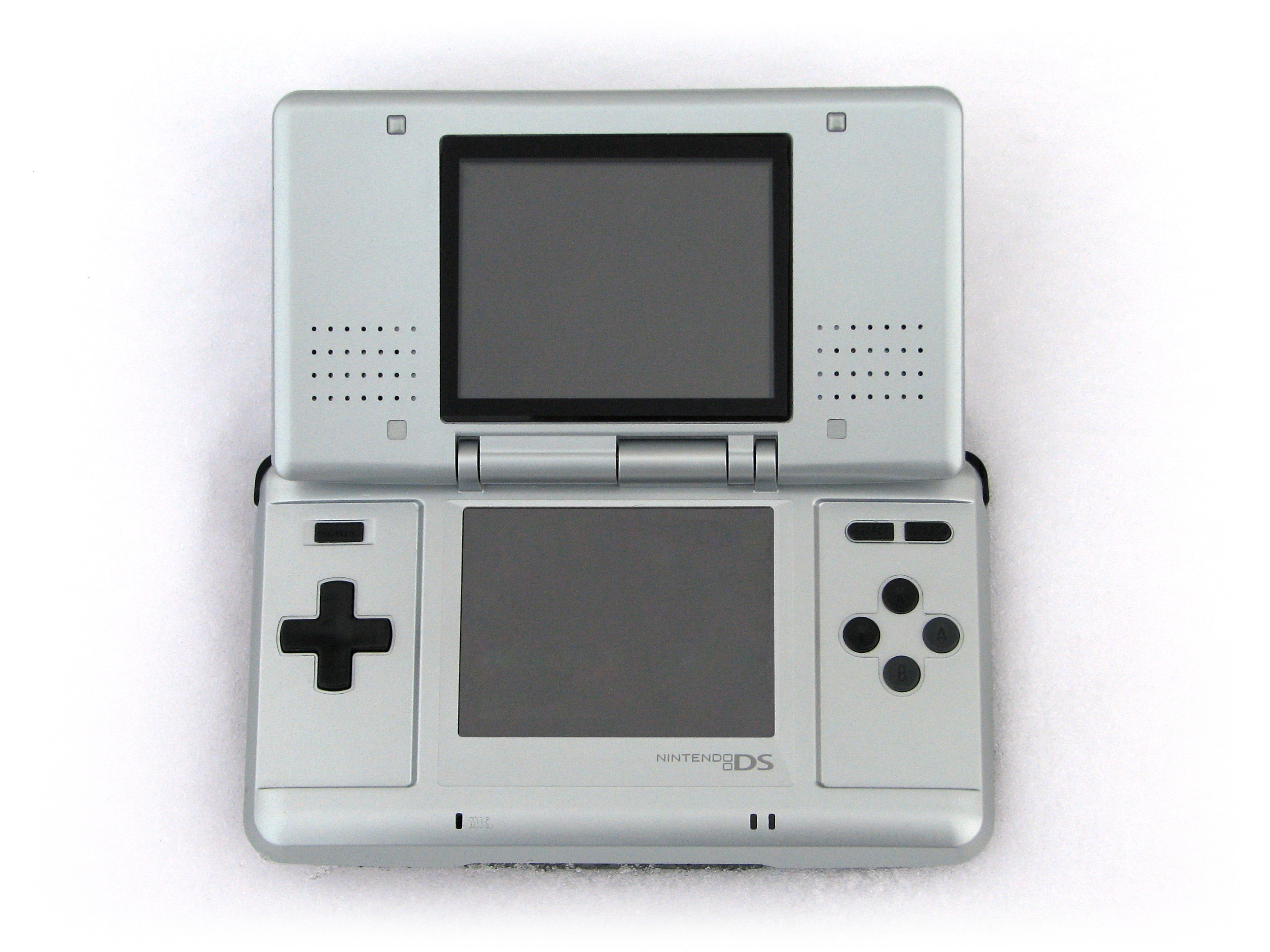
Nintendo DS

Shortly after launching the Game Boy Advance SP, the department started working on a new system in the Game Boy family, code-named Iris. Although the project was progressing with no issues, it was suddenly cancelled. Then-Nintendo president Satoru Iwata was approached by his predecessor, Hiroshi Yamauchi, who requested he implement two screens on Nintendo's next handheld, in the same fashion as the dual-screen Game & Watch. Despite the team and Iwata himself hating the idea, Iwata demanded that the project would go forward. In a 2017 interview, Okada confessed he now believed that pushing for a direct successor for the Game Boy Advance was wrong and was glad Iwata followed with Yamauchi's input.

In late 2006, the department started development on the third system in the Nintendo DS family. The project was directed by Masato Kuwahara and would later be known as the Nintendo DSi. Despite initially struggling to decide on how to innovate with the restriction of making the system a revision of the Nintendo DS instead of a full-blown successor, by February 2007, the system's technical specifications were set.

While developing the Nintendo DSi XL, the department was also working on a successor to the Nintendo DS family, the Nintendo 3DS.

=== 2010-2012: Nintendo 3DS and merge with Nintendo IRD ===
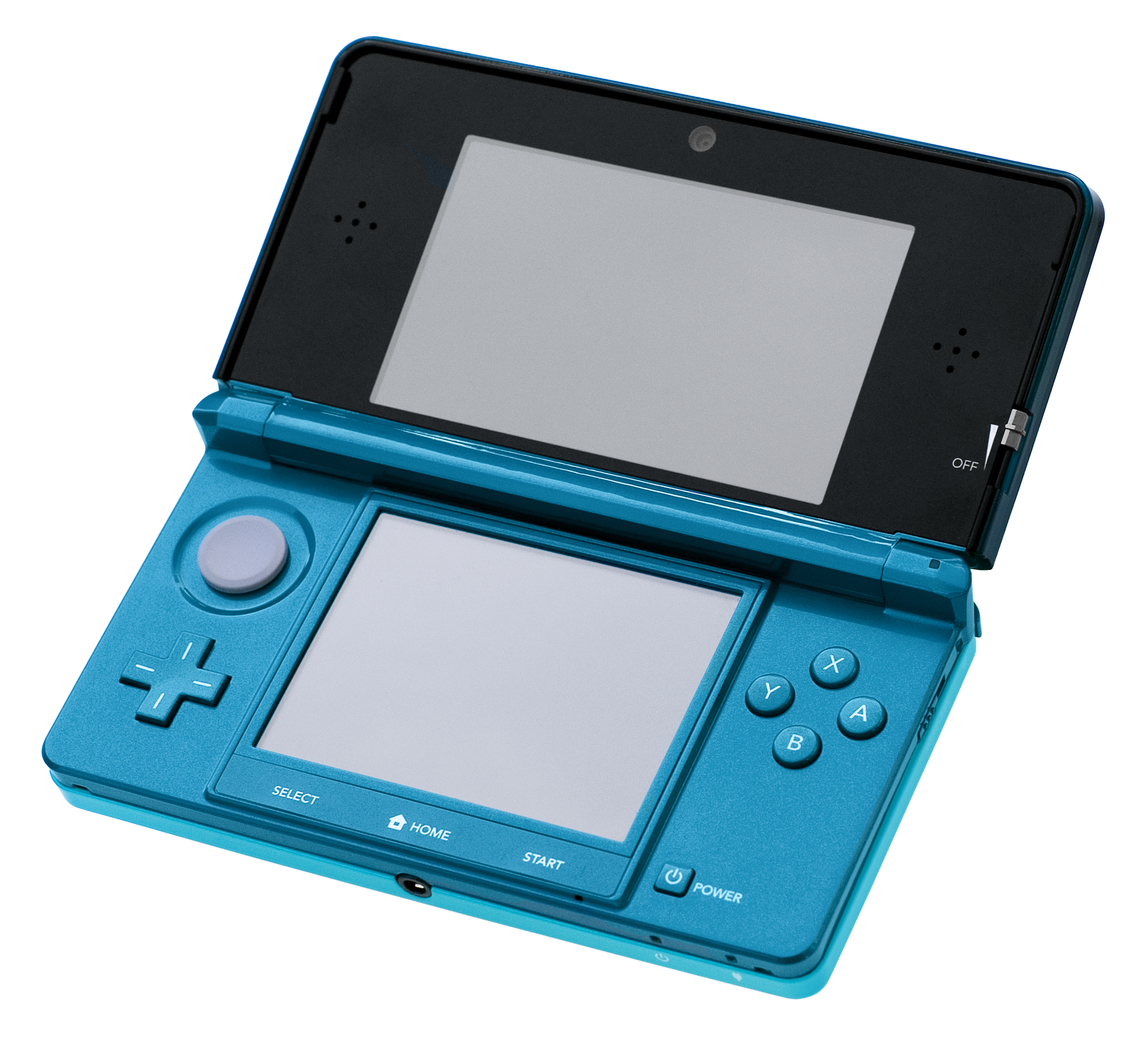
Nintendo 3DS

In January 2012, the department's general manager, Satoru Okada retired. Shortly after, on February 16, the department was merged with the Integrated Research & Development division, effectively combining Nintendo's portable and home video game console development teams. According to then Nintendo president Satoru Iwata the aim of the merge was to develop a common software architecture for Nintendo's future consoles, such as their operating system, in order to facilitate developing games and apps for various consoles, thus eliminating software "droughts".

== Hardware developed ==
List of hardware developed by the Nintendo Research & Engineering department
Year	Title	Platform(s)	Ref.
1998	Game Boy Light	Hardware	
1998	Game Boy Camera & Printer	Game Boy	
1998	Game Boy Color	Hardware	
2001	Game Boy Advance	Hardware	
2002	Nintendo e-Reader	Game Boy Advance	
2003	Game Boy Advance SP	Hardware	
2004	Nintendo DS	Hardware	
2005	Play-Yan	Game Boy Advance, Nintendo DS	
2005	Game Boy Micro	Hardware	
2006	Nintendo DS Lite	Hardware	
2008	Nintendo DSi	Hardware	
2009	Nintendo DSi XL	Hardware	
2011	Battle & Get! Pokémon Typing DS Keyboard	Nintendo DS	
2011	Nintendo 3DS	Hardware	
2011	Circle Pad Pro	Nintendo 3DS	
2012	Circle Pad Pro XL	Nintendo 3DS	
