= Masayuki Uemura =

Japanese engineer, video game producer, and professor (1943–2021)

- 上村雅之
- Born: 20 June 1943; Tokyo, Japan
- Died: 6 December 2021 (aged 78); Akita City, Japan
- Education: Chiba Institute of Technology
- Occupations: General Manager at Nintendo R&D2; Professor at Ritsumeikan University

Masayuki Uemura (上村雅之, Uemura Masayuki; 20 June 1943 – 6 December 2021) was a Japanese engineer, video game producer, and professor. He was known for his work as an employee of Nintendo from 1971 to 2004, most notably for serving as a key factor in the development of the Family Computer.

A former employee of Sharp Corporation, Uemura joined Nintendo in 1971 working with Gunpei Yokoi and Genyo Takeda on solar cell technology for the Laser Clay Shooting System arcade game. After becoming General Manager of Nintendo R&D2, Uemura served as the lead architect for the Family Computer and Super Famicom video game consoles. He retired from Nintendo in 2004 and became director for the Center for Game Studies at Ritsumeikan University.

== Education ==
Uemura graduated from the Chiba Institute of Technology with a degree in electronic engineering. He wrote in his autobiography that he very much enjoyed his learning years.

== Career ==
Uemura originally worked at Sharp Corporation after graduating from college, selling solar cell batteries. He sold photocell technology to several companies, including Nintendo, who used it for a light gun product, called a "ray gun". Gunpei Yokoi, Nintendo's main toy designer at the time, discussed with him the possibility of using Sharp's solar cells on interesting products, using their light-detecting capabilities for a shooting game. Thus, they, alongside Genyo Takeda, produced electronic light gun games where the gun would shoot a beam of light at the photocells, which would act as targets. After Uemura was hired for Nintendo in 1971, they released the Laser Clay Shooting System in January 1973, an arcade game where players shot at projected images of pigeons, with shots registered by photoreceptors. Though it was initially successful, the 1973 oil crisis led to the cancellation of most orders for the machine, leaving Nintendo, which borrowed money to expand the business, approximately ¥5 billion in debt. As the company recovered, they then produced a miniaturized version of the concept for the home market, 1976's Duck Hunt, a success that would later be adapted into the 1984 video game of the same name.

When then-Nintendo president Hiroshi Yamauchi split Nintendo into separate research & development divisions, he appointed Uemura as head of R&D2, a division that focused on hardware. Uemura led the development of the Color TV-Game line of dedicated consoles.

In November 1981, Uemura received a phone call from Yamauchi, who asked him to make "something that lets you play arcade games on your TV at home." Collaborating with Ricoh, he and his team began creating a system that could run Nintendo's hit arcade game Donkey Kong. Released in July 1983, this console became the Family Computer (commonly known by the Japanese-English term Famicom), an 8-bit console using interchangeable cartridges. Despite his initial pessimism of the console, it soon proved to be a success, selling 2.5 million units by the end of 1984. Due to the video game crash of 1983, when consumers had little trust in game consoles due to poor quality control, the Famicom underwent a redesign when brought to the United States, its first Western market. The cartridge slot was changed to be front-loading to mimic the tape deck of a VCR and to reduce the risk of static electricity in drier climates, while the NES Zapper was bundled to appeal to Americans' interest in guns. Rebranded as the Nintendo Entertainment System (NES), the console would also prove successful overseas. Uemura then designed the Family Computer Disk System, an add-on for the Famicom that played games on floppy disks.

In 1988, Uemura began designing the Super Famicom, the Famicom's 16-bit successor, which would be demonstrated to the Japanese press. He and his team worked with Ken Kutaragi, an engineer from Sony who designed the system's sound chip and would later develop the PlayStation. First released in Japan in 1990, it would be rebranded as the Super Nintendo Entertainment System in the West. In 1995, his team released the Satellaview, an add-on for the Super Famicom that let players download content via satellite broadcast.

During his time at Nintendo, he also produced video games, including Soccer, Baseball, Golf, Clu Clu Land, Ice Climber, and Marvelous: Mōhitotsu no Takarajima.

Uemura retired from Nintendo in 2004, remaining an advisor in the Research and Engineering Department. He became a professor at Ritsumeikan University, researching and teaching about video games.

On 26 February 2020, Uemura spoke at the National Videogame Museum in the United Kingdom about his career.

== Death ==
Uemura died on 6 December 2021, at the age of 78.
