= Nintendo Research & Development 2 =

Former team within Nintendo that developed software and peripherals

Nintendo Research & Development No. 2 Department
- Nintendo's logo, used during R&D2's existence

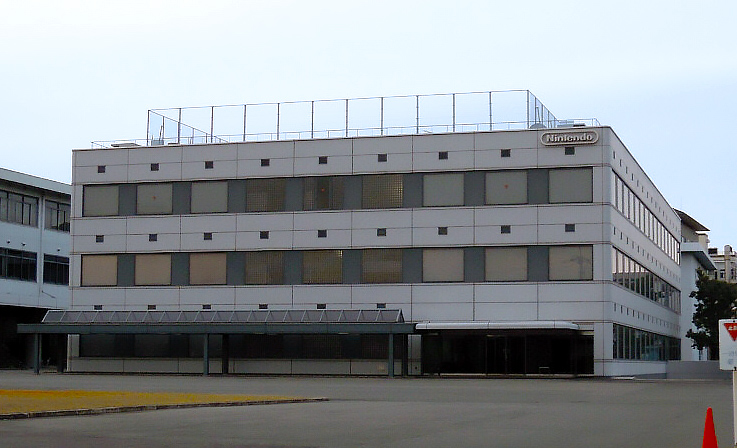
- Exterior of the former Nintendo headquarters in Kyoto, Japan, which housed the department
- Native name: 任天堂開発第二部
- Romanized name: Nintendō Kaihatsu Daini Bu
- Type: Department
- Industry: Video games
- Genre: Electronic game development; Video game console development; Video game development
- Predecessor: Nintendo Research & Development
- Founded: 1977; 49 years ago
- Founder: Hiroshi Yamauchi
- Defunct: 2004
- Fate: Absorbed into Nintendo Software Planning & Development
- Successor: Nintendo Software Planning & Development
- Headquarters: Kyoto, Japan
- Number of locations: 1 (Kyoto) (2004)
- Key people: Masayuki Uemura (General Manager); Eiji Aonuma (director)
- Parent: Nintendo Manufacturing Division

Nintendo Research & Development No. 2 Department, (Note: Japanese: 任天堂開発第二部, Hepburn: Nintendō Kaihatsu Daini Bu) commonly abbreviated as Nintendo R&D2, was a Japanese team within Nintendo that developed software and peripherals. While usually occupied in system operating software and technical support, the team would come back to early development in the 1990s where several new designers got their start at game development, the most famous being Eiji Aonuma who developed Marvelous: Another Treasure Island.

The team was formed as a spin-off of the older Nintendo Research & Development No. 1 Department and was initially led by Masayuki Uemura, who previously worked for Sharp Corporation. Using an idea of Sharp's solar technology, Uemura's department went on to develop the popular Nintendo beam gun games, selling over 1 million units. Kazuhiko Taniguchi took Uemura's position in 2004. Nintendo R&D2 was later merged into Nintendo SPD.

== History ==
In the 1970s, Nintendo created the R&D2 department.

In 2004, the department's general manager Masayuki Uemura retired from Nintendo. Following his retirement, he became a professor at the Ritsumeikan University in Kyoto, and served as an advisor to Nintendo Research & Engineering.

== Products developed ==
=== Electronic games ===
Year	Name	Ref.
1977	Color TV-Game 6	
1977	Color TV-Game 15	
1978	Color TV-Game Racing 112	
1979	Color TV-Game Block Breaker	
1980	Computer TV-Game	

=== Video game consoles ===
Year	Name	Ref.
1983–1985	Family Computer / Nintendo Entertainment System	
1990–1991	Super Famicom / Super Nintendo Entertainment System	
1995	Satellaview	

=== Video games ===
Year	Title	Platform(s)	Ref.
1980	Radar Scope	Arcade	
1983	Donkey Kong	NES	
1983	Donkey Kong Jr.	NES	
1983	Mahjong	NES	
1983	Donkey Kong Jr. Math	NES	
1991	NES Open Tournament Golf	NES	
1996	Marvelous: Mōhitotsu no Takarajima	SFC	
1997	BS Zelda no Densetsu: Inishie no Sekiban	Satellaview	
1997	Sutte Hakkun	Satellaview	
1998	Sutte Hakkun	SFC	
1999	Super Mario Bros. Deluxe	GBC	
2000	Kirby Tilt 'n' Tumble	GBC	
2001	Super Mario Advance	GBA	
2001	Super Mario World: Super Mario Advance 2	GBA	
2002	The Legend of Zelda: A Link to the Past and Four Swords	GBA	
2002	Yoshi's Island: Super Mario Advance 3	GBA	
2003	Super Mario Advance 4: Super Mario Bros. 3	GBA	
