= Ice Climber =

1985 video game

- North American NES box art with one of the protagonists, Popo, in a red parka
- Developer: Nintendo R&D1
- Publishers: Nintendo; Hudson Soft (PC-8801)
- Director: Kenji Miki
- Producers: Masayuki Uemura; Shigeru Miyamoto
- Programmers: Kazuaki Morita; Toshihiko Nakago
- Artist: Tadashi Sugiyama
- Composer: Akito Nakatsuka
- Platforms: NES, arcade, PC-8801, X1, Famicom Disk System, Nintendo e-Reader, Game Boy Advance
- Release: January 30, 1985: NES; JP: January 30, 1985; NA: October 18, 1985; EU: September 1, 1986; Arcade (VS. Ice Climber); JP: February 4, 1985; NA: March 1985; PC-8801; JP: October 1985; X1; JP: November 1985; Famicom Disk System (VS. Ice Climber); JP: November 18, 1988; e-Reader; NA: November 11, 2002; Game Boy Advance; JP: February 14, 2004; NA: June 2, 2004; EU: July 9, 2004
- Genre: Platform
- Modes: Single-player, multiplayer
- Arcade system: Nintendo VS. System

Ice Climber (Note: Japanese: アイスクライマー, Hepburn: Aisu Kuraimā) is a 1985 platform video game developed and published by Nintendo. It was released for both the arcade VS. System and the Famicom/Nintendo Entertainment System console. (Note: One book says the North American arcade release was October 1984, although contemporary flyers are all from 1985.) The main protagonists, Popo and Nana, collectively known as the Ice Climbers, scale 32 vertically scrolling, ice-covered mountains to recover stolen vegetables from a giant condor. In some European countries, Ice Climber was bundled with the Nintendo Entertainment System.

The arcade expansion, VS. Ice Climber, (Note: Japanese: VSアイスクライマー, Hepburn: VS Aisu Kuraimā) features exclusive content from the traditional NES release; including an animated title screen, a stage select menu at the start of the game and between levels, 16 more mountains, occasional blizzard and wind effects, more enemies and vegetables, and bonus multiplier items.

Popo and Nana are playable characters in the Super Smash Bros. series, starting with the 2001 game, Super Smash Bros. Melee for the GameCube. Nintendo released the NES variation for the Game Boy Advance through the Nintendo e-Reader in 2002.

== Gameplay ==
Popo scales Mountain 1 surrounded by Topis and a Nitpicker.

The first player controls Popo, a boy wearing a blue parka, while the second player controls Nana, a girl wearing a pink one. The only tool they carry is a wooden mallet to carve openings in the ice above and to club enemies. Each mountain level consists of eight layers of colorful ice and a bonus stage. Standard, dull ice blocks pose no threat other than an easily disposed-of barrier and platform. Square ice blocks with higher detail are indestructible, forcing the player to take another path. Hatched ice acts as a conveyor belt sliding Popo or Nana either left or right. Finally, many mountains include unbreakable moving platforms resembling clouds. The bonus stage takes place at the peak. Within a 40-second time limit and no enemies, the Ice Climbers often face trickier jumps and multiple moving platforms. The peak is also the only place to recover stolen vegetables, most especially eggplants. Collecting just one piece of corn from the fifth bonus stage is the only way to gain an extra life. At the top of the peak, the Condor flies overhead.

Enemies encountered on the way up the mountains include the Topi, Nitpicker, and White Bear. Topis come in two varieties: the blue seal featured in the Japanese Famicom Ice Climber release and the short Yeti-like creatures seen in Western versions and VS. Ice Climber. Topis have the ability to fill in holes in the floor with ice. To do this, a Topi scouts out an opening in the floor, runs back to its cave, and reemerges pushing an icicle to fill in two blocks. This process repeats until no more openings on their layer of ice exist. The Nitpicker is a small, mountain-dwelling bird that swoops down from icy caves on the levels' edges. Unlike the Topi, which is confined to one floor of the mountain, Nitpickers can cross over multiple ice layers. Taking them into account along with moving platforms and sliding ice, timing jumps can be more difficult. The final enemy is the White Bear. This enemy, wearing sunglasses and pink speedo, appears on screen only when Popo and Nana take too long to advance. Pounding the ice, the Polar Bear forces the screen to move up. If Nana or Popo are forced off the screen, the player loses a life.

Other obstacles include deadly falling icicles. These can form on the bottom of any type of platform. After a few successful mountains climbed, all enemies' speeds increase.

The arcade edition, VS. Ice Climber, has a few more gameplay differences. The player must pick from an initial set of 24 mountains to conquer. After eight are cleared, a Super Bonus Stage occurs in which the player must reach a high platform. Afterwards, the player must choose from the second set of 24 mountains (which feature different coloration schemes), in which the Condor is replaced by a giant butterfly. After the next eight stages are cleared and the Super Bonus is over, the player resumes the cycle from the original mountain set. The game keeps track of whether the mountain was claimed by an Ice Climber or if it remains Topi-territory—once all the stages are completed, the counter resets. Approximately 30 of the 48 level designs are borrowed from the NES game. Stage setups are generally trickier in VS. Ice Climber, with some new mechanics such as cloud platforms that move diagonally or strong gusts of wind. A purple bee with a spear flying in a horizontal pattern is included as a somewhat rare fourth enemy.

After the bonus stage, the players' scores are tallied. Points are rewarded for every brick of ice destroyed, every Topi-pushed icicle smashed, every Nitpicker knocked out and every vegetable collected. Finally, a bonus score is rewarded if a player manages to climb to the top of the bonus stage and jump up and grab the Condor. The game keeps track of the high score, although there is no way to save it on the NES version.

The game can be played in one- or two-player mode. The latter places Popo and Nana against each other in a race to the summit. Players may prefer to play cooperatively on the way up, but during the bonus round, they must compete for the top.

== Development ==
Ice Climber and NES Open Tournament Golf were directed by longtime Nintendo producer Kenji Miki. Ice Climber is the first video game programmed by Kazuaki Morita. He considered this a "warm-up" before becoming a main programmer on Super Mario Bros.. Morita was later credited with central programming roles in numerous games within the Super Mario series, The Legend of Zelda series, and in Star Fox 64.

== Releases ==
Ice Climber, a launch game for the NES in North America, has been re-released for several of Nintendo's consoles. The PC-8801 version has a more limited color palette and a reworked HUD. VS. Ice Climber has been re-released for the Famicom Disk System, removing the difficulty settings and changing a few graphics to be closer to Ice Climber (such as the bee and butterfly replaced by a Nitpicker and blue Condor, respectively). It has also been released in the Arcade Archives series on Nintendo Switch, although the bee enemy has been removed.

In addition to the releases listed below, the NES game could be unlocked for play in different versions of the original Animal Crossing. It could be played in the Japanese-exclusive Nintendo 64 version in its Nintendo Space World 2000 demo, or by using a special Controller Pak given away as a sweepstakes prize through the June 2001 issues of magazines such as Famitsu and Nintendo Dream. It is also unlockable in the GameCube releases; it can only be officially unlocked via a North America-exclusive e-Reader card, or as a gift to players requesting their save data be transferred from the Nintendo 64 version to the GameCube release.

| Name | Date | Platform | Notes |
|---|---|---|---|
| VS. Ice Climber | 1985 | Arcade | Nintendo VS. System |
| Ice Climber | 1985 | Famicom/NES | |
| Ice Climber | 1985 | NEC PC-8801 | Published by Hudson Soft |
| Ice Climber | 1988 | Famicom Disk System | Port of VS. Ice Climber |
| Ice Climber-e | 2002 | e-Reader | Barcoded cards, readable with e-Reader and Game Boy Advance. |
| Classic NES Series: Ice Climber | 2004 | Game Boy Advance | Classic NES Series |
| Ice Climber | 2007 | Wii | Virtual Console |
| Ice Climber | 2011 | 3DS | Virtual Console |
| Ice Climber | 2013 | Wii U | Virtual Console |
| Ice Climber | 2018 | Nintendo Switch | Nintendo Classics |
| Arcade Archives Ice Climber | 2019 | Nintendo Switch | Arcade Archives |

== Reception ==
The Ice Climber franchise has received generally positive reviews from critics. In Japan, Game Machine listed VS. Ice Climber in its April 1, 1985, issue as the eighth most-successful table arcade unit of the month. Former President of Finland Mauno Koivisto was reportedly keen on Nintendo games and his son-in-law has reported that Ice Climber was his favorite game.

Reviewing the American release, Computer Entertainer magazine called it "addictive" for fans of climbing games. The reviewer awarded 3.5 out of 4 stars, for both categories of graphics and gameplay, adding that it provide "hours of challenging play."

== Legacy ==
The Ice Climbers in Super Smash Bros. Ultimate.

Popo and Nana appear in the Super Smash Bros. series of fighting games as a two-in-one playable fighter under the name, Ice Climbers, voiced by Sanae Kobayashi. Appearing in 2001's Melee and 2008's Brawl, their return was planned for Super Smash Bros. for Nintendo 3DS and Wii U but technical issues with the 3DS version required game director Masahiro Sakurai to scrap development on them to maintain parity between the two versions. He said that their inclusion in said game was low-priority because the Ice Climber series was "unlikely to have another installment" at the time. The Ice Climbers returned in 2018's Ultimate.

Themes from Ice Climber regularly appear in the WarioWare series' classic Nintendo microgames. In Kirby: Nightmare in Dream Land and Kirby Air Ride, when Kirby gets the Freeze ability, he dons Popo's parka in the same manner it is worn in the Super Smash Bros. series. In Tetris DS, an Ice Climber backdrop appears among other classic Nintendo games. Daigasso! Band Brothers includes the bonus stage music theme. The Ice Climbers appear in Super Mario Maker as an unlockable Mystery Mushroom costume.
