= Famicom Disk System =

Video game console peripheral

Family Computer Disk System

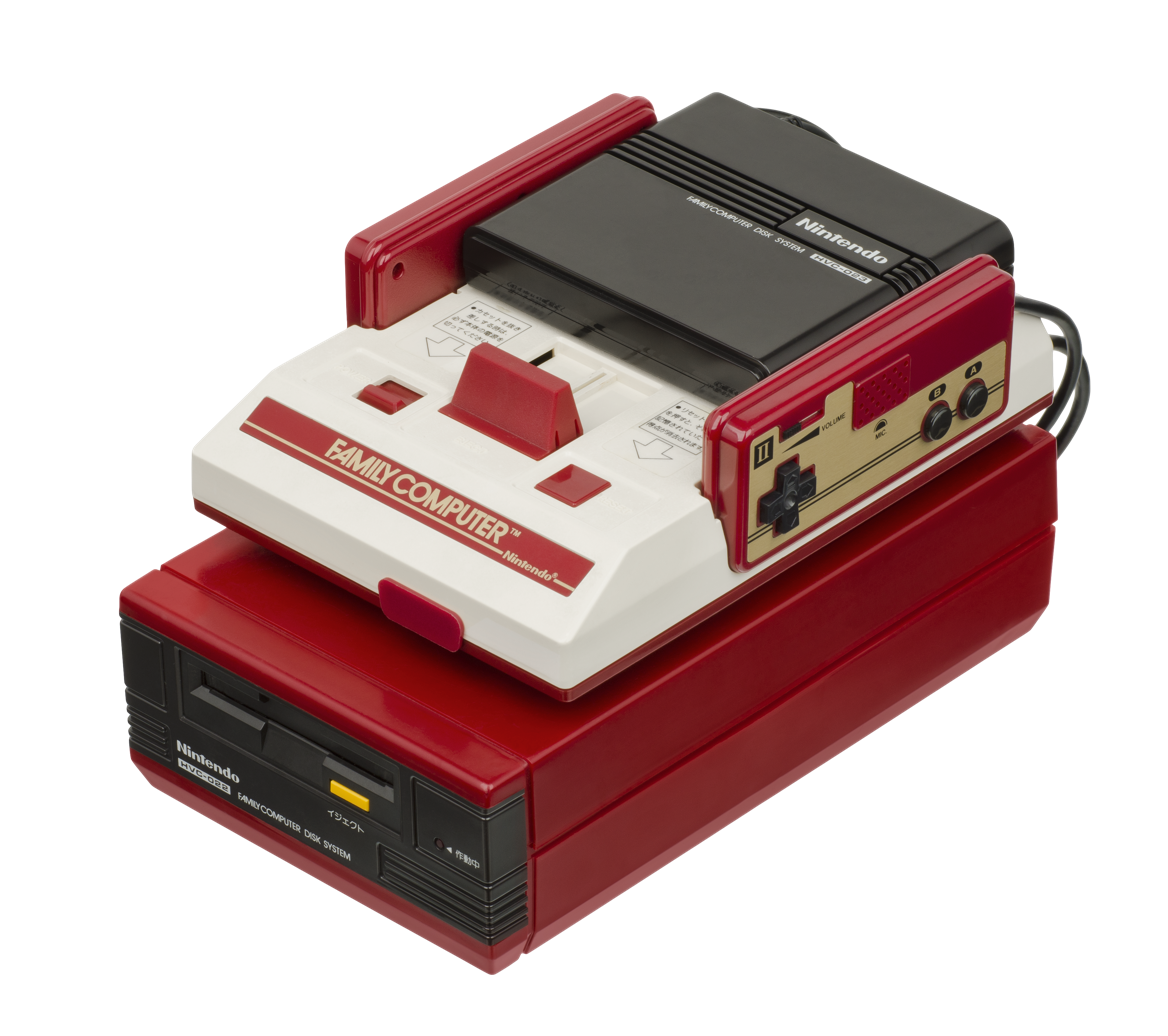
- Famicom Disk System disk drive and RAM adapter attached to the Famicom console
- Manufacturer: Nintendo
- Type: Video game console peripheral
- Generation: Third
- Released: JP: February 21, 1986; HK: 1991
- Discontinued: JP: 1993 (device); JP: September 30, 2003 (software); JP: October 31, 2007 (technical support)
- Units sold: 4.4 million
- Media: 112 KB Disk Card
- Memory: 32 KB disk cache 8 KB game RAM
- Sound: 1 extra channel of wavetable synth facilitated by Ricoh 2C33
- Successor: Satellaview; Nintendo 64DD

The Family Computer Disk System, (Note: Japanese: ファミリーコンピュータ ディスクシステム, Hepburn: Famirī Konpyūta Disuku Shisutemu; abbreviated FCD, FCDS or FDS) commonly shortened to the Famicom Disk System, (Note: Abbreviated as FDS) is a peripheral for Nintendo's Family Computer (Famicom) home video game console, released in Japan on February 21, 1986 and limited release in Hong Kong in 1991. The system uses proprietary floppy disks called "Disk Cards" for more affordable data storage and adds a high-fidelity sound channel to enhance audio in compatible Disk System games.

To support the Disk System, Nintendo installed "Disk Writer" kiosks in stores across Japan that allowed customers to bring their Disk Cards and have new games rewritten onto them for a small fee, making it a cost-effective alternative to purchasing games on traditional ROM cartridges. Nintendo also offered similar disk rewriting services by mail.

The Disk System was designed to enhance features already present in the base Famicom, offering better sound and cheaper, rewritable games. However, it came with drawbacks, including a high initial price for the device along with the storage medium's slower load times and reduced reliability. Despite these limitations, the Disk System’s rewritable storage served as an enabling technology, enabling the creation of new types of video games. This era saw the rise of expansive open world adventures like The Legend of Zelda (1986) and Metroid (1986) enabled by progress-saving, games with cost-effective and swift releases such as the best-selling Super Mario Bros. 2, and nationwide leaderboards and contests via in-store Disk Fax kiosks, which are considered to be forerunners of today's online achievement and distribution systems.

While sales of the Disk System peripheral ended in 1993, after selling 4.4 million units, making it the most successful console add-on of all time, support for the system continued well beyond that point. The final title for the Disk System was Janken Disk Jo, released on December 22, 1992. Nintendo maintained Disk writing services by mail until 2003, and provided technical support until 2007.

== History ==
The Famicom was an instant success for Nintendo. By January 1985, 18 months after its launch, over 3,000,000 units had been sold, and Nintendo was in command of the Japanese home video game market. This success came with drawbacks. It was difficult to meet retailers' stock demands, sometimes because of chip shortages, and retailers had been requesting cheaper games than those on the chip-based cartridges used by the Famicom. Consequently, Nintendo decided to investigate how to lower the cost of games.

In July 1983, Nintendo had rejected a proposal by Hudson Soft for a Famicom add-on which used Bee Cards, ROM-based cartridges tested on their MSX computer. Though this allowed for the saving of games, the technology was expensive, and royalties would be paid for each card sold. Nintendo remembered this during the research process for low-cost games, striking on releasing games on a medium similar to floppy disks, quickly becoming the standard medium for storage on personal computers. Not only were they cheap to produce, their increased capacity compared to cartridges enabled longer games, improved music and sound effects, and rewritable saves. Nintendo's proprietary platform was named the Disk Card, and based on Mitsumi's Quick Disk, a cheaper alternative to floppy disks for Japanese home computers.

Disk Cards were to be used with an add-on to the Famicom, the Famicom Disk System. This was produced by Masayuki Uemura and Nintendo R&D2, the same team which designed the Famicom. Following several delays, it was released in Japan on February 21, 1986, at a retail price of ¥15000 (US$80). Launch titles included The Legend of Zelda, and re-releases of earlier Famicom games. Aided by marketing material featuring a yellow mascot character named Diskun, or Mr. Disk, the FDS sold over 300,000 units within its first 90 days on the market, a number which had jumped to over 2,000,000 by the end of 1986. Nintendo had great confidence in the FDS, resolving to make future first-party releases exclusive to the system, installing Disk Writers, kiosks from which consumers could download games onto their disks, in toy and electronic stores, and introducing high-score tournaments for specific Disk System games, where players could submit their scores directly to Nintendo via Disk Fax machines found in retail stores. Winners would receive exclusive prizes, including Famicom-branded stationery sets and a gold-colored Punch-Out!! cartridge.

Despite the Famicom Disk System's success and advantages over the Famicom itself, it also imposed many problems of its own. Most common was the quality of the Disk Cards; not only were they fragile because the shutters on most disks were removed to reduce costs, but it was also common for them to collect fingerprints and dust, eventually rendering their games unplayable. Piracy was rampant, with disk copying devices and bootleg games becoming commonplace in stores and in magazine advertisements. Third-party developers were angered by Nintendo's requirement that it own half of the copyright of FDS games, with several, including Namco and Hudson Soft, refusing to produce games for the system. Capcom released a port of Ghosts 'n Goblins with a 128KB ROM size, proving that it was possible to publish FDS-size games on the Famicom. Retailers disliked the Disk Writer kiosks for taking up too much space and for generally being unprofitable. The Disk System's vague error messages, long loading times, and the poor quality of the rubber drive belt that spun the disks are also cited as attributing to its downfall. For these reasons, a planned American release, announced in 1986, had been canceled by November 1988, when it was approved by the Japanese branch.

By 1989, game cartridges had become easier and cheaper to produce, obsoleting the FDS. Retailers were critical of Nintendo simply abandoning the Disk Writers and leaving stores with large kiosks that took up vital space, while companies began to release or move their games from the Disk System to a standard cartridge; towards the end of development, Square ported Final Fantasy over to the Famicom as a cartridge game, with its own battery backup save feature. Nintendo officially discontinued the Famicom Disk System in 1990, selling around 4,400,000 units total. Disk writing services were still kept in operation until September 30, 2003, while technical services were provided up until October 31, 2007.

Simon & Toys, a Hong Kong goods distributor, would release the Famicom and Disk System in the region under a "Hong Kong Version" marking, including a custom "HKG" suffix on model numbers, the primary difference being differences in regional voltage standards.

=== Hardware versions ===
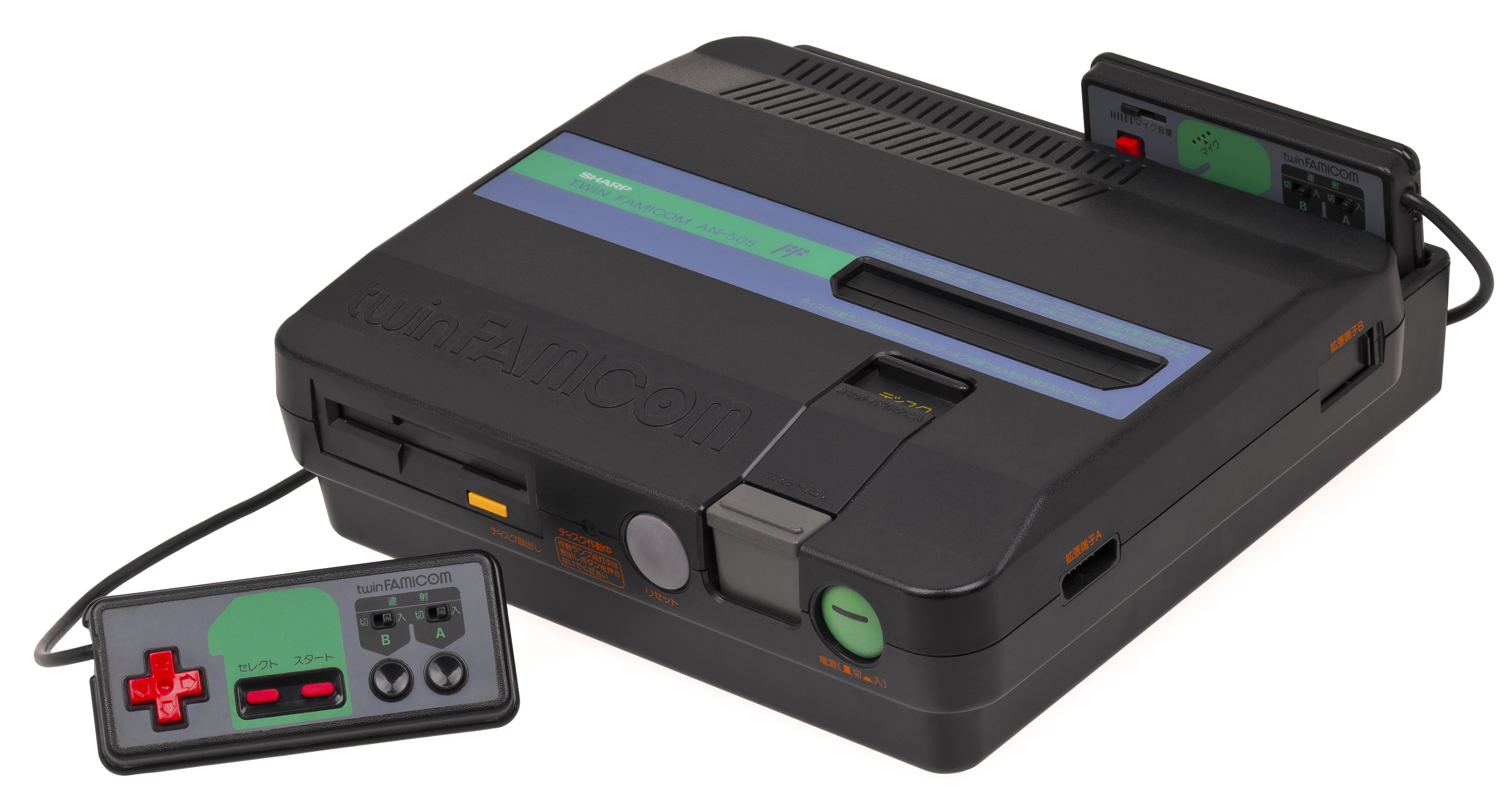
The Sharp Twin Famicom is a Famicom with built-in Disk System.

Sharp released the Twin Famicom, a Famicom model that features a built-in Disk System.

=== Disk Writer and Disk Fax kiosks ===
Widespread piracy in Japan's predominantly personal-computer-based game rental market inspired corporations to petition the government to ban the rental of all video games in 1984. With games then being available only via full purchase, demand rose for a new and less expensive way to access more games. In 1986, as video gaming had increasingly expanded from computers into the video game console market, Nintendo advertised a promise to install 10,000 Famicom Disk Writer kiosks in toy and hobby stores across Japan within one year. These jukebox-style stations allowed users to copy from a rotating stock of the latest games to their disks and keep each one for an unlimited time. To write an existing disk with a new game from the available roster was ¥500 (then about US$3.25 and 1/6 of the price of many new games). Instruction sheets were given by the retailer, or available by mail order for ¥100. Some game releases, such as Kaette Kita Mario Bros., were exclusive to these kiosks.

In 1987, Disk Writer kiosks in select locations were also provisioned as Disk Fax systems as Nintendo's first online concept. Players could take advantage of the dynamic rewritability of blue floppy disk versions of Disk System games (such as Famicom Grand Prix: F1 Race and Golf Japan Course) in order to save their high scores at their leisure at home, and then bring the disk to a retailer's Disk Fax kiosk, which collated and transmitted the players' scores via fax to Nintendo. Players participated in a nationwide leaderboard, with unique prizes.

The kiosk service was very popular and remained available until 2003. In subsequent console generations, Nintendo relaunched this online national leaderboard concept with the home satellite-based Satellaview subscription service in Japan from 1995 to 2000 for the Super Famicom. It relaunched the model of games downloadable to rewritable portable media from store kiosks, with the Nintendo Power service in Japan, which is based on rewritable flash media cartridges for the Super Famicom and Game Boy from 1997 to 2007.

Calling the Disk Writer "one of the coolest things Nintendo ever created", Kotaku said (in 2014) modern "digital distribution could learn from [the Disk Writer]", and that the system's premise of game rental and achievements would still be innovative in today's retail and online stores. Nintendo Life said it "was truly ground-breaking for its time and could be considered a forerunner of more modern distribution methods [such as] Xbox Live Arcade, PlayStation Network, and Steam".

== Technology ==
The device is connected to the Famicom console by plugging its RAM Adapter cartridge into the system's cartridge port, and attaching that cartridge's cable to the disk drive. The RAM Adapter contains 32 kilobytes (KB) of RAM for temporarily caching program data from disk, 8 KB of RAM for tile and sprite data storage, and an ASIC named the 2C33. The ASIC acts as a disk controller, plus single-cycle wavetable-lookup synthesizer sound hardware. Finally, embedded in the 2C33 is an 8KB BIOS ROM. The Disk Cards used are double-sided, with a total capacity of 112 KB per disk. Many games span both sides of a disk and a few span multiple disks, requiring the user to switch at some point during gameplay. The Disk System is capable of running on six C-cell batteries or the supplied AC adapter. Batteries usually last five months with daily game play. The inclusion of a battery option is due to the likelihood of a standard set of AC plugs already being occupied by a Famicom and a television.

The Disk System's Disk Cards are somewhat proprietary 71 mm × 76 mm (2.8 × 3 in) 56K-per-side double-sided floppy. They are a slight modification of Mitsumi's Quick Disk 71 mm 2.8 in square disk format which is used in a handful of Japanese computers and various synthesizer keyboards, along with a few word processors. QuickDisk drives are in a few devices in Europe and North America. Mitsumi already had close relations with Nintendo, as it manufactured the Famicom and NES consoles, and possibly other Nintendo hardware.

Modifications to the standard Quick Disk format include the "NINTENDO" moulding along the bottom of each Disk Card. In addition to branding the disk, this acts as a rudimentary form of copy protection - a device inside the drive bay contains raised protrusions which fit into their recessed counterparts, ostensibly ensuring that only official disks are used. If a disk without these recessed areas is inserted, the protrusions cannot raise, and the system will not allow the game to be loaded. This was combined with technical measures in the way data was stored on the disk to prevent users from physically swapping copied disk media into an official shell. However, both of these measures were defeated by pirate game distributors; in particular, special disks with cutouts alongside simple devices to modify standard Quick Disks were produced to defeat the physical hardware check, enabling rampant piracy. An advertisement containing a guide for a simple modification to a Quick Disk to allow its use with a Famicom Disk System was printed in at least one magazine.

== Games ==
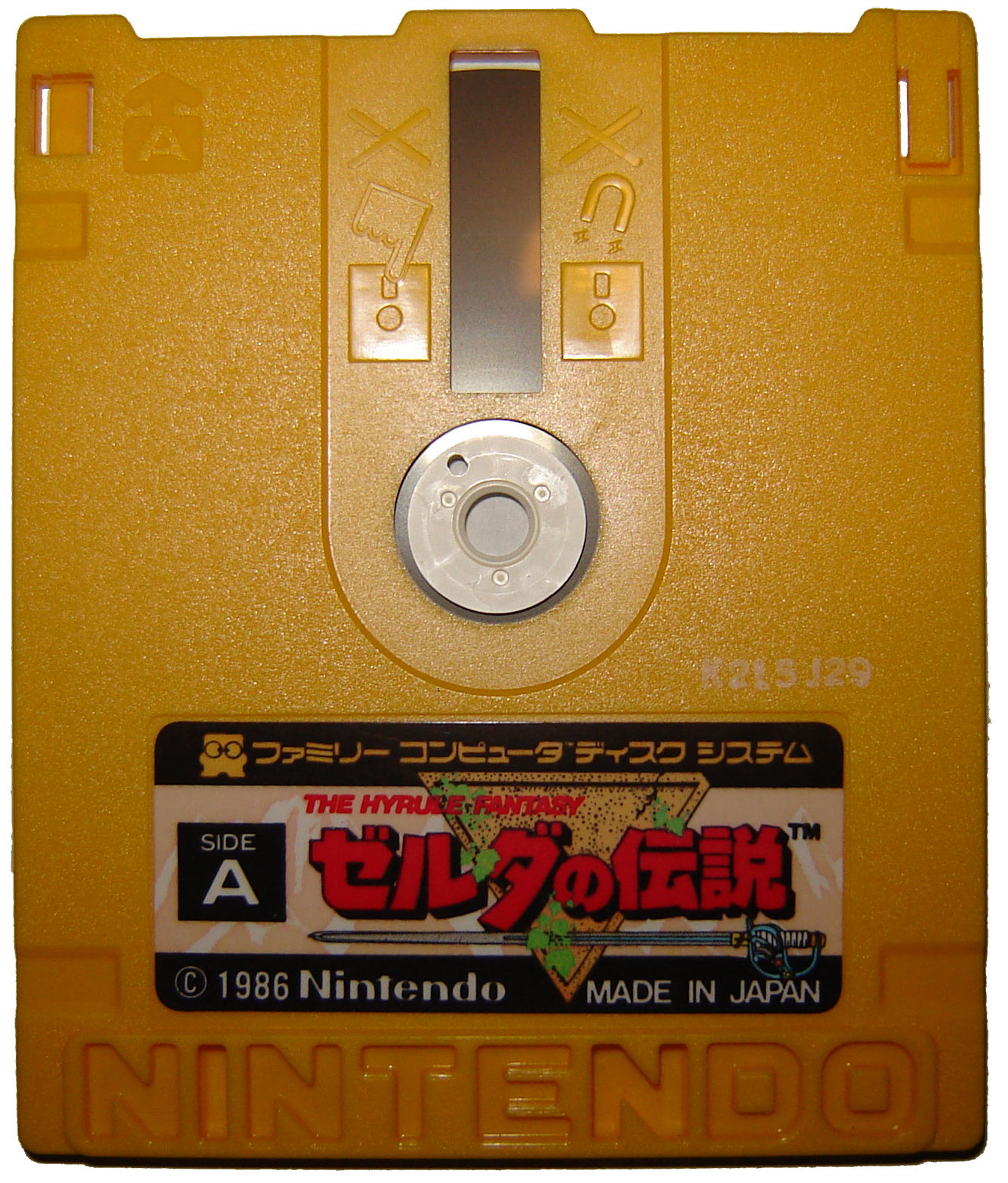
A Zelda no Densetsu (Legend of Zelda) Disk Card

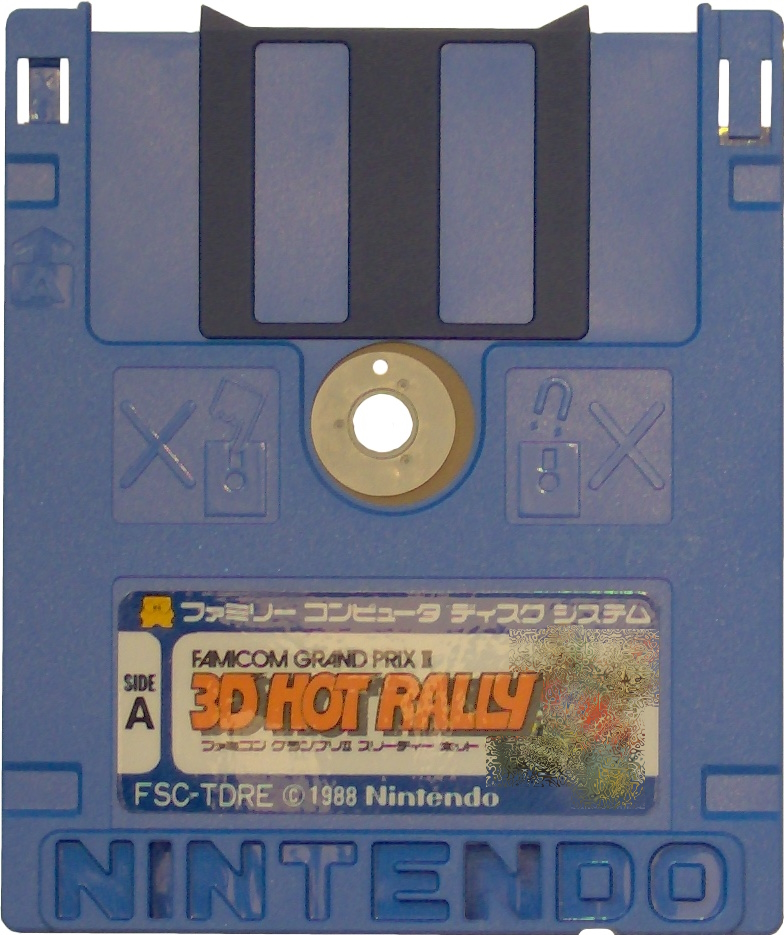
A blue 3D Hot Rally Disk Card with shutter

There are about 194 games in the Famicom Disk System's library. Some are FDS exclusives, some are Disk Writer exclusives, and many were re-released years later on the cartridge format such as The Legend of Zelda for NES in 1987, and for Famicom in 1994. The most notable FDS originals include The Legend of Zelda, Zelda II: The Adventure of Link, Kid Icarus, Metroid, and Akumajō Dracula (Castlevania).

Square had a branch called Disk Original Group, a software label that published Disk System games from Japanese PC software companies. The venture was largely a failure and almost pushed a pre-Final Fantasy Square into bankruptcy. Final Fantasy was to be released for the FDS, but a disagreement over Nintendo's copyright policies caused Square to change its position and release the game as a cartridge.

Nintendo released a disk version of Super Mario Bros. in addition to the cartridge version. The Western-market Super Mario Bros. 2 originated from the FDS-only game called Yume Kōjō: Doki Doki Panic.

Nintendo utilized the cheaper and more dynamic disk medium for a Disk Writer exclusive, as an early advergame. Kaettekita Mario Bros. (lit. The Return of Mario Bros.) is a remastered version of Mario Bros. with enhanced jump controls and high score saving, plus a new slot machine minigame co-branded for the Nagatanien food company.

The final FDS game release was Janken Disk Jō on December 22, 1992, a rock paper scissors-themed sokoban game featuring the Disk System mascot, Diskun.

== Legacy ==
The Famicom Disk System briefly served as an enabling technology for the creation of a new wave of home console video games, mostly due to tripling the size of cheap game storage compared to affordable cartridge ROMs, and by storing player's progress within more expansive new games. These games include the open world design and enduring series launches of The Legend of Zelda and Metroid (both 1986), with both games becoming very popular. Almost one decade ahead of Nintendo's Satellaview service, the FDS's writable and portable storage technology served as an enabling technology for the innovation of online leaderboards and contests via the in-store Disk Fax kiosks, which are now seen as the earliest forerunners of modern online gaming and distribution.

Within its library of 194 original games, some are FDS-exclusive and many were re-released one or two years later on cartridges for Famicom and NES, though without the FDS's additional sound channel.

== See also ==
- Sega CD - A similar peripheral for the Sega Genesis.
- Super NES CD-ROM
- 64DD
