= Carnage Heart =

1995 video game

- Developer: Artdink
- Publishers: JP: Artdink; WW: Sony Computer Entertainment
- Composers: Shingo Murakami; Kousuke Tanaka
- Platform: PlayStation
- Release: JP: December 8, 1995; NA: January 22, 1997; PAL: May 1997
- Genre: Turn-based tactics
- Mode: Single-player

Carnage Heart (Note: Japanese: カルネージハート, Hepburn: Karunēji Hāto) is a turn-based tactics video game developed by Artdink for the PlayStation. Sony Computer Entertainment released the game outside Japan in 1997.

The player takes the role of a commander in a war fought by mecha. The mecha, called Overkill Engines (OKEs), cannot be directly controlled in battle; their actions must be planned beforehand with effective tactical planning, programming and resource management, making it unique from other mecha games for its more strategic approach.

== Gameplay ==
The game features a fairly complex negotiation system that allows the player to purchase, research, or upgrade new equipment and parts. The OKEs themselves can be upgraded as well through this system, allowing for extended use of the same model for as long as possible. The various companies involved in the negotiation process can also provide valuable information about the purchases of the enemy, allowing the player to better plan for the next advance in enemy technology.

To aid the player in learning the gameplay, Carnage Heart was packaged with an unusually large amount of materials for a console game of the time: in addition to the game disc and above-average length manual, the jewel case contained a 58-page strategy guide and a tutorial disc with a 30-minute, fully voice-guided overview of most aspects of the game due to its complexity.

=== OKE production ===
The main focus of the game is in the design and programming of the OKEs. The OKEs will only be ready to produce once they have a complete hardware and software profile. Both of these profiles are stored in the form of a "card" that can be named as the player likes. It is possible for there to be a total of 28 cards, but in reality the player may use only 25, as there are three pre-made cards that can not be deleted.

Before a software profile can be created for a card, there must be a hardware profile. The first choice a player must make in the hardware creation process is that of a body type and style. There are four styles of OKE bodies and three designs in each style to choose from. These styles include a two-legged type, a tank type, a multi-legged type, and a flying type. After a body has been selected the player then must choose a main weapon, sub-weapon, engine, CPU, fuel tank size, armor thickness, and any optional equipment. A paint scheme may also be applied here as well. The engine determines how much power the robot has, the body type determines how much of that power can be used to haul mass, and all other options are limited by this. Thick armor is very heavy and usually only found on the tank types, since they are very efficient at using engine power to haul mass, while the flying type OKE will require powerful engines just to fly with the thinnest armor in the game. Each component in the hardware profile adds a certain amount of complexity to the OKE; more complex OKEs will take longer to build and require more advanced factories to produce.

Once a hardware profile has been created the player must create a software profile. The player need not have any skill in programming, however, as the game requires no programming in the traditional sense. Instead the player is given a board, which varies in size depending on the CPU selected during the hardware design phase, on which to place chips to act as a set of instructions. These chips must be placed so as to form a flow chart, with control starting from the top-left of the board, following a path through the chips, and looping back to the top left upon leaving the board. Each chip that is available to the player performs a specific task, and many can be edited to allow more precise control over actions. Most of the player's time in the game is spent creating a program and testing it through virtual battle.

Carnage Heart Software screenshot.

The action associated with a chip is performed when control flow reaches it. Actions include simple movements, aim and fire operations, scan for enemy or friendly units, incoming projectile detection, random number generators (to give, for example, a 50% chance of jumping left), variable assignments and checks, and even rudimentary inter-OKE communications, affected by assigning a color to a "channel" which can then be read by other friendly units.

After the OKEs have been set up properly, players must turn their attention to the various bases they control. It is in these bases that the actual OKEs are created, which are then formed into units, each consisting of three OKEs. OKEs are created in the factories on assembly lines that may be upgraded. The number of lines a factory has depends on the size of the base that factory is in. Some OKE designs require the lines to be upgraded in order to produce the advanced technology that the OKE employs. Sometimes a player will need advanced and powerful OKEs, and sometimes it will be more important to be able to produce a lot of OKEs quickly.

=== Combat ===
Once a player has created OKEs and formed them into units (with a maximum of three OKEs per unit), they may then assign a task to each unit; these include defending or capturing a base, patrolling, or moving to a specific location. When an enemy unit moves into the same space as one of the player's units, combat begins. The combat is carried out entirely based upon the software that was designed for each OKE during the programming phase.

The playing board itself varies in size depending on the mission. Each mission is the same, however, and only the strength of the opponent and the board itself will change. The mission is always to simply capture each enemy base on the map, and it becomes increasingly difficult as the game progresses.

== Release and reception ==
Reception

Aggregate score
| Aggregator | Score |
|---|---|
| GameRankings | 69% |

Review scores
| Publication | Score |
|---|---|
| AllGame | 3.5/5 |
| Famitsu | 7/10, 8/10, 7/10, 6/10 |
| Game Informer | 8.5/10 |
| GameRevolution | C |
| GameSpot | 6/10 |
| IGN | 9.2/10 |
| Next Generation | 4/5 |

Carnage Heart was released for the PlayStation in Japan on December 8, 1995.

The game received average reviews according to the review aggregation website GameRankings. Reviewers generally commented that its gameplay is deep, sophisticated, and well-implemented, while warning that most gamers would find its complexity overwhelming and the lack of direct control over the mecha frustrating.3/5</ Some also criticized that the battle graphics are competent but too unexciting. However, most concluded that the gameplay offers more than sufficient payoff to the time required to learn the complex mechanics, and praised the game as bringing more variety to the PlayStation library, which had been short on such cerebral games up to this time. IGN deemed it "one of the most ambitious console releases of all time", and Next Generation said it "may be the most innovative, sophisticated, and complicated strategy game ever released for a console system." GameSpot assessed it more moderately, but still positively: "For those who don't mind building a mech from the ground up, determining its every action, then relinquishing control of it when it gets on the battlefield, Carnage Heart will surely provide long hours of highly-detailed futuristic military strategy."

While Electronic Gaming Monthly never reviewed the game, their 1998 Video Game Buyer's Guide named it "Game you Need a Ph.D. to Play", citing its accompanying 60-page strategy guide with graphs and flow charts and the fact that one of the two CDs the game comes on is dedicated entirely to a tutorial. However, they added "Don't get us wrong; Carnage Heart can be rewarding once you learn how to play it."

== Sequels ==
Carnage Heart has had four sequels to date, all of which, aside from EXA, have only been released in Japan:

- Carnage Heart EZ ("easy zapping") - an improved version of the original Carnage Heart with additional programming options (macros) and tougher AI opponents. It was released for the Japanese PlayStation Network on March 24, 2009.
- Zeus Carnage Heart Second - a sequel with a new storyline, programming was similar but otherwise significantly different from the original Carnage Heart. It was released for the Japanese PlayStation Network on May 13, 2009.
- Zeus II Carnage Heart - another sequel (not to be confused with "Zeus Carnage Heart Second") with a new storyline, and vastly improved graphics over the original Carnage Heart. It was released for the Japanese PlayStation Network on June 10, 2009.
- Carnage Heart Portable (PSP) - offers improved graphics, updated chips and interface, as well as new OKE types.
- Carnage Heart EXA (PSP) - It was released in North America on March 19, 2013

== See also ==
- Armored Core: Formula Front
- Armored Core: Verdict Day, featuring UNACs, AI controlled Armored Cores which players can create and customize
- BASIC STUDIO Powerful Game Koubou, a 2001 PS2 game creation title by Artdink featuring a sample game based on their title Carnage Heart
- Breeder, a 1986 Famicom algorithm-based simulation combat game by SoftPro
- ChipWits
- COMSIGHT, a 1987 PC88, X1, and X68000 algorithm-based simulation combat game by Technosoft
- MindRover
- Omega (video game)
- Pandora Project: The Logic Master, a 1996 PS1 algorithm-based simulation combat game by Team Bughouse very similar to Carnage Heart
- Robot Odyssey
- Robot X Robot, a 1999 PS1 algorithm-based simulation combat game by Nemesys
- RoboSport
- Logic simulation
