= Armored Core: Formula Front =

2004 video game

- North American box art
- Developer: FromSoftware
- Publishers: JP: FromSoftware; NA: Agetec; AU: Red Ant Enterprises; EU: 505 Games
- Director: Nozomu Iwai
- Producer: Toshifumi Nabeshima
- Programmer: Nobuhiko Yoshino
- Composers: Tsukasa Saitoh; Ayako Minami; Hideyuki Eto
- Series: Armored Core
- Platforms: PlayStation Portable, PlayStation 2
- Release: PSP: JP: December 12, 2004; NA: December 15, 2005; AU: February 9, 2006; EU: March 3, 2006; PlayStation 2: JP: March 3, 2005
- Genres: Action, third-person shooter
- Modes: Single-player, multiplayer

Armored Core: Formula Front is a mecha video game developed by FromSoftware and published by Agetec. It was a launch title for the PlayStation Portable in Japan, the 10th main installment in the Armored Core series.

== Gameplay ==
The player assumes the role of an Architect. An Architect is a person who builds, programs and battles with a modified Armored Core known as a u/AC or an Unmanned Armored Core. u/ACs are AI controlled Armored Cores which compete exclusively in battling tournaments. u/ACs battle independent of the Architect's control, so the Architect must influence how the u/AC fights by customizing various part combinations and loading various program functions into the u/AC's AI. The North American version of the PSP game has since been modified to allow players the option of actually piloting their u/AC in battle instead of letting the AI fight. In the game, this is called a N-u/AC (N standing for Naked) and is supposedly notoriously hard to control.

Armored Core: Formula Front allows the player to build their own robot using 480 different parts. These part come in several categories. These categories are head, core, arms, legs, generator, fire control system, booster, radiator, extension, inside, right arm weapon, left arm weapon, back left weapon, back right weapon, right hangar unit, left hangar unit, and optional parts. Several different part types can also be available. For instance, there are three types of cores (OB, EO, and Standard). Other types of customization include paint, AI tune, Parts Tune, Repository, Sortie Order, Name Entry, Sample Emblem, and Edit Emblem.

== Story ==
=== Setting ===
In the game's story, Formula Front is a worldwide competition in which unmanned, AI-controlled ACs [u-ACs] are pitted against one another in fiercely contested arena battles. The game takes place twenty-five years after Formula Front arena warfare was introduced. It is now the world's most popular form of entertainment. At the heart of Formula Front's success are the architects. These are the individuals responsible for assembling and programming the u-ACs entered into league matches.

=== Plot ===
As the player fights their way into the Regular League, they are confronted by a new team, BT Wyvern, and its architect, Linus. After two matches against BT Wyvern, Linus sends a message that he meet the player again. Rank after rank, the player again confronts a formidable opponent, Team Ogre, and its architect, Diablo. Though Ogre usually wins through harsh tactics, their battle against BT Wyvern was horrible. Fortunately, the player defeated Diablo. As the player gets nearer through the top ranks, they are again confronted by BT Wyvern with a new AC model, Force Wing X. Afterwards, Diablo confronts the player again with an AC similar to Linus' AC and has installed with a mysterious data in Diablo's AC. The player manages to defeat Diablo and Team Ogre was temporarily banned due to being accused of stealing the 'Master Data'.

After defeating the second rank Team Neonia and its architect, Raving, the player has the right to challenge Team Testarossa Artigiana ('Arti' for short) and FFA's top architect, Bren. After the player defeats Bren, they become the new top architect.

== Release ==
Formula Front is the first Armored Core game to be released on multiple platforms, originally on the PlayStation Portable and later on the PlayStation 2. In Japan it was released simply as Armored Core: Formula Front. In North America, the game was modified and released on December 15, 2005 as Armored Core: Formula Front Extreme Battle, often mislabeled as Armored Core: Formula Front Special Edition; however, the PlayStation 2 version was not released in North America. The then-upcoming American version of the game was re-released on November 17, 2005 in Japan entitled Armored Core: Formula Front International (アーマード・コア フォーミュラフロント インターナショナル, Āmādo Koa Fōmyura Furonto Intānashonaru); this re-released edition is considered to be the ultimate edition as it also contains a large amount of additional battles not found in the American version of the game, and includes both Japanese and English text options (except for the tutorial videos which are only in Japanese). Later released fan-made patch addressed the issue, translating the videos.

== Reception ==
Reception

Aggregate score
Aggregator	Score
Metacritic	66/100

Review scores
Publication	Score
1Up.com	B+
Eurogamer	6/10
Famitsu	(PSP) 30/40 (PS2) 28/40
Game Informer	3.75/10
GameSpot	7.5/10
GameSpy	3.5/5
GameZone	7/10
IGN	6.5/10
Official U.S. PlayStation Magazine	3.5/5
PALGN	6/10
Detroit Free Press	2/4

The PSP version received "average" reviews according to the review aggregation website Metacritic. In Japan, Famitsu gave the game a score of 30 out of 40 (8/7/8/7) for the PSP version, and 28 out of 40 for the PlayStation 2 version.

== See also ==
- Armored Core: Verdict Day, featuring UNACs, AI controlled Armored Cores which players can create and customize
- BASIC STUDIO Powerful Game Koubou, a 2001 PS2 game creation title by Artdink featuring a sample game based on their title Carnage Heart
- Breeder, a 1986 Famicom algorithm-based simulation combat game by SoftPro
- ChipWits
- COMSIGHT, a 1987 PC88, X1, and X68000 algorithm-based simulation combat game by Technosoft
- MindRover
- Omega (video game)
- Pandora Project: The Logic Master, a 1996 PS1 algorithm-based simulation combat game by Team Bughouse very similar to Carnage Heart
- Robot Odyssey
- Robot X Robot, a 1999 PS1 algorithm-based simulation combat game by Nemesys
- RoboSport
- Logic simulation
