= RoboSport =

1991 video game

- Developers: Maxis; Presage Software (Windows)
- Publisher: Maxis
- Designer: Edward Kilham
- Platforms: Windows 3.0, Mac, Amiga
- Release: 1991
- Genre: Turn-based tactics
- Mode: Multiplayer

RoboSport is a 1991 turn-based tactics video game created by Edward Kilham and developed and published by Maxis.

Gameplay screenshot

The player creates teams of robots and maneuvers them around a board to map out one "turn" of movement. The other players and AI do the same and then all movement is played out simultaneously. The robots are equipped with different weapons, including rifles, grenade launchers, and so on. The game supports multiple modes such as capture the flag and a "hostage" game.

Maxis developed RoboSport for Mac and Windows 3.0. In 1992, it was converted to the Amiga by The Dreamers Guild.

== Reception ==
Reception

Review scores
Publication	Score
Computer Gaming World	2/5
Dragon	5/5

The game was reviewed in 1991 in Dragon #172 by Hartley, Patricia, and Kirk Lesser in "The Role of Computers" column. The reviewers gave the game 5 out of 5 stars. Computer Gaming World praised the Windows version of RoboSport for its excellent user interface, ease of programming, and quick play. The magazine concluded that it was "at least three excellent games crammed into one nearly seamless sport". A later article reported that the game depicted small arms and combined arms tactics better "than many computer wargames dedicated to the subject". A 1994 survey in the magazine of strategic space games set in the year 2000 and later gave the game three-plus stars out of five. Alfred Giovetti, writing for Compute!, praised the game for the flexibility of programming computer robots that would then fight providing an interesting outcome. Macworld highly recommended the game for strategy game enthusiasts.

== See also ==
- Armored Core: Formula Front
- Armored Core: Verdict Day, featuring UNACs, AI controlled Armored Cores which players can create and customize
- BASIC STUDIO Powerful Game Koubou, a 2001 PS2 game creation title by Artdink featuring a sample game based on their title Carnage Heart
- Breeder, a 1986 Famicom algorithm-based simulation combat game by SoftPro
- ChipWits
- COMSIGHT, a 1987 PC88, X1, and X68000 algorithm-based simulation combat game by Technosoft
- MindRover
- Omega (video game)
- Pandora Project: The Logic Master, a 1996 PS1 algorithm-based simulation combat game by Team Bughouse similar to Carnage Heart
- Robot Odyssey
- Robot X Robot, a 1999 PS1 algorithm-based simulation combat game by Nemesys
- Logic simulation
