= Robot Odyssey =

1984 video game

- Developers: Mike Wallace; Dr. Leslie Grimm
- Publisher: The Learning Company
- Platforms: Apple II, MS-DOS, TRS-80 Color Computer
- Release: December 1984
- Genre: Programming
- Mode: Single-player

Robot Odyssey is a digital logic game developed by Mike Wallace and Dr. Leslie Grimm and published by The Learning Company in December 1984. It is a sequel to Rocky's Boots, and was released for the Apple II, TRS-80 Color Computer, and MS-DOS. The player is readying for bed when, suddenly, they fall through the floor into an underground city of robots, Robotropolis. The player begins in the sewers of the city with three programmable robots, and must make their way to the top of the city to try to find their way home again. Most players have found it challenging.

== Gameplay ==
The aim of Robot Odyssey is to program and control robots (Sparky, Checkers, and Scanner with a fourth added in later levels) in order to escape Robotropolis, a labyrinthine underground city filled with hundreds of rooms of puzzles that need to be solved to progress any further. The city consists of five levels of increasing difficulty, requiring the design of more and more sophisticated circuits.

A tutorial and robot testing laboratory (the "Innovation Lab") are also provided with the game.

Except for their color and initial programming, the three robots are identical inside. They are equipped with four thrusters and bumper sensors, a grabber, a radio antenna (for basic communication with other robots), a battery, and a periscope to use while riding inside a robot.

Throughout the game, the player is presented with various challenges which require programming the three robots to accomplish various tasks. This is done by wiring a synchronous digital circuit, consisting of logic gates and flip-flops, inside of the robots. Tasks and puzzles range from navigating a simple maze and retrieving items to complex tasks requiring interaction and communication between two or more robots. Though the player can ride inside the robots, most challenges involve the robots acting autonomously and cannot be completed with the player inside (and perhaps simply rewiring their robot on the fly).

The robots can also be wired up to chips, which provide a convenient and reproducible way to program the robots. Various pre-programmed chips are scattered throughout the city and range from complex circuits such as a wall-hugging chip which can be used to navigate through mazes and corridors (one of which is wired to a robot at the beginning) to clocks and counters. The player must find out how these chips work themselves, as the only information about each chip is a short, and sometimes cryptic, description. Additionally, there are predesigned chip files stored on the various disks containing the game that can be loaded into the in-game chips. The available chips stored in this fashion vary depending on the port or version used.

The Innovation Lab can be used to test out circuit designs in the robots or create new chips. Chips created in the lab can then be loaded into and used in the main game. Loading a chip in the main game will erase the previous programming stored in the chip.

Although the game is recommended for ages 10 and up, it can prove to be quite challenging even for adults. In terms of educational value, the game teaches the basic concepts of electrical engineering and digital logic in general.

== Reception ==
Computer Gaming World reviewed Robot Odyssey and ChipWits, preferring the former to the latter but stating that both were "incredibly vivid simulation experiences".

== Legacy ==
The engine for the game was written by Warren Robinett, and variants of it were used in many of The Learning Company's graphical adventure games of the time, including Rocky's Boots, Gertrude's Secrets, Gertrude's Puzzles, and Think Quick!, all of which are similar but easier logic puzzle games. The gameplay and visual design were derived from Robinett's influential Atari 2600 video game, Adventure.

ChipWits by Doug Sharp and Mike Johnston, a 1984 game for Macintosh later ported to the Apple II, and Commodore 64 computers, is similar in theme but the player's robot behaviour is programmed with actions blocks instead of using logic flops, switches, etc.

Epsitec Games created Colobot and Ceebot for Windows. The player programs machines through object-oriented programming like Java, C++, or C# to accomplish puzzle tasks. The objective of these games was to teach the player the fundamentals of these languages.

Carnage Heart involves programming mechas that then fight without any user input.

Cognitoy's MindRover is also similar in spirit to Robot Odyssey, but uses different programming concepts in its gameplay.

=== Clones ===
One Girl One Laptop productions created a free to download spiritual successor, for Windows and MacOS, called GATE which uses the same digital logic puzzles as Robot Odyssey.

There is also a clone that can be run in any system with a Java runtime, DroidQuest, which contains all the original levels and an additional secret level.

== See also ==
- Armored Core: Formula Front
- Armored Core: Verdict Day, featuring UNACs, AI controlled Armored Cores which players can create and customize
- BASIC STUDIO Powerful Game Koubou, a 2001 PS2 game creation title by Artdink featuring a sample game based on their title Carnage Heart
- Breeder, a 1986 Famicom algorithm-based simulation combat game by SoftPro
- ChipWits
- COMSIGHT, a 1987 PC88, X1, and X68000 algorithm-based simulation combat game by Technosoft
- MindRover
- Omega (video game)
- Pandora Project: The Logic Master, a 1996 PS1 algorithm-based simulation combat game by Team Bughouse similar to Carnage Heart
- Robot X Robot, a 1999 PS1 algorithm-based simulation combat game by Nemesys
- RoboSport
- Logic simulation
