= Time Twister =

Time Twister may refer to:

- Timetwister, a Magic: The Gathering card
- Time Twister, an expansion to RollerCoaster Tycoon 2
- The Time Twister, a novel in the Children of the Red King series
- "Time Twister", an episode of The Problem Solverz

== See also ==
- Time Twist: Rekishi no Katasumi de..., a 1991 Japanese video game
- "Space Time Twister", an episode of The Twisted Tales of Felix the Cat
