= Mobile Suit Z Gundam: Hot Scramble =

1986 video game

- Family Computer cover art
- Developer: Game Studio
- Publisher: Bandai
- Designers: Masanobu Endō; Satoshi Naito
- Programmers: Hiroshi Shimaoka; Koichi Yamamoto
- Composers: Neil Sedaka; Nobuyuki Ohnogi
- Series: Gundam
- Platforms: Family Computer, Game Boy Advance
- Release: Family Computer: JP: August 28, 1986; Game Boy Advance: JP: March 18, 2004
- Genre: First-person rail shooter
- Mode: Single-player

Kidō Senshi Z Gundam: Hot Scramble, (Note: Japanese: 機動戦士Ζガンダム・ホットスクランブル, Hepburn: Kidō Senshi Zē Gandamu: Hotto Sukuranburu) also known as Mobile Suit Z Gundam: Hot Scramble, is a 1986 rail shooter video game developed by Game Studio and published by Bandai for the Family Computer (also known as Famicom in Japan and Nintendo Entertainment System internationally). It is based on the anime Mobile Suit Z Gundam, and is one of the first Gundam video games.

The game sold over 400,000 copies, helping to launch the Gundam video game franchise. Aside from the much later Famicom Mini release, there were two versions of the game: the original release; and a special release of the central location test version, sometimes dubbed Final Version. Only 1,000 copies of this second version were ever released, making it among the rarest video games in history.

== Gameplay ==
Confronting a small squadron of Hizacks while on space patrol

The first two parts are forward scrolling, the first taking place on earth, the second in open space and ending with either a boss battle, ranging from a Musai to the Jupitris, Paptimus Scirocco's flagship, or simply a colony or asteroid (Gryps, Axis, etc.). During these levels, player's gun is visible on screen, and can aim at and lock-on to enemies while shooting. Following this is a standard platforming section which concludes the destruction of the ship, colony, or base's reactor. Three power ups in the game include a shield, which prevents some damage, a beam rifle, which allows penetrating shots on the platformer portion, and health.

Hot Scramble consists of 16 primary levels, with enemy MS appearing in order roughly corresponding to their appearance chronologically in Zeta Gundam television series. After the 16th level is beaten, another series of levels loops endlessly, however if the 16th level is cleared, a game over will display credits with a looping sprite of Zeta pilot Fa Yuiry running, the rebuilt Haro bouncing at her side, as in the show's ending.

Similar to boss fights, at certain stages, Mobile Suits such as the Psyco Gundam, Psyco Gundam MkII, Pallas Athena, or Qubeley will appear and must be destroyed (one shot, unlike bosses which take multiple hits) for the player to proceed from either the ground phase to the space phase or, during the space phase, to the boss fight.

== Development ==
Mobile Suit Z Gundam: Hot Scramble was developed by Game Studio and published by Bandai for the Family Computer. The game was designed by Game Studio founder Masanobu Endō, who had previously worked for Namco and created widely-successful games such as Xevious and The Tower of Druaga. When the Gundam franchise was rising in popularity by the mid-1980's, Bandai commissioned Game Studio to develop a Gundam game for the Family Computer, the most popular video game console in Japan at the time. Hot Scramble is based on Mobile Suit Zeta Gundam, the sequel anime series to the original Mobile Suit Gundam. Endō was a fan of Gundam and its mecha designer Mamoru Nagano, and specifically chose to base it off of Zeta due to its popularity. Endo approached Namco about publishing the game, who denied the offer after their video game adaptation of Macross was a commercial failure.

Hot Scramble is the first Gundam game for a home console. Prior to its release, Gundam games had been released for the MSX computer and as LCD handheld games from the early 1980's. For this reason, Bandai allowed Endō to add as much content and resources into the game as he needed. Endō decided to make Hot Scramble a 3D first-person shooter, a concept that was largely unheard of on the Family Computer. He believed it would make it stand out, and as a way to experiment with the limited 3D effects of the console. Most of the game takes place on a black background with a scrolling starfield, as Endō believed it created the illusion of depth. The soundtrack for Hot Scramble was composed by Nobuyuki Ohnogi, who had also worked for Namco on games such Pole Position, Galaga, and New Rally-X.

For it being the franchise's first appearance on a home console, Endō worked to make the game fun and as close to its source material as possible. Originally, Hot Scramble only featured the first-person segments, and was significantly harder. When it was received poorly during playtesting, Bandai retooled the game to include side-scrolling levels and an easier difficulty. Endō didn't have as much involvement with the second version, aside from providing tweaks to the difficulty and altering its gameplay to be more user-friendly. Because Hot Scramble was a highly-anticipated title, Bandai requested the development team to add as many Gundam robots as possible into the game.

== Release ==
To promote the game, Endō and Bandai worked on creating a massive marketing campaign. Endō himself appeared in most of the game's television commercials. Hot Scramble comes in a larger-sized box with bright, colorful artwork, which was done to catch the attention of customers in game and electronic stores. Hot Scramble was released on August 28, 1986. The original version of Hot Scramble was given a limited production run of 1,000 copies, released as part of a contest from Bandai. This version is often referred to as Hot Scramble Final Version, and features a shiny, silver-colored cartridge shell. It is one of the rarest and most sought-after games on the Famicom, with original copies demand over $1,000 on online auction sites such as Yahoo! Auctions.

Mobile Suit Z Gundam: Hot Scramble was re-released for the Game Boy Advance on March 18, 2004, as part of the Famicom Mini line of re-releases. It was one of only two games released under the Famicom Mini Extra brand, alongside Dai-2-Ji Super Robot Taisen, and was produced as a raffle prize to those that purchased Kidō Senshi Gundam: Senshitachi no Kiseki on the GameCube. An estimated 2,000 copies of this version were printed, and were given away on the official Senshitachi No Kiseki website.

== Reception ==
Reception

Review score
Publication	Score
Family Computer Magazine	18.67/30

Mobile Suit Z Gundam: Hot Scramble was a commercial success for Bandai. According to Endō, the game sold over 400,000 copies. Famitsu listed it as the best-selling shooter game for home systems in Japan between 1986 and 1992. The game's success gave Bandai hope in the Gundam franchise being a profitable intellectual property for home game consoles, which helped launch the Gundam video game franchise. As of 2020, over 30 million Gundam games have been sold, making it one of the best-selling video game franchises of all time.

Mobile Suit Z Gundam: Hot Scramble attracted mixed reviews from critics. A reviewer for Family Computer Magazine praised the first-person shooting segments for being fun to play, comparing them to games such as Star Luster, as well as the amount of Gundam robots that were included. At the same time, the reviewer disliked the side-scrolling segments for seeming unpolished, and felt the game would have been better off without them. The 1991 book Famicom ROM Cassette All Catalog recommended the game primarily to Gundam fans, specifically for its usage of music from the Mobile Suit Zeta Gundam anime series and large amount of characters. They also disliked its side-scrolling levels for not being much fun to play through, and agreed with Family Computer Magazine that they should have been removed.

In 2004, Carlo Savorelli of Hardcore Gaming 101 commended the game for its faithfulness to its source material and focus on action. Comparing it to other Gundam games available, Carlo praised Hot Scramble for being a pure-action game instead of a text-heavy tactical role-playing game. He enjoyed the game's first-person levels for being technologically-impressive for the Famicom, commenting that they have a "stunning" execution, but criticized the side-scrolling levels for their controls and poor background designs. Carlo concluded his review with: "At any rate, this is a sadly overlooked (in the West) 3D shooter for the Famicom that deserves to become better than being known by Gundam fans alone. Check it out."

== See also ==
- List of Gundam video games
