= Gertrude's Puzzles =

1982 educational video game

- Box art for IBM PC version
- Developer(s): The Learning Company
- Publisher(s): The Learning Company
- Platform(s): Apple II, Commodore 64, IBM PC
- Release: Apple II; NA: 1982; C64, IBM PC; NA: 1984
- Genre(s): Educational

Gertrude's Puzzles is an educational video game for the Apple II, Commodore 64, and IBM PC compatibles released in 1984 by The Learning Company. It is a sequel to the game Gertrude's Secrets. Gertrude's Puzzles was designed by Teri Perl. Gertrude's Puzzles, like Gertrude's Secrets, consists of a series of rooms, each of which contains a logic or categorization puzzle to solve using shapes and colors.

== See also ==
- Rocky's Boots
- Robot Odyssey
