= Kidō Senshi Gundam: Senshitachi no Kiseki =

2004 video game

- Developer: BEC
- Publisher: Bandai
- Composer: Takanori Arima
- Series: Mobile Suit Gundam
- Platform: GameCube
- Release: JP: March 18, 2004
- Genre: Third-person shooter
- Mode: Single-player

Kidō Senshi Gundam: Senshitachi no Kiseki (機動戦士ガンダム 戦士達の軌跡, Kidō Senshi Gandamu: Senshitachi no Kiseki, lit. "Mobile Suit Gundam: Pilot's Locus") is a 2004 third-person shooter video game developed by BEC and published by Bandai. The game was released only in Japan and a part of the Mobile Suit Gundam series. A Game Boy Advance version of Mobile Suit Z Gundam: Hot Scramble under the Famicom Mini series was released as a limited edition raffle prize for players who purchased the game.
