= Warren Robinett =

American video game designer (born 1951)

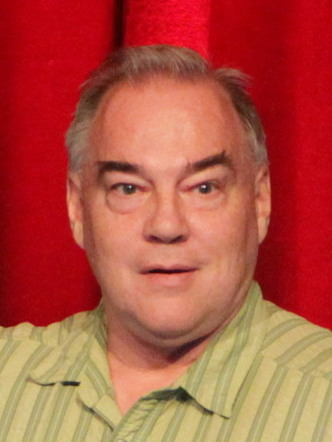
- Robinett in 2015
- Born: Joseph Warren Robinett Jr. December 25, 1951 (age 74); Springfield, Missouri, US
- Education: Rice University (B.A.); University of California, Berkeley (M.S.)
- Occupation: Interactive computer graphics software designer
- Known for: Adventure (Atari 2600); Rocky's Boots (Apple II)

Joseph Warren Robinett Jr. (born December 25, 1951) is an American video game designer. He is most notable as the developer of the Atari 2600's Adventure and as a founder of The Learning Company, where he designed Rocky's Boots and Robot Odyssey. More recently he has worked on virtual reality projects.

Robinett graduated in 1974 with a B.A. from Rice University, with a major in "Computer Applications to Language and Art". After graduating from Rice University, he was a Fortran programmer for Western Geophysical in Houston, Texas. He received an M.S. from University of California, Berkeley in 1976, and went to work at Atari, Inc. in November 1977.

== Atari, Inc. ==
His first effort at Atari was Slot Racers for the Atari 2600. While he was working on it, he had discovered and played Crowther and Woods' Colossal Cave Adventure at the Stanford Artificial Intelligence Laboratory, and decided that a graphical video game version "would be really cool". However, with 128 bytes of RAM and 4096 bytes of ROM, Atari's Adventure was a much simpler program, and with only a joystick for input, the set of "commands" was necessarily brief. Adventure was a hit upon its 1979 release, and it eventually sold a million copies.

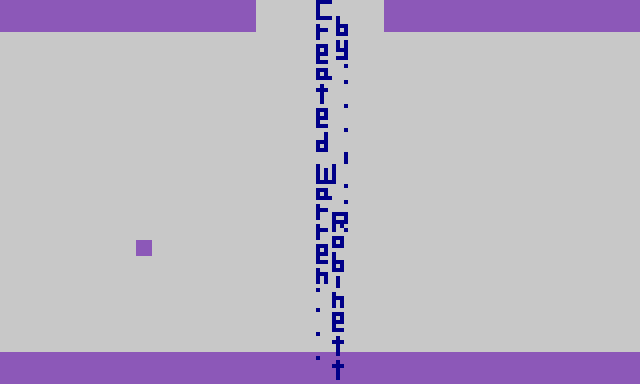
The Adventure Easter egg: "Created by Warren Robinett"

Atari designers at the time were not given credit for their games, because Atari feared having to bargain with well-known designers. In response to this, Robinett placed a hidden object in the game that would allow the player to reach a hidden screen which displayed the words "Created by Warren Robinett," hence creating one of the earliest known Easter eggs in a video game, and the first to which the name "Easter egg" was applied.

Robinett then wrote the BASIC Programming cartridge, finishing both BASIC Programming and Adventure in June 1979, and quit Atari.

== The Learning Company and later ==
He founded The Learning Company in 1980, and he worked on several educational games there, including Rocky's Boots and Robot Odyssey for the Apple II. The Learning Company was acquired by Softkey in 1995 for US$606 million.

He has since worked on virtual reality projects for NASA and the University of North Carolina.

In 2016, Robinett announced The Annotated Adventure, a book describing the design and implementation of Adventure for the Atari 2600. In 2018 Robinett stated that the initial book was being split into two books: The Annotated Adventure focusing on the technical aspect of the game and Making the Dragon focusing on the political story. As of December 2022 only the table of contents has been made public.

Robinett's Adventure Easter egg is a plot element in the 2011 novel and 2018 film Ready Player One.
