= Super Robot Taisen: Original Generation =

2002 video game

- Developer: Banpresoft
- Publishers: JP: Banpresto; NA: Atlus; EU: 505 Games
- Platform: Game Boy Advance
- Release: JP: November 22, 2002; NA: August 8, 2006; PAL: December 31, 2007
- Genre: Tactical role-playing
- Mode: Single player

Super Robot Taisen: Original Generation (Note: Japanese: スーパーロボット大戦ORIGINAL GENERATION, Hepburn: Sūpā Robotto Taisen Orijinaru Jenerēshon) is a tactical role-playing game for the Game Boy Advance. It was developed by Banpresoft and published by Banpresto in Japan, Atlus in North America, and 505 Games in Europe.

The game was originally released in Japan on November 22, 2002, and stars various original characters created by Banpresto for their Super Robot Wars series. Like the much earlier Super Robot Wars Gaiden, the game features no licensed mecha or characters at all - instead, it uses only Banpresto's own creations, in an original story. The games sold well in Japan, and later adapted for a short animated OVA called Super Robot Wars Original Generation: The Animation, which takes place after the second game in the series. A television series, Super Robot Wars Original Generation: Divine Wars, retells the story of the first game. Original Generation was released in the United States on August 8, 2006. It is the first game in the Super Robot Wars series to ever be commercially released overseas, since, unlike the rest of the series, it contains no characters from other media, therefore, no legal entanglements were involved in a foreign release.

A sequel, Super Robot Taisen: Original Generation 2, was available on February 3, 2005, in Japan and was released in North America on November 21, 2006. On June 27, 2007, Super Robot Wars: Original Generations, an enhanced remake of both Original Generation games, was released in Japan for the PlayStation 2.

== Gameplay ==
Original Generation offers the player a choice to play the game from the perspective of either two male protagonists, both of whom find themselves fighting the Divine Crusaders and the Aerogaters from different fronts. While both routes share similarities, each character has his own unique missions to follow, as well as meeting different people and piloting different mechs in their respective scenarios. Regardless of who the player chooses, both protagonists and their parties will eventually join up to form one large cast, with brief branching stages, based on the character chosen in the beginning of the game.

As a first in the Super Robot Wars franchise, Original Generation allows the player to equip or remove weapons on mechs. For example, the Plasma Saber equipped on the Weiss Ritter can be removed and placed on the R-1 for its pilot to utilize during sorties. However, this unique system is only available on mechs that are of the real-type, while super robots are not capable of switching weapons. The game also allows the use of customizing playable pilots, through a set of pilot skills, bought by Pilot Points, received from defeating enemy units. These Pilot Points can also be used to upgrade their stats that determine how well he/she performs in battle as well as their terrain adaptivity.

== Plot ==
It is two hundred years after the beginning of the "Space Era", a time period when civilization began expanding into space. However, by the start of the 21st century, two meteors struck and destroyed much of the Earth, sending humanity into chaos. By year 179 of the Space Era, secret technology, dubbed Extra-Over Technology, or EOT, was discovered by the Earth Federal Government within a third meteor that had hit Earth at the Marquesas Islands in the South Pacific. Dr. Bian Zoldark, while investigating the meteor, also found out that the creators of the Extra-Over Technology were heading to Earth to reclaim it. In order to defend Earth, the government starts to develop a group of humanoid mecha, known as Personal Troopers.

The alien race that created Extra-Over Technology, called the Aerogaters by the Earth Federal Government, initially attacks an Earth ship sent out to investigate their presence in the far reaches of the Solar System. This initial skirmish ends in a defeat for the Aerogaters, prompting them to seek for negotiations with the Earth Federation Army. Talks are arranged to take place at a secret facility in Antarctica, but the talks are targeted by a rogue faction called the Divine Crusaders.

The Divine Crusaders destroys the Aerogater delegation, then turn on the Federation forces. Bian Zoldark, revealing himself to be the leader of the Divine Crusaders, announces the existence of the Aerogaters to the world and rebel against the Earth Government. As Earth spins into civil war, a new Aerogater force is on the move, seeking to reclaim their lost technology...

== Originating games ==
The characters, units and setting in Original Generation are all taken from the following games:

- Shin Super Robot Wars
- Super Robot Wars Gaiden: Masō Kishin – The Lord Of Elemental
- 2nd Super Robot Wars
- Super Robot Wars F
- Super Robot Wars F Final
- Super Robot Wars Alpha
- Super Robot Wars Alpha Gaiden
- Super Robot Wars Compact 2
- Super Robot Wars Impact
- Super Hero Operations
- Hero Senki: Project Olympus
- Super Robot Wars Scramble Gather

== Release and reception ==
Reception

Review score
| Publication | Score |
|---|---|
| Famitsu | 8/10, 8/10, 8/10, 8/10 |

Super Robot Taisen: Original Generation was released in Japan for the Game Boy Advance on November 22, 2002.

== See also ==
- Super Robot Taisen: Original Generation 2
- Super Robot Wars
- Super Robot Wars Original Generation: Divine Wars
- Super Robot Wars: Original Generations
