= Doremikko =

1987 music video game

DoReMikko
- Developer: Konami
- Publisher: Konami
- Platform: Family Computer Disk System
- Release: JP: 1987
- Genre: Music video game
- Mode: Single-player

DoReMikko (Note: Japanese: ドレミッコ) is a music video game developed by Konami, and published for the Family Computer Disk System in 1987. The game's title comes from the first three solfège syllables, do, re, and mi.

Konami bundled DoReMikko with a 36-key musical keyboard input device for playing and composing music. DoReMikko was one of the first video games designed for use with a musical instrument peripheral. Contemporary game releases, including the Famicom titles Otocky (オトッキー, Otokkī) (1987) and Instant Musician (いきなりミュージシャン, Ikinari Myūjishan) (1987), took all input from standard gamepads.

Konami went on to create a "Game Machine Division" devoted to music video games with input devices patterned after musical instruments, or involving dance-like movement. The Game Machine Division published its first title, Beatmania, in 1997.

== Gameplay ==
DoReMikko has three modes of play: Magic Forest (for keyboarding practice and game challenges), Piano (for musical improvisation and recording), and Concert (for multi-part arrangement, play, and recording).

=== Magic Forest ===
In the Magic Forest mode, the player can hear and learn to play the melodies of "Happy Birthday to You"; "Jingle Bells"; "Les Patineurs"; and a selection from the score of Gradius (1985), which was one of Konami's most popular titles at the time. Each of these selections is more technically difficult to play than the last. The game manual contains sheet music for the arrangement of each selection. In the Magic Forest mode, the player may choose from 14 virtual instruments, but cannot play more than one note at a time. To play piano chords, the player must switch to the Piano mode.

=== Piano and Concert ===
The Piano mode allows for improvisational play, but restricts the player to two options for the virtual instrument: piano or electric organ. An animated, concert-pianist avatar plays along with the player's improvisation. Like the Magic Forest mode, Concert mode gives the player access to the complete musical palette of 14 instruments. Unlike Magic Forest, it allows for arranging and performing multi-part music with up to six tracks, and a different instrument on each track. The on-screen avatars in this mode are a guitarist, electric bassist, and drummer on a concert stage.

The Piano and Concert modes each have a recording studio feature, which enables the player to save a performance as a data file to floppy disk. Compositions may have up to six tracks in Concert mode, or four tracks in Piano mode. The studio is a graphical interface designed to resemble a mixing desk and cassette deck. On the recording studio screen, each track is assigned an instrument, and the player can adjust the instrument's relative volume level using a fader. In Concert mode, one of the six track is reserved for bass, another for snare drum, and a third for drum kit. Through an additional fader, the player can enable a backing track, and choose a rhythm from a list of music genres: country, reggae, rock, et al.. In Piano mode, all four tracks are for piano or organ chords.

During performance, the keyboard inputs the melody, and the game controller functions as an effects unit: the A button bends the pitch, and the Up and Down buttons of the D-pad control an envelope generator. Since the 36-key keyboard can only play notes in a range of three octaves at a time, the D-pad's Left and Right buttons extend the range by shifting the notes of the keyboard one octave per press.

The four musical selections in the Magic Forest mode are not the only ones stored in the game. The recording studio screen offers an option to play back a rendition of the "Minute Waltz", as well as the DoReMikko theme music.

== See also ==
- List of Family Computer Disk System games
- List of Konami games
