= Gertrude's Secrets =

1984 video game

- Developer: The Learning Company
- Publisher: The Learning Company
- Platforms: Apple II, Commodore 64, MS-DOS
- Release: 1984
- Genre: Edutainment
- Mode: Single-player

Gertrude's Secrets is a 1984 children's educational video game by The Learning Company.

The goal is to solve puzzles and find secrets along with Gertrude the goose. The variety of puzzles involve basic recognition of shapes, colors, and patterns. The puzzles are designed to develop basic skills of logic and reasoning. A companion game, Gertrude's Puzzles was released at the same time. Gertrude's Secrets was released for MS-DOS, Commodore 64, and Apple II.

== Gameplay ==
Gertrude's Secrets features rooms filled with puzzles to be solved by arranging objects by shape and color. It is played by dragging Gertrude the Puzzle Bird into one of the various rooms. Gertrude then brings various shapes into the rooms which have to be arranged appropriately. Upon completion of the puzzle, Gertrude awards the player with a prize called a "treasure" which is stored in the player's treasure room. Puzzle types include "loop" and train puzzles.

== Reception ==
A review in the Journal of Learning Disabilities called the puzzles "challenging and highly entertaining" for children. The game was also cited as an example of a learning tool that can help children learn basic classification skills. Commodore Microcomputers stated that Gertrude's Secrets "is intuitive and easy for kids of all ages to understand". The magazine approved of its lack of "nerve-wracking time limits or invading aliens" and encouragement of "exploratory learning ... built on rock-solid educational principles". Leslie Eiser of Compute! commented that the game required involvement from a parent, being designed to challenge children in addition to teaching them.

== See also ==
- Gertrude's Puzzles
- Rocky's Boots
- Robot Odyssey
