= Classic NES Series =

Series of re-releases for the Game Boy Advance

- The Famicom Mini (left) and Classic NES Series (right) packaging of Super Mario Bros.
- Genre: Various
- Developer: Nintendo (Note: Specific entries were originally developed by Namco, Hudson Soft, Capcom, Konami, Bandai, and Banpresto.)
- Publisher: Nintendo
- Platform: Game Boy Advance
- First release: Super Mario Bros. February 14, 2004
- Latest release: Dai-2-Ji Super Robot Taisen; December 16, 2004

The Classic NES Series, known as the Famicom Mini (Note: Japanese: ファミコンミニ, Hepburn: Famikon Mini) series in Japan and the NES Classics series in Europe and Australia, is a line of emulated Nintendo Entertainment System and Famicom Disk System games, published by Nintendo for the Game Boy Advance (GBA) in 2004 to commemorate the NES's 20th anniversary. In Japan, the series was released in three "volumes" of ten games, plus two additional games available in limited quantities as raffle prizes. A smaller selection of these games were released in Western territories, split between two waves of releases. The series received mixed reviews, with critics praising how enjoyable most of the games remained to play after 20 years, but criticizing their high price point.

== Overview ==
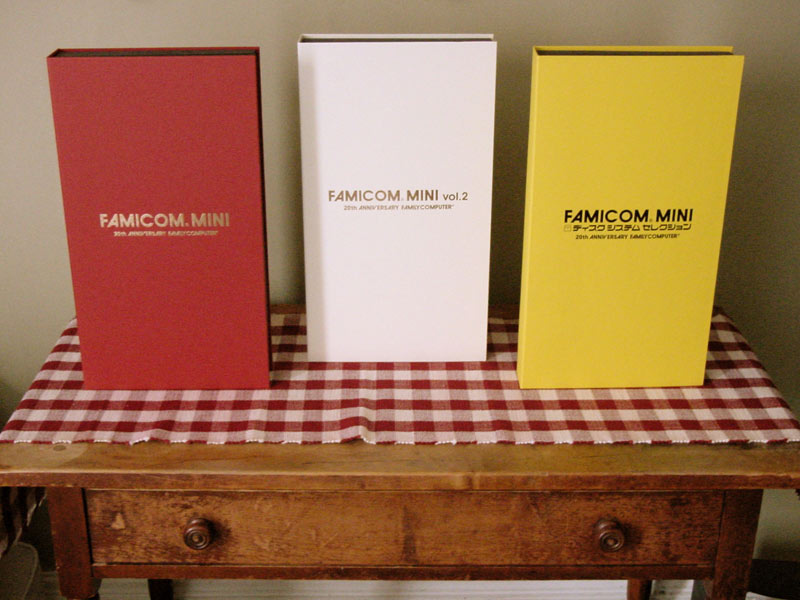
Three special collection boxes could be obtained from Club Nintendo by purchasing all of the Famicom Mini games.

The Family Computer, commonly shortened to Famicom, was Nintendo's first cartridge-based home video game console, originally released in Japan in 1983. The system would later be redesigned for Western markets as the Nintendo Entertainment System (NES), which was released in North America in 1985 and Europe in 1986. The Classic NES Series was developed to celebrate the collective 20th anniversary of these systems' launches. Each game was priced at ¥2,000 in Japan, US$20 in the United States, and £15 in the United Kingdom.

The Classic NES Series games run through emulation and are largely unchanged from their original releases, though some games have received minor modifications, such as an updated translation in The Legend of Zelda and a new autofire function in Xevious. Due to having to fit the GBA's lower screen resolution, the games are not displayed in their original aspect ratio, and have been modified to fill the screen. The emulator includes a sleep mode feature to temporarily suspend play. The games also allow data to be saved to the cartridge, such as high scores or game progress, a feature not present in many of the original Famicom and NES releases. Games with multiplayer functionality support single-cartridge multiplayer using the Game Link Cable or the Game Boy Advance Wireless Adapter.

In Japan, the Famicom Mini series was targeted at collectors. Games were individually numbered and sold in clear packaging with cartridge-sized cardboard sleeves that resembled miniature versions of the games' original Famicom box art. The cartridges in the first two volumes were colored red and white to match the Famicom console, while the cartridges in the third volume, dubbed the Disk System Selection, were colored yellow to match the Famicom Disk System's disks. The Famicom Mini games' availability was limited, with each volume's games being discontinued after three months. Members of the Japanese Club Nintendo rewards program could register the serial numbers for all ten games in each volume to receive a free collector's box in which to store them. In the West, the games used standard GBA packaging designed after their original NES box art, and were released on light gray cartridges based on the default color of NES cartridges.

A special edition Game Boy Advance SP in Famicom colors was released in Japan alongside the series, while Western regions received a system patterned to resemble a NES console and controller. A Game Boy Micro variant designed to resemble the Famicom controller was also available when the system launched in September 2005, commemorating the 20th anniversary of the Super Mario franchise; a reissue of Famicom Mini: Super Mario Bros. was released alongside it.

== List of games ==
A total of 32 games were released, only 12 of which saw distribution outside of Japan.

List of series entries
Title	Famicom Mini no.	JP release	NA release	PAL release	Note
Super Mario Bros.	1	February 14, 2004	June 7, 2004	July 9, 2004	—N/a
Donkey Kong	2	February 14, 2004	June 7, 2004	July 9, 2004	Also available on GBA via Animal Crossing download play and Nintendo e-Reader cards.
Ice Climber	3	February 14, 2004	June 7, 2004	July 9, 2004	Also available on GBA via Animal Crossing download play and Nintendo e-Reader cards.
Excitebike	4	February 14, 2004	June 7, 2004	July 9, 2004	Also available on GBA via Animal Crossing download play and Nintendo e-Reader cards.
The Legend of Zelda	5	February 14, 2004	June 7, 2004	July 9, 2004	—N/a
Pac-Man	6	February 14, 2004	June 7, 2004	July 9, 2004	Licensed by Namco. Also available on GBA via Pac-Man Collection and Namco Museum 50th Anniversary.
Xevious	7	February 14, 2004	June 7, 2004	July 9, 2004	Licensed by Namco.
Mappy	8	February 14, 2004	Unreleased	Unreleased	Licensed by Namco.
Bomberman	9	February 14, 2004	June 7, 2004	July 9, 2004	Licensed by Hudson Soft. Also available on GBA via Hudson Best Collection Vol 1: Bomberman Collection.
Star Soldier	10	February 14, 2004	Unreleased	Unreleased	Licensed by Hudson Soft. Also available on GBA via Hudson Best Collection Vol 5: Shooting Collection.
Mario Bros.	11	May 21, 2004	Unreleased	Unreleased	Also available on GBA via Animal Crossing download play, Nintendo e-Reader cards, the Super Mario Advance series, and Mario & Luigi: Superstar Saga.
Clu Clu Land	12	May 21, 2004	Unreleased	Unreleased	Also available on GBA via Animal Crossing download play and Nintendo e-Reader cards.
Balloon Fight	13	May 21, 2004	Unreleased	Unreleased	Also available on GBA via Animal Crossing download play and Nintendo e-Reader cards.
Wrecking Crew	14	May 21, 2004	Unreleased	Unreleased	—N/a
Dr. Mario	15	May 21, 2004	October 25, 2004	January 7, 2005	Also available on GBA via Nintendo Puzzle Collection download play.
Dig Dug	16	May 21, 2004	Unreleased	Unreleased	Licensed by Namco. Also available on GBA via Namco Museum and Namco Museum 50th Anniversary.
Takahashi Meijin no Bōken Jima	17	May 21, 2004	Unreleased	Unreleased	Licensed by Hudson Soft. Also available on GBA via Hudson Best Collection Vol 6: Bōken Jima Collection.
Makaimura	18	May 21, 2004	Unreleased	Unreleased	Licensed by Capcom.
TwinBee	19	May 21, 2004	Unreleased	Unreleased	Licensed by Konami.
Ganbare Goemon! Karakuri Dōchū	20	May 21, 2004	Unreleased	Unreleased	Licensed by Konami.
Super Mario Bros. 2	21	August 10, 2004	Unreleased	Unreleased	—N/a
Nazo no Murasame Jō	22	August 10, 2004	Unreleased	Unreleased	—N/a
Metroid	23	August 10, 2004	October 25, 2004	January 7, 2005	Also available on GBA via Metroid: Zero Mission.
Hikari Shinwa - Palutena no Kagami	24	August 10, 2004	Unreleased	Unreleased	—N/a
Zelda II: The Adventure of Link	25	August 10, 2004	October 25, 2004	January 7, 2005	—N/a
Shin Onigashima	26	August 10, 2004	Unreleased	Unreleased	—N/a
Famicom Tantei Club: Kieta Kōkeisha	27	August 10, 2004	Unreleased	Unreleased	—N/a
Famicom Tantei Club Part II: Ushiro ni Tatsu Shōjo	28	August 10, 2004	Unreleased	Unreleased	—N/a
Castlevania	29	August 10, 2004	October 25, 2004	January 7, 2005	Licensed by Konami.
SD Gundam World: Gachapon Senshi - Scramble Wars	30	August 10, 2004	Unreleased	Unreleased	Licensed by Bandai.
Mobile Suit Z Gundam: Hot Scramble	—N/a	March 18, 2004	Unreleased	Unreleased	Licensed by Bandai. Only 2000 copies were printed as raffle prizes for purchasers of Kidō Senshi Gundam: Senshitachi no Kiseki.
Dai-2-Ji Super Robot Taisen	—N/a	December 16, 2004	Unreleased	Unreleased	Licensed by Banpresto. Only 2000 copies were printed as raffle prizes for purchasers of Super Robot Wars GC.

== Reception ==
Upon launch of the Famicom Mini series in Japan, one million units were sold within eight days. The re-release of Super Mario Bros. went on to become the 13th best selling Game Boy Advance game, selling over 2.2 million copies.

The Classic NES Series garnered mixed critical reception. While most reviewers found that the games were still enjoyable to play, the cost was a common point of criticism. Many believed that the price for a single game compared unfavorably to that of contemporary video game compilations, which often featured multiple games from the same era. Craig Harris of IGN noted that several of the available games were already playable on the Game Boy Advance in less expensive formats, such as via cards for the Nintendo e-Reader and as unlockables in Animal Crossing. Harris thought the Famicom Mini version of Mario Bros. was especially egregious, as the game had already been re-released on GBA seven other times. Metroid's inclusion in the series was considered redundant by Bob Colayco of GameSpot, since it was already included as an unlockable extra in its GBA remake, Metroid: Zero Mission. Both GameSpot and IGN noted that Nintendo had recently given away The Legend of Zelda and Zelda II: The Adventure of Link for free in the Legend of Zelda: Collector's Edition bonus disc for GameCube, although they conceded that the Classic NES Series versions were portable. Reviewers generally believed that while some games like Super Mario Bros., The Legend of Zelda, and Castlevania were potentially worth their asking price, others like Ice Climber, Donkey Kong, and Dr. Mario did not offer enough gameplay to justify the high cost of the cartridge.

Some critics were annoyed by the games' altered screen ratio, which caused odd graphical artifacts. Reviewers additionally noted that because the games were based on their NES releases, some games were missing features present in other versions. Jeff Gerstmann of GameSpot said of Bomberman that "a Bomberman game without multiplayer is hardly a Bomberman game at all." Similarly, reviewers lamented a missing level in Donkey Kong, which was present in its original arcade version but removed from the NES release. Harris also felt that the new autofire function in Xevious removed much of the game's challenge.
