= Pachicom =

1985 video game

- Cover art (MSX)
- Developers: Shouei System; Bear's (Famicom & FDS)
- Publisher: Toemiland
- Platforms: MSX; Family Computer; PC-88; Famicom Disk System
- Release: MSX: JP: 1985; Family Computer: JP: November 21, 1985; PC-88: JP: 1987; Famicom Disk System: JP: October 4, 1988
- Genre: Parlor game (Gambling)
- Modes: Single-player; Multiplayer

Pachicom (パチコン, Pachikon) is a parlor video game released for multiple platforms that is themed around pachinko. It was released in 1985 exclusively to the Japanese market.

The game of pachinko is hugely popular in Japan, since it involves playing pinball with an element of slot machines mixed in along with gambling. There are four different gameplay modes to choose from (two of them assign a player with a pachinko machine while the other two allow players to choose their own machine).

== Gameplay ==
Sample game of Pachicom (Family Computer) in progress. Notice that text on the screen is entirely in English.

The game is based on standard pachinko rules, replicating the experience of playing pachinko in a parlor. The game board has a layout with nails sticking out. Metal balls would either of or fall in between the holes created by the pegs in order to traverse the board. Certain compartments are added to the board. Should a metal ball find its way to one of these compartments, the player will receive points that are similar to credits on a slot machine. Players can expect to lose that ball (and a point) if it falls below the bottom of the board (similar to falling down a bottomless pit in an action game). Initially, the player starts off with one hundred balls (points).

In Mode A, the clock goes forward from 000000 seconds until it reaches 999999 seconds (the equivalent of either 16666.65 non-real time minutes, 2777.775 non-real time hours, or 115.740625 non-real time days). Once that occurs, the game is over and any remaining points are stored in the top three score list. Mode B is the same except that the clock goes backwards from 999999 seconds all the way back to 000000 seconds. It is very easy to mash the "A" button repeatedly around with the direction pad to the right in order to accumulate mass winnings from the pachinko games and "cheat" the system.

== Hidden messages ==
There is a hidden message in the Famicom version that can be found in any hex editor. Almost five percent of the entire ROM (2.05 kilobytes out of the 41 kilobyte ROM image) is taken up by this otherwise inaccessible message. The message, written in romaji, features a lengthy rant towards the game's executives, harshly criticizing them for forcing changes on the fly, particularly the sound effects and even showing how to replace them with the initially intended sounds. A much shorter rant, presumably written by the same person and also in romaji and accessed via a hex editor, was included in the MSX release.
