= Yūyūki =

1989 video game

- Disk 1 (left) and Disk 2 (right)
- Developers: Nintendo R&D4; Pax Softnica
- Publisher: Nintendo
- Director: Tatsuya Hishida
- Producer: Shigeru Miyamoto
- Programmers: Tomoshige Hashishita; Taisuke Araki; Hitoshi Kodama
- Artists: Tatsuya Hishida; Yoichi Kotabe
- Writers: Tatsuya Hishida; Keiji Terui
- Composer: Soyo Oka
- Release: Disk 1; JP: October 14, 1989; Disk 2; JP: November 14, 1989
- Genre: Adventure
- Mode: Single-player

Famicom Mukashibanashi: Yūyūki (ふぁみこんむかし話 遊遊記, Famicom Fairytales: Yuyuki), often simply titled as Yūyūki (遊遊記), is a 1989 text-based adventure game developed by Nintendo R&D4 and Pax Softnica. It was released by Nintendo on two disk cards for the Famicom Disk System. Yūyūki is the second in the Famicom Mukashibanashi series after Shin Onigashima (1987). The game is loosely based on the Chinese novel Journey to the West.

== Gameplay ==
Yuyuki is an adventure game played by choosing from several text commands shown on screen. It resembles its predecessor, Shin Onigashima, in its implementation of the "Change Character" command, usage of traditional Japanese fairytales, and general screen layout and appearance. The story-line is a parody of the Chinese novel Journey to the West, where two main characters, Goku and Chao, embark upon separate journeys to find one another.

In Yuyuki, the "Change Character" command can switch between a maximum of five different characters. However, there are very few points in the game where it can actually be used to such extent. Its main use is to switch between Goku and the others accompanying him. Like Shin Onigashima, the character in use can greatly affect the descriptive text shown on screen, and the significant increase in number of characters allowed for more variety in each scene. It is possible to enjoy the game by viewing the reactions towards choosing completely unrelated characters or commands in certain situations.

While Shin Onigashima demanded rather complex puzzle-solving abilities, Yuyuki mainly focuses on having the player carefully read and understand the story-line. Puzzles are solved easily in this game, and very few choices actually lead to a "game over" screen. Easy trivia questions and simple action gameplay emerge at certain points, and players may find themselves searching for the obvious answer on screen more often than thinking hard to solve the puzzle at hand.

Main changes in gameplay from Shin Onigashima include the implementation of the "Ittaisan" command, which saves progress at any point during the game, and faster animation of game text. The shortening in load time after choosing commands, and an overall decrease in difficulty allowed Yuyuki to run at a much quicker tempo than its predecessor.

Screenshot of gameplay

== Plot ==
Once upon a time, a little girl named Chao lived in a small village in China. One night, a meteor fell near Chao's home, which burst open to reveal a monkey inside. Chao named the monkey "Goku" and took care of him for a while. However, Goku is led away and imprisoned by Oshakasama for the various crimes he has committed, and Chao sets off to find the "Gavel of Light" in order to save him. Several years later, the world is put under peril at the hands of the bull-monster Gyumaou, and Goku is called upon to save the world.

=== Characters ===
The links labelled "see also" are articles for each character in Journey to the West. Descriptions given here may differ significantly with that of the actual novel.

The player has the option of choosing different names for Goku and Chao at the start of the game. The "Change Character" command can be used with the first five characters listed below.

Goku
The hero of the game. Rough, rude, and often selfish, he attempted to take over heaven with Gyumaou but was caught and exiled to a far corner of the world by Oshakasama. He learns the importance of kindness and diligence through his travels with Chao (see also: Sun Wukong).
Chao
The heroine of the game. She enjoys reading romance novels and often dreams of idealized love relationships. Her parents have already died, and she begins her journey to save Goku; her only remaining "family" member. She is an innocent and kind-hearted individual. She is an original character, replacing Yulong as the fifth protagonist.
Sanzo
A lecherous, lazy, and unhygienic monk. He travels to Tenjiku in search of a scroll containing the "Philosophy of Enjoying Life Without Working". He rides on a scooter named "Ryukichi", and has a habit of adding "-Nandana" to the end of his sentences (see also: Tang Sanzang).
Hakkai
A greedy pig youkai with a never-ending appetite. He speaks in Kansai dialect, and has transformation and clairvoyance abilities. He was a petty criminal before being beaten up by Goku. Like Sanzo, he joins the journey to discover the "Philosophy of Enjoying Life Without Working" (see also: Zhu Bajie).
Gojo
A kappa capable of reading minds. He joins the group because he is dissatisfied with his current life. He exhibits a discreet personality most of the time but is actually an alcoholic (see also: Sha Wujing).
Gyumaou
A cold and ruthless bull youkai bent upon taking over the entire world. He was banished from the Earth ages ago along with Goku but managed to return and restart his evil plans.
Oshakasama
The peacekeeper of the heavens. Appears on occasion to give advice to Chao and Sanzo on keeping Goku on the righteous path and defeating Gyumaou (see also: Guanyin).
Rasetsujo
Gyumaou's wife. Rumoured to be extremely beautiful, but her actual features are horrifically ugly. She wields a fan with magical properties (see also: Princess Iron Fan).
Kougaiji
The son of Gyumaou and Rasetsujo, he is arrogant and big-mouthed, but pathetically weak in terms of fighting ability (see also: Red Boy).
Kinkaku & Ginkaku
A pair of thugs that terrorize Onna Village. They are employed by Gyumaou and lure potential victims into participating in their trivia contest.
Kumojijii (Cloud Geezer)
A master of martial arts living on Borscht Mountain in Siberia, he is old over 300 years of age.
Katyusha
Kumojijii's girlfriend. Kidnapped by Gyumaou and his cronies.
Sunajijii (Sand Geezer)
The younger brother of Kumojijii living in Hawaii, spends most of his life living underneath the sand.
Gyudon store owner
The owner of a gyūdon store located on the Hawaiian beach. His daughter is kidnapped by Rasetsujo.
Gyudon store owner's daughter
The kidnapped daughter of the gyudon store owner. She is imprisoned in the Gyumaou Hotel.
Dancing people
A deranged group of people dancing in the streets of Tokyo.
Ittaisan
The game's narrator and an only returning character from Shin Onigashima.

== Television commercial ==
An odd commercial for the game was aired prior to its release, featuring real-life versions of the main characters (all wearing sunglasses) visiting various locations by plane in a "Tenjiku Tour" (Tenjiku is the final destination in Journey to the West, located in India) such as Japan, Hawaii and Siberia. The most striking part was the commercial's jingle; the developers employed a strange song of no particular meaning that chanted the names of the main characters. This was the last Disk System game advertised on television.

== Port issues ==
While Shin Onigashima was ported to the Super Famicom and Game Boy Advance, no talk of porting or remaking Yuyuki for other systems has ever emerged. The explanation given was that the game lacked proper copyright clearance from developers and writers, but this explanation is dubious because Shin Onigashima was created by the same company and staff. The Disk System's rewriting service ended in September 2003, but rewriting for Yuyuki was terminated a year earlier in October 2002.

== Legacy ==
Goku and Chao made cameo appearances in the Kirby's Dream Land series. The appearances do not add to the game's storyline, but they play key roles in finishing each game:

- Chao appears in the Japanese version of Kirby's Dream Land 2, which was released in 1995 (in international versions, Chao is replaced by a female version of Gooey). The player's progress is shown in percentage on the menu screen in this game, and the only way to reach 100% is to find Chao, who randomly appears in one of the bags that usually contains Rick, Coo, Kine, or Gooey. The picture shown on the sound test screen is a parody of a scene in Yuyuki.
- Both Goku and Chao appear in Kirby's Dream Land 3, released in 1997. Finding Goku in a cave and reuniting him with Chao on a certain level awards the player one of the Heart Stars needed to defeat the final boss of the game.
- A remix of most of the songs from the series shows up as a medley in Super Smash Bros. Ultimate, released in 2018. Goku and Chao also appear as "Spirits" power-ups in the game.

Makoto Asada, a video game producer at 5pb., has expressed interest in making a remake of Yūyūki.

== See also ==
- Shin Onigashima
- Time Twist: Rekishi no Katasumi de...
- Famicom Bunko: Hajimari no Mori
