= Shin Onigashima =

1987 video game

- Disk 1 packaging artwork (left) and disk 2 packaging artwork (right)
- Developers: Nintendo R&D4; Pax Softnica
- Publisher: Nintendo
- Director: Tatsuya Hishida
- Producer: Shigeru Miyamoto
- Designers: Kazunobu Shimizu; Yoshitaka Nishikawa
- Programmers: Tomoshige Hashishita; Masayuki Kameyama
- Writer: Tatsuya Hishida
- Composer: Koji Kondo
- Platforms: Famicom Disk System, Game Boy Advance
- Release: Famicom Disk System; Disk 1: JP: September 4, 1987; Disk 2: JP: September 30, 1987; Game Boy Advance: JP: August 4, 2004
- Genre: Adventure
- Mode: Single Player

Shin Onigashima is a 1987 adventure game developed by Nintendo R&D4 and Pax Softnica. It was released by Nintendo on two disk cards for the Famicom Disk System. Shin Onigashima was produced by Shigeru Miyamoto with music by Koji Kondo. The game is the first in the Famicom Mukashibanashi series and was followed by Yūyūki (1989).

== Gameplay ==
Donbe (left) and Hikari (right) in Shin Onigashima

The game is played by selecting commands which make the characters talk to, use, or examine various objects or characters. Progress is marked by changes in the illustrative image in the top-right corner of the screen. One of the most distinctive features of the game is the "Change Character" command, used to switch between the two main characters (Donbe, the boy, and Hikari, the girl). The characters can move through the story separately at times, and may be called upon to do tasks that the other main character cannot accomplish on their own. The use of this command in certain situations can trigger dialogue particular to each character, bringing out the peculiarities of each. This is essentially a form of zapping, but a similar command was implemented in the 1995 visual novel EVE Burst Error.

The game also utilizes the Disk System's feature of being able to exchange game disks while the device is powered on. The game is divided into two disks, and the player must exchange disks while the Disk System is still powered on in order to activate the second disk (note: Disk 2 is not playable without the first). This format was also used in the game's sequel Yūyūki and the Famicom Detective Club series.

== Plot ==
Once upon a time, there was an elderly couple living in Nagakushi village, a small village located far up in the mountains. The couple had no children, until one day, they were entrusted with the care of an infant boy and girl, as prophesied in a dream. The years went by, and when the two children were 8 years old, there was a terrible occurrence in the western capital. A dragon suddenly appeared in the city, turning humans into oni, ogres that suck away the souls of other humans. The oni advanced as far as Nagakushi village, stealing away the souls of the elderly couple. Fortunately the two children were left unharmed, and they set out on a quest to save their adopted parents, not realizing that this adventure would reveal the secret of their true origins...

== Development ==
Shin Onigashima borrows heavily from traditional Japanese fairytales such as Momotarō and Princess Kaguya. Most text-based adventure games of the time were written in the style of mystery novels, where the player had to solve a murder or crime of some sort, but Shin Onigashima's fairytale-like plot gave a much softer and accessible feel to the genre.

A conversion of the game was included as part of Heisei Shin Onigashima, released for the Super Famicom in 1997 and 1998. It was also redone for the Game Boy Advance as part of the Famicom Mini series on August 4, 2004. The Virtual Console release came on June 19, 2007. The game was never released outside Japan.

== Reception ==
The game's difficulty is rather high, as very few hints are given in solving mysteries, and many circumstances can lead to the "game over" screen. Even so, the game's warm graphics and plot consisting of numerous interwoven Japanese fairytales was positively received by fans and critics alike. The in-game music, written by Koji Kondo, is regarded in equally high esteem, and the game is considered a success as Nintendo's first text-based adventure game.

The 1989 "All Soft Catalog" issue of Famicom Tsūshin (now Famitsu) included Shin Onigashima in its list of the best games of all time. In particular, they gave it the award for the best "Adventure" game of all time. In 2013, IGN noted similarities to later adventure games such as Famicom Tantei Club, Nakayama Miho no Tokimeki High School, 999: Nine Hours, Nine Persons, Nine Doors, and Zero Escape: Virtue's Last Reward.

== Super Famicom release ==
Heisei Shin Onigashima
- Developer: Pax Softnica
- Publisher: Nintendo
- Platforms: Super Famicom, Nintendo Power, Satellaview, Wii (Virtual Console), Wii U (Virtual Console)
- Release: December 1997: Nintendo Power; JP: December 1, 1997 Super Famicom; JP: May 23, 1998 Wii Virtual Console Part 1; JP: May 25, 2010 Part 2; JP: June 1, 2010 Wii U Virtual Console; JP: September 24, 2014
- Genre: Adventure
- Mode: Single-player

Nine years after the release of the Disk System version, BS Shin Onigashima (BS新・鬼ヶ島) was released on September 29, 1996, for the Super Famicom's Satellaview unit. The game was broadcast via the St.GIGA BS Satellite, and was downloadable within the BS-X menu from the Broadcast Clubhouse (語り部の小屋, Katari bu no Koya). BS Shin Onigashima takes its plot from the original version of the game, but is mostly presented from the viewpoint of the three helpers who join the protagonists during the game (the dog, monkey and pheasant). In-game music was transmitted via radio, and Ittaisan, the game's narrator, appears in-between chapters to sum up the storyline via SoundLink. The character of Ittaisan was voiced by Ichirō Nagai. The Satellaview version was well received by fans.

The Super Famicom version uses the same command menu gameplay implemented in the Disk System version, but the "Change Character" command was not included due to time constraints. Satellaview games were only broadcast during a limited time period, and using the command would complicate the game to an unnecessary degree. New tweaks by the developers were to include platform-style action scenes, and to set time limits for choosing certain commands.

On December 1, 1997, BS Shin Onigashima was redone for a commercial release on the Nintendo Power, as Heisei Shin Onigashima (平成 新・鬼ヶ島; lit. "Heisei Era: New Island of Ogres") with the original Disk System game included as a bonus. Its popularity prompted a cartridge release on May 23, 1998. This version was also released in two cartridges, but unlike the Disk System release, it is possible to play the second cartridge without having finished the first one.

=== Changes ===
The Satellaview broadcast was divided into four chapters, and in the Super Famicom release, the first two chapters make up the first disk, and the latter two make up the second. "Jizo Ittaisan" are placed throughout the game, which allow the player to save. There are no time limits for choosing commands, and a golden buddha statue in the likeness of Mario appears in the first chapter.

The original Disk System version is unlocked after all four chapters are completed. This was not a complete port of the original, as several changes were made to the text and in-game music. An opening demo of Donbe and Kintaro in a sumo match is added, and colors appear darker than the original.

== Game Boy Advance version ==
Famicom Mukashibanashi: Shin Onigashima was released for the Game Boy Advance on August 10, 2004 as part of the Famicom Mini: Disk System Selection series. Unlike the previous installations, the GBA version does not require changing between disks; the entire game is played on one cartridge. The game itself saw no major changes, but on-screen menus were fixed to accommodate the GBA. Load and save times were eliminated by the use of the faster cartridge, allowing the game to run without breaks.

== See also ==
- Yūyūki
- Time Twist: Rekishi no Katasumi de...
