= 2nd Super Robot Wars =

1991 video game

- Family Computer box art
- Developer: Winkysoft
- Publishers: Banpresto; Nintendo (GBA)
- Series: Super Robot Wars
- Platforms: Famicom; Game Boy; PlayStation; Game Boy Advance
- Release: Famicom: JP: December 29, 1991; Game Boy: JP: June 30, 1995; PlayStation: JP: June 10, 1999 (Complete Box); JP: December 2, 1999 (Separate release); Game Boy Advance: JP: December 16, 2004
- Genre: Tactical role-playing
- Mode: Single player

2nd Super Robot Wars (第2次スーパーロボット大戦, Dai-2-Ji Super Robot Taisen) is a tactical role-playing video game developed by Winkysoft and published by Banpresto for the Famicom. It was the first game to be produced in the "Classic" canon timeline, the second game in the overall series, and the first (and only) game produced for the Famicom video game system on December 29, 1991.

A remake of the 2nd Super Robot Wars was ported to Game Boy on June 30, 1995, under 2nd Super Robot Wars G (第2次スーパーロボット大戦G). However, it was not part of the "Classic" canon to the timeline. 2nd Super Robot Wars was ported to Sony PlayStation on June 10, 1999, as part of the Super Robot Wars Complete Box then separately on December 2, 1999. It was released for Game Boy Advance as an exclusive Famicom Mini game, available only as a raffle prize with the purchase of Super Robot Wars GC. The PSX version was digitally released on January 26, 2011 on the PlayStation Network.

== Story ==
You must stop Bian Zoldark and the Divine Crusaders all while fighting the familiar foes from various robot anime that make up DC's ranks like Char Aznable from Mobile Suit Gundam and Baron Ashura from Mazinger Z.

== Featured Series ==
- Mazinger Z
- Great Mazinger
- Grendizer (debut)
- Getter Robo
- Getter Robo G
- Mobile Suit Gundam
- Mobile Suit Zeta Gundam
- Mobile Suit Gundam ZZ
- Mobile Suit Gundam: Char's Counterattack
- Mobile Suit Gundam F91
- Mobile Suit Victory Gundam (debut in Game Boy version)
- Mobile Fighter G Gundam (debut in Game Boy version)
- Banpresto Originals (original characters created for the game; debut)

== New features ==
- Original characters and robots made by Banpresto were introduced in this game. Unlike the other characters, they are not licensed from other series and usually referred to as Banpresto Originals by fans. The Super Robot Taisen: Original Generation series is composed entirely of these characters and robots.
- The first game merely featured the robots, which were regarded as sentient. This game includes the pilots from the robots respective series.
- This was the first game in the canon to have an actual story. The first game had barely anything resembling a plotline aside from an opening demo sequence, whereas this game now includes character intermissions between battle maps.
- Certain enemy characters can be induced to defect to the player's side, though unlike the first game, not every one can be induced to defect.
- An ingame shop exists that allows the player to use money (earned by destroying enemy robots) to buy upgrades for the robots, a concept that would be revisited in Super Robot Wars Alpha Gaiden and Super Robot Wars Z.

== Reception ==
On release, Famicom Tsūshin scored the Game Boy version of the game (entitled 2nd Super Robot Wars G) a 28 out of 40.
