= List of Famicom Disk System games =

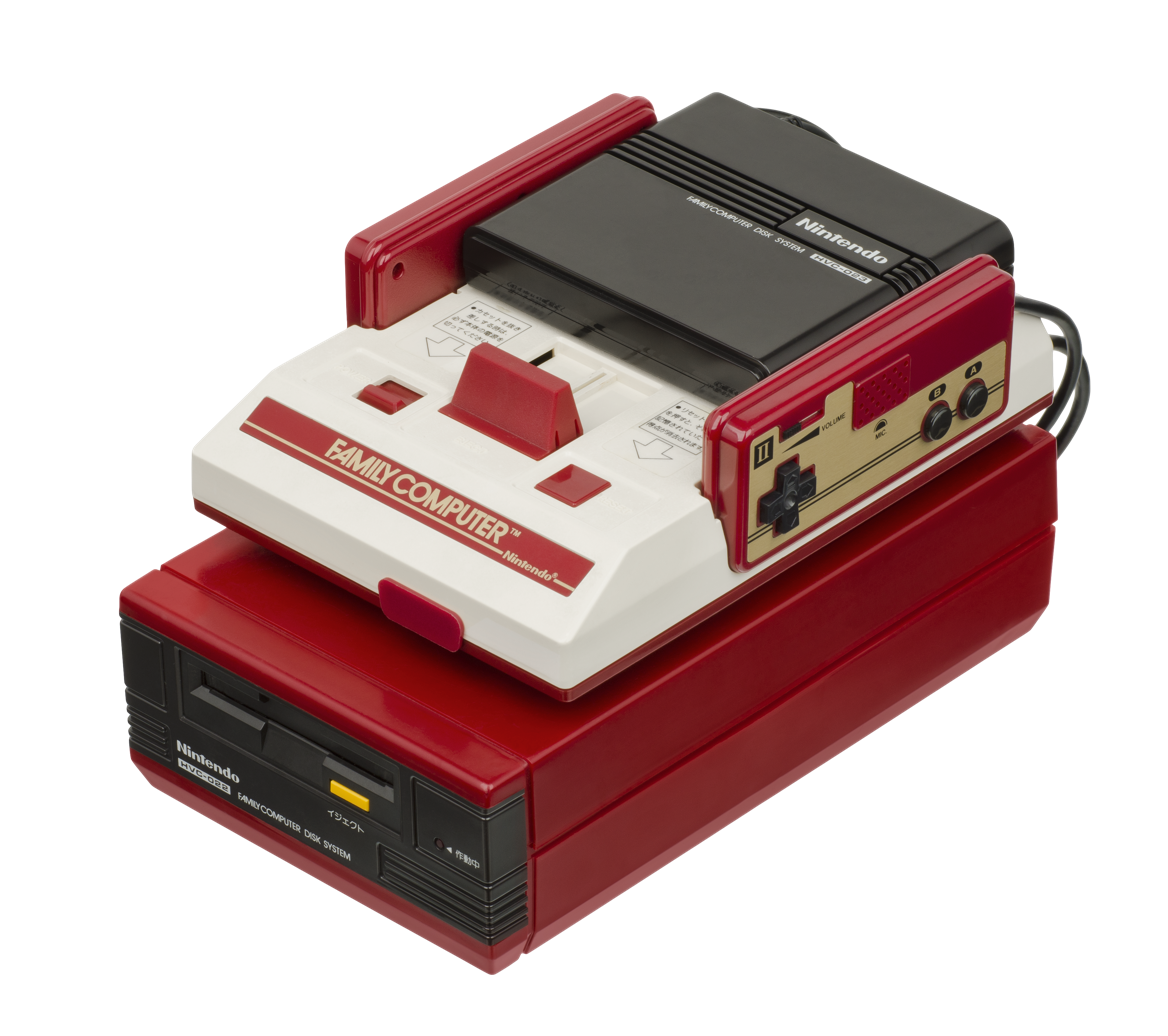
Famicom Disk System disk drive and RAM adapter attached to the Famicom console

The Family Computer Disk System (Famicom Disk System) add-on for the Family Computer has a library of 194 (Note: This number is always up to date by this script.) officially licensed games during its initial lifespan, 138 of which were not released on the standard Famicom or NES cartridge format plus 6 additional part 2 disks that served as an extension to previously released part 1 disks. Of these, 148 were released exclusively in Japan, and 46 would be released internationally for the Nintendo Entertainment System in some form. Cartridge games for the Famicom and NES are in the list of Nintendo Entertainment System games.

== Games ==
Title	Developer(s)	Publisher(s)	Release date	Notes
19: Neunzehn	Soft Pro International	Soft Pro International	March 4, 1988	
Adian no Tsue	ASK Kodansha	Sunsoft	December 12, 1986	
Ai Senshi Nicol	Konami	Konami	April 24, 1987	
Akumajō Dracula	Konami	Konami	September 26, 1986	Released in 1987 as a cartridge for the NES as Castlevania and then rereleased on a cartridge for the Famicom in 1993.
Akū Senki Raijin	Microcabin	Square	July 12, 1988	Only available through Disk Writer kiosks.
All Night Nippon Super Mario Bros.	Nintendo R&D4	Fuji TV	December 20, 1986	Contest prize from the Japanese radio program All Night Nippon.
All 1	Tokuma Shoten	Tokuma Shoten	February 22, 1991	Famimaga Disk Vol. 3, Only available through Disk Writer kiosks.
Apple Town Story	Square	Square	April 3, 1987	
Arumana no Kiseki	Konami	Konami	August 11, 1987	
Aspic: Majaou no Noroi	XTALSOFT	Bothtec	March 31, 1988	
Backgammon	Intelligent Systems	Nintendo	September 7, 1990	
Bakutōshi Patton-Kun	Soft Pro International	Soft Pro International	August 5, 1988	
Baseball	Nintendo R&D1	Nintendo	February 21, 1986	Originally released as a cartridge for the Famicom and NES.
Big Challenge! Dogfight Spirit	Jaleco	Jaleco	October 21, 1988	
Big Challenge! Go! Go! Bowling	Jaleco	Jaleco	June 23, 1989	
Big Challenge! Gun Fighter	Jaleco	Jaleco	March 28, 1989	
Big Challenge! Judo Senshuken	Jaleco	Jaleco	August 10, 1988	
Bio Miracle Bokutte Upa	Konami	Konami	April 22, 1988	Later released as a cartridge for the Famicom.
Bomberman	Hudson Soft	Hudson Soft	April 24, 1990	Only available through Disk Writer kiosks. Originally released as a cartridge for the Famicom and NES.
Breeder	Soft Pro International	Soft Pro International	December 15, 1986	
Bubble Bobble	Taito	Taito	October 30, 1987	Released in pencil-pouch case. Later released as a cartridge for the NES.
BurgerTime	Data East; Sakata SAS	Data East	September 23, 1988	Only available through Disk Writer kiosks. Originally released as a cartridge for the Famicom and NES.
Chitei Tairiku Orudoora	ASK Kodansha	Sunsoft	March 27, 1987	
Cleopatra no Mahō	Square	Square	July 24, 1987	
Clocks	Tokuma Shoten	Tokuma Shoten	April 19, 1991	Famimaga Disk Vol. 4, Only available through Disk Writer kiosks.
Clu Clu Land: Welcome to New Clu Clu Land	Nintendo R&D1	Nintendo	April 28, 1992	Only available through Disk Writer kiosks. A conversion of VS. Clu Clu Land, and originally a cartridge for the Famicom and NES.
Cocona World	SOFEL	SOFEL	April 10, 1987	
Dandy: Zeuon No Fukkatsu	Atelier Double	Pony Canyon	October 21, 1988	
Dead Zone	Sunsoft	Sunsoft	November 20, 1986	
Deep Dungeon: Madō Senki	HummingBirdSoft	Square	December 19, 1986	
Dig Dug	Namco	Namco	July 20, 1990	Only available through Disk Writer kiosks. Originally released as a cartridge for the Famicom.
Dig Dug II	Namco	Namco	August 31, 1990	Only available through Disk Writer kiosks. Originally released as a cartridge for the Famicom and NES.
Dirty Pair: Project Eden	Daiei Seisakusho	Bandai	March 28, 1987	
Donkey Kong	Nintendo R&D2	Nintendo	April 8, 1988	Only available through Disk Writer kiosks. Originally released in 1983 as a cartridge for the Famicom, and then in 1986 for NES.
Donkey Kong Jr.	Nintendo R&D2	Nintendo	July 19, 1988	Only available through Disk Writer kiosks. Originally released in 1983 as a cartridge for the Famicom, and then in 1986 for NES.
Doremikko	Konami	Konami	December 4, 1987	
Dr. Chaos: Jigoku no Tobira	Marionette; SRS	Pony Canyon	June 19, 1987	Later released as a cartridge for the NES.
Dracula II: Noroi no Fūin	Konami	Konami	August 28, 1987	Later released as a cartridge for the NES as Castlevania II: Simon's Quest.
Druid: Kyōfu no Tobira	Jaleco	Jaleco	March 3, 1988	
Eggerland	HAL Laboratory	HAL Laboratory	January 29, 1987	
Eggerland: Sōzō e no Tabidachi	HAL Laboratory	HAL Laboratory	August 20, 1988	Only available through Disk Writer kiosks.
Electrician	Kemco	Kemco	December 26, 1986	
Esper Dream	Konami	Konami	February 20, 1987	
Exciting Baseball	Konami	Konami	December 8, 1987	
Exciting Basket	Konami	Konami	July 24, 1987	Later released as a cartridge for the NES as Double Dribble.
Exciting Billiard	Konami	Konami	June 26, 1987	
Exciting Soccer: Konami Cup	Konami	Konami	February 16, 1988	
Fairytale	Soft Pro International	Soft Pro International	April 28, 1989	
Falsion	Konami	Konami	October 21, 1987	Compatible with the Famicom 3D System peripheral.
Famicom Grand Prix: F-1 Race	Nintendo R&D4	Nintendo	October 30, 1987	Released on a blue disk.
Famicom Grand Prix II: 3D Hot Rally	Nintendo R&D4; HAL Laboratory	Nintendo	April 14, 1988	Released on a blue disk.
Famicom Mukashibanashi: Shin Onigashima - Zenpen	Nintendo R&D4; Pax Softnica	Nintendo	September 4, 1987	Also commonly known as simply Shin Onigashima Disk 1.
Famicom Mukashibanashi: Shin Onigashima - Kōhen	Nintendo R&D4; Pax Softnica	Nintendo	September 30, 1987	Also commonly known as simply Shin Onigashima Disk 2.
Famicom Mukashibanashi: Yūyūki - Zenpen	Nintendo R&D4; Pax Softnica	Nintendo	October 14, 1989	Also commonly known as simply Yūyūki Disk 1.
Famicom Mukashibanashi: Yūyūki - Kōhen	Nintendo R&D4; Pax Softnica	Nintendo	November 14, 1989	Also commonly known as simply Yūyūki Disk 2.
Famicom Tantei Club: Kieta Kōkeisha - Zenpen	Nintendo R&D1; Tose	Nintendo	April 27, 1988	Also commonly known in English as Famicom Detective Club: The Missing Heir Disk 1.
Famicom Tantei Club: Kieta Kōkeisha - Kōhen	Nintendo R&D1; Tose	Nintendo	June 14, 1988	Also commonly known in English as Famicom Detective Club: The Missing Heir Disk 2.
Famicom Tantei Club Part II: Ushiro ni Tatsu Shōjo - Zenpen	Nintendo R&D1; Tose	Nintendo	May 23, 1989	Also commonly known in English as Famicom Detective Club: The Girl Who Stands Behind Disk 1.
Famicom Tantei Club Part II: Ushiro ni Tatsu Shōjo - Kōhen	Nintendo R&D1; Tose	Nintendo	June 30, 1989	Also commonly known in English as Famicom Detective Club: The Girl Who Stands Behind Disk 2.
Family Composer	Musical Plan	Tokyo Shoseki	October 30, 1987	
Final Command: Akai Yōsai	Konami	Konami	May 2, 1988	Later released as a cartridge for the NES.
Fire Bam	HAL Laboratory; Live Planning	HAL Laboratory	February 1, 1988	
Fire Rock	System Sacom	Use Corporation	June 20, 1988	
Fūun Shōrin Ken	Jaleco	Jaleco	April 17, 1987	
Fūun Shōrin Ken: Ankoku no Maō	Jaleco	Jaleco	April 22, 1988	
Galaga	Namco	Namco	June 22, 1990	Only available through Disk Writer kiosks. Originally released as a cartridge for the Famicom and NES.
Galaxian	Namco	Namco	July 20, 1990	Only available through Disk Writer kiosks. Originally released as a cartridge for the Famicom.
Gall Force: Eternal Story	HAL Laboratory	HAL Laboratory	November 19, 1986	
Ginga Denshō: Galaxy Odyssey	Atlus	Imagineer	November 6, 1986	Released as a part of the WaveJack series in special packaging with an included audio cassette.
Gokuraku Yūgi: Game Tengoku	SOFEL	SOFEL	December 12, 1987	
Golf	Nintendo R&D2; HAL Laboratory	Nintendo	February 21, 1986	Originally released as a cartridge for the Famicom and NES.
Golf Japan Course	Nintendo R&D2; HAL Laboratory	Nintendo	February 21, 1987	Released on a blue disk.
Golf U.S Course	Nintendo R&D2; HAL Laboratory	Nintendo	June 14, 1987	Released on a blue disk.
The Goonies	Konami	Konami	April 8, 1988	Only available through Disk Writer kiosks. Originally released as a cartridge for the Famicom.
Green Beret	Konami	Konami	April 10, 1987	Later released as a cartridge for the NES as Rush'n Attack.
Gun.Smoke	Capcom	Capcom	January 27, 1988	Later released as a cartridge for the NES.
Gyruss	Konami	Konami	November 18, 1988	Later released as a cartridge for the NES.
Halley Wars	ITL	Taito	January 14, 1989	
Hao-kun no Fushigi na Tabi	Carry Lab	Square	May 1, 1987	Later released as a cartridge for the NES as Mystery Quest, with different levels.
Hikari Shinwa: Parutena no Kagami	Nintendo R&D1; Tose	Nintendo	December 19, 1986	Later released as a cartridge for the NES as Kid Icarus.
Hikaru Genji: Roller Panic	Pony Canyon	Pony Canyon	March 20, 1989	
Hong Kong	Tokuma Shoten	Tokuma Shoten	March 23, 1990	Famimaga Disk Vol. 1
The Hyrule Fantasy: Zelda no Densetsu	Nintendo R&D4	Nintendo	February 21, 1986	Released in 1987 as a cartridge for the NES as The Legend of Zelda and then rereleased on a cartridge for the Famicom in 1994.
I Am a Teacher: Super Mario Sweater	Royal Kougyou	Royal Kougyou	August 27, 1986	
I am a Teacher: Teami no Kiso	Royal Kougyou	Royal Kougyou	September 26, 1986	
Ice Climber	Nintendo R&D1	Nintendo	November 18, 1988	Only available through Disk Writer kiosks. A conversion of VS. Ice Climber, and originally a cartridge the for Famicom and NES.
Ice Hockey	Nintendo R&D4	Nintendo	January 21, 1988	Later released as a cartridge for the NES.
Igo: Kyū Roban Taikyoku	Bullet-Proof Software	Bullet-Proof Software	April 14, 1987	Later released as a cartridge for the Famicom.
Ishido	Hiro	Hiro	December 7, 1990	Only available through Disk Writer kiosks.
Jaaman Tanteidan: Matonarikumi	Jastec	Bandai	November 29, 1988	
Janken Disk Jō	Tokuma Shoten	Tokuma Shoten	December 22, 1992	Famimaga Disk Vol. 6, Only available through Disk Writer kiosks.
Jikai Shounen Mettomag	Thinking Rabbit	Square	July 3, 1987	
Kaettekita Mario Bros.	Intelligent Systems	Nintendo	November 30, 1988	Only available through Disk Writer kiosks. Released in Europe as a cartridge for the NES as Mario Bros Classic
Kalin no Tsurugi	XTALSOFT	Square	October 2, 1987	
Kamen Rider Black: Taiketsu Shadow Moon	Sonata	Bandai	April 15, 1988	
Karate Champ	Data East; Sakata SAS	Data East	July 22, 1988	Originally released as a cartridge for the NES.
Kattobi! Dōji	Pack-In-Video	Pack-In-Video	October 20, 1989	
Kick and Run	Taito	Taito	September 13, 1988	
Kick Challenger: Air Foot	VAP	VAP	November 20, 1987	
Kidō Keisatsu Patlabor	Advance Communication Company	Bandai	January 24, 1989	
Kieta Princess	Imagineer	Imagineer	December 20, 1986	Released as a part of the WaveJack series in special packaging with an included audio cassette.
Kiki Kaikai: Dotō-hen	Bits Laboratory	Taito	August 28, 1987	
Kineko: The Monitor Puzzle	Tamtex	Irem	November 28, 1986	
Kineko: The Monitor Puzzle - Vol. II	Tamtex	Irem	May 1, 1987	Only available through Disk Writer kiosks.
Kinnikuman: Kinnikusei Ōi Sōdatsusen	Sonata	Bandai	May 1, 1987	
Knight Lore: Majou no Ookami Otoko	Tose	Jaleco	December 19, 1986	
Knight Move	JV Dialog	Nintendo	June 5, 1990	
Konamic Ice Hockey	Konami	Konami	July 22, 1988	Later released as a cartridge for the NES as Blades of Steel.
Konamic Tennis	Konami	Konami	August 19, 1988	
Koneko Monogatari: The Adventures of Chatran	Marionette	Pony Canyon	September 19, 1986	
The Legend of Zelda 2: Link no Bōken	Nintendo R&D4	Nintendo	January 14, 1987	Released in 1988 as a cartridge for the NES as Zelda II: The Adventure of Link.
Lutter	Athena	Athena	November 24, 1989	Only available through Disk Writer kiosks.
Magma Project Hacker	Bits Laboratory	Tokuma Shoten	August 10, 1989	
Mah-Jong	Nintendo R&D2	Nintendo	February 21, 1986	Originally released as a cartridge for the Famicom and NES.
Mahjong Kazoku	Irem	Irem	August 4, 1987	
Märchen Veil	System Sacom	Sunsoft	March 3, 1987	
Matō no Hōkai: The Hero of Babel	Carry Lab	Pony Canyon	September 2, 1988	
Meikyū Jiin Dababa	Konami	Konami	May 29, 1987	
Metroid	Nintendo R&D1; Intelligent Systems	Nintendo	August 6, 1986	Later released as a cartridge for the NES.
Michael English Daibōken	Scorpion Soft	Scorpion Soft	June 19, 1987	
Moero TwinBee: Cinnamon-hakase o Sukue!	Konami	Konami	November 21, 1986	Released as a cartridge for the NES as Stinger without 3-Player mode, and then rereleased on a cartridge for the Famicom.
Monty no Doki Doki Dai Dassō: Monty on the Run	Jaleco	Jaleco	July 31, 1987	
Moon Ball Magic	System Sacom	Square	July 12, 1988	Only available through Disk Writer kiosks.
Mr. Gold: Tōyama no Kinsan in Space	Toei Animation	Toei Animation	July 19, 1988	
Nakayama Miho no Tokimeki High School	Square; Nintendo R&D1	Nintendo	December 1, 1987	Released on a blue disk.
Namida no Sōkoban Special	Thinking Rabbit	ASCII	July 30, 1986	
Nankin no Adventure	Sunsoft	Sunsoft	December 9, 1988	
Nazo no Kabe: Block-kuzushi	Konami	Konami	December 13, 1986	Later released as a cartridge for the NES as Crackout exclusively to PAL regions.
Nazo no Murasame Jō	Nintendo R&D4; Human Entertainment	Nintendo	April 14, 1986	Also commonly known in English as The Mysterious Murasame Castle.
Nazoler Land Dai-2 Gō	Sunsoft	Sunsoft	June 12, 1987	
Nazoler Land Dai-3 Gō	Sunsoft	Sunsoft	March 11, 1988	
Nazoler Land Special!! Quiz Ō o Sagase	Sunsoft	Sunsoft	December 18, 1987	
Nazoler Land Sōkan Gō	Sunsoft	Sunsoft	February 6, 1987	
Omoikkiri Tanteidan Haado Gumi: Matenrō no Chōsenjō	Daiei Seisakusho	Bandai	March 25, 1988	
Othello	HAL Laboratory	Kawada	October 13, 1986	Later released as a cartridge for the Famicom and NES.
Otocky	Scitron & Art; SEDIC	ASCII	March 27, 1987	
Pac-Man	Namco	Namco	May 18, 1990	Only available through Disk Writer kiosks. Originally released as a cartridge for the Famicom and NES.
Pachicom	Bear's	Toshiba EMI	October 4, 1988	Only available through Disk Writer kiosks. Originally released as a cartridge for the Famicom and NES.
Pachinko GP	Marionette	Data East	November 18, 1988	
Panic Space	Tokuma Shoten	Tokuma Shoten	October 19, 1990	Famimaga Disk Vol. 2, Only available through Disk Writer kiosks.
Pinball	Nintendo R&D1; HAL Laboratory	Nintendo	May 30, 1989	Only available through Disk Writer kiosks. Originally released as a cartridge for the Famicom and NES.
Pro Golfer Saru: Kage no Tournament	Tose	Bandai	May 25, 1987	
Professional Mahjong Gokū	Chat Noir	ASCII	December 25, 1986	
Pro Wrestling: Famicom Wrestling Association	Nintendo R&D3	Nintendo	October 21, 1986	Later released as a cartridge for the NES as Pro Wrestling.
Pulsar no Hikari: Space Wars Simulation	Soft Pro International	Soft Pro International	October 2, 1987	
Putt Putt Golf	Pack-In-Video	Pack-In-Video	March 30, 1989	
Puyo Puyo	Compile	Tokuma Shoten	October 25, 1991	Famimaga Disk Vol. 5, Only available through Disk Writer kiosks, Later released as a cartridge for the Famicom.
Puzzle Boys	Atlus	Atlus	November 16, 1990	Only available through Disk Writer kiosks.
Radical Bomber!! Jirai-kun	Jaleco	Jaleco	July 29, 1988	
Reflect World	East Cube	East Cube	June 2, 1987	
Relics: Ankoku Yōsai	Bothtec	Bothtec	April 10, 1987	
Replicart	Taito	Taito	February 26, 1988	Released in pencil-pouch case.
Risa no Yōsei Densetsu	Konami	Konami	June 21, 1988	
Roger Rabbit	Kemco	Kemco	February 16, 1989	Later released as a cartridge for the NES as The Bugs Bunny Crazy Castle with cosmetic changes.
Samurai Sword	Capcom	Capcom	November 15, 1988	
Santa Claus no Takarabako	Data East	Data East	December 4, 1987	
SD Gundam World: Gachapon Senshi - Scramble Wars	Sonata	Bandai	November 20, 1987	
SD Gundam World: Gachapon Senshi - Scramble Wars Map Collection	Sonata	Bandai	March 3, 1989	
Section Z	Capcom	Capcom	May 25, 1987	Later released as a cartridge for the NES.
Seiken Psycho Caliber: Majū no Mori Densetsu	Imagineer	Imagineer	May 19, 1987	Released as a part of the WaveJack series in special packaging with an included audio cassette.
Smash Ping Pong	Konami	Nintendo	May 30, 1987	
Soccer	Intelligent Systems	Nintendo	February 21, 1986	Originally released as a cartridge for the Famicom and NES.
Solomon no Kagi	Tecmo	Tecmo	January 25, 1991	Only available through Disk Writer kiosks. Originally released as a cartridge for the Famicom in 1986 and then later released for NES as Solomon's Key.
Suishō no Dragon	Square	Square	December 15, 1986	
Super Boy Allan	ASK Kodansha	Sunsoft	March 27, 1987	
Super Lode Runner	Tamtex	Irem	March 5, 1987	
Super Lode Runner II	Tamtex	Irem	August 25, 1987	Only available through Disk Writer kiosks.
Super Mario Bros.	Nintendo R&D4	Nintendo	February 21, 1986	Originally released as a cartridge for the Famicom and NES.
Super Mario Bros. 2	Nintendo R&D4	Nintendo	June 3, 1986	Later released in the Super NES compilation Super Mario All-Stars as Super Mario Bros.: The Lost Levels.
Sylviana: Ai Ippai no Boukensha	Pack-In-Video	Pack-In-Video	August 10, 1988	
Tama & Friends: 3 Choume Daibouken	Advance Communication Company	Bandai	February 23, 1989	
Tanigawa Kōji no Shōgi Shinan II: Meijin e no Michi	Pony Canyon	Pony Canyon	November 13, 1987	Later released as a cartridge for the Famicom.
Tanigawa Kōji no Shōgi Shinan II: Shinban	Pony Canyon	Pony Canyon	August 10, 1988	Purchased by sending a disk card to Nintendo or by rewriting.
Tantei Jingūji Saburō: Kiken na Futari - Zenpen	Data East	Data East	December 9, 1988	Disk 1
Tantei Jingūji Saburō: Kiken na Futari - Kōhen	Data East	Data East	February 10, 1989	Disk 2
Tantei Jingūji Saburō: Shinjuku Chūō Kōen Satsujin Jiken	Data East	Data East	April 24, 1987	
Tarot Uranai	Scorpion Soft	Scorpion Soft	December 23, 1988	
Tennis	Nintendo R&D1; Intelligent Systems	Nintendo	February 21, 1986	Originally released as a cartridge for the Famicom and NES.
Time Twist: Rekishi no Katasumi de... - Zenpen	Nintendo R&D4; Pax Softnica	Nintendo	July 26, 1991	Also commonly known in English as Time Twist: On the Outskirts of History... Disk 1.
Time Twist: Rekishi no Katasumi de... - Kōhen	Nintendo R&D4; Pax Softnica	Nintendo	July 26, 1991	Also commonly known in English as Time Twist: On the Outskirts of History... Disk 2.
Titanic Mystery: Ao no Senritsu	Gakken	Gakken	July 24, 1987	
Tobidase Daisakusen	Square	Square	March 12, 1987	Later released as a cartridge for the NES as The 3-D Battles of WorldRunner.
Topple Zip	Bothtec	Bothtec	October 9, 1987	
Transformers: The Headmasters	Takara	Takara	August 28, 1987	
TwinBee	Konami	Konami	March 11, 1988	Only available through Disk Writer kiosks. Originally released as a cartridge for the Famicom.
Ultraman Club: Chikyū Dakkan Sakusen	Interlink	Bandai	October 22, 1988	
Ultraman: Kaijū Teikoku no Gyakushū	Bandai	Bandai	January 29, 1987	
Ultraman 2: Shutsugeki Katoku Tai!!	Daiei Seisakusho	Bandai	December 18, 1987	
Volleyball	Pax Softnica	Nintendo	July 21, 1986	Later released as a cartridge for the NES.
Vs. Excitebike	Nintendo R&D4	Nintendo	December 9, 1988	
Wakusei Aton Gaiden	Kokuzeichou	Kokuzeichou	November 1990	Produced as a promotional campaign by Japan's National Tax Agency
Wardner no Mori	Daiei Seisakusho	Taito	March 25, 1988	
Winter Games	Atelier Double	Pony Canyon	March 27, 1987	Later released as a cartridge for the NES.
Wrecking Crew	Nintendo R&D1	Nintendo	February 3, 1989	Only available through Disk Writer kiosks. Originally released as a cartridge for the Famicom and NES.
Xevious	Namco	Namco	May 18, 1990	Only available through Disk Writer kiosks. Originally released as a cartridge for the Famicom and NES.
Yōkai Yashiki	Irem	Irem	October 23, 1987	
Yume Kōjō: Doki Doki Panic	Nintendo R&D4	Fuji TV	July 10, 1987	Modified and released in 1988 as a cartridge for the NES as Super Mario Bros. 2, and in 1992 for the Famicom as Super Mario USA.
Yū Maze	Daiei Seisakusho	Taito	October 28, 1988	
Yūshi no Monshō: Deep Dungeon	HummingBirdSoft	Square	May 30, 1987	
Zanac	Compile	Pony Canyon	November 28, 1986	Later released as a cartridge for the NES.

== Unlicensed ==
Title	Publisher(s)	Release date			
Title	Publisher(s)	Release date	Aki to Tsukasa no Fushigi no Kabe	Super PIG	19??
Bishōjo Control	Wild	19??			
Bishōjo Kachinuki Renju Gomokunarabe	Super PIG	19??			
Bishōjo Mahjong Club		19??			
Bishōjo Meijin Ikusa	Indie Soft; Hacker International	19??			
Bishōjo Sexy Derby	Super PIG	1988			
Bishōjo Sexy Slot	Super PIG	19??			
Bishōjo SF Alien Battle	Hacker International	19??			
Bishōjo Shashinkan: Moving School	Phoenix	19??			
Bishōjo Shashinkan: Studio Cut	Phoenix	19??			
BodyConQuest I: Abakareshi Musume Tachi	Hacker International; Indie Soft	1987			
Casino de Pink	Wild	19??			
Date de Blackjack	Hacker International	19??			
Kobayashi Hitomi no Hold Up	Hacker International	19??			
Lipstick #1: Lolita Hen	Mimi	1988			
Lipstick #2: Joshi Gakusei Hen	Mimi	1988			
Lipstick #3: OL Hen	Mimi	1988			
Lipstick #4: Hakui no Tenshi Hen	Mimi	1988			
Lipstick #5: Stewardess Hen	Mimi	1988			
Mario Bobble	Sun	1989			
Emi-chan no Moero Yakyūken	Super PIG	1987			
Sailor Fuku Bishōjo Zukan Vol.1	Mimi	1989			
Sailor Fuku Bishōjo Zukan Vol.2	Mimi	1989			
Sailor Fuku Bishōjo Zukan Vol.3	Mimi	1989			
Sailor Fuku Bishōjo Zukan Vol.4	Mimi	1989			
Sailor Fuku Bishōjo Zukan Vol.5	Mimi	1989			
Sailor Fuku Bishōjo Zukan Vol.6	Mimi	1989			
Sexy Invaders	Super PIG	1990			
Zatsugaku Olympic Part II	Phoenix	19??			

== Unreleased ==
Title	Publisher(s)	Year			
Title	Publisher(s)	Year	Air Fortress	HAL Laboratory	1987
Aliens: Alien 2	Square	1987			
Densetsu no Kishi: Elrond	Jaleco	1987			
The Money Game	SOFEL	1987			
Rockman	Capcom	1987			
Final Fantasy	Square	1987			
Balloon Fight	Nintendo	1986			
Kattobi! Warabe Ko	Pack-In-Video	1989			
Gomoku Narabe Renju	Nintendo	1987			
