= Rocky's Boots =

1982 educational video game

- Box art for IBM PC version
- Publisher: The Learning Company
- Designers: Warren Robinett; Leslie Grimm
- Platforms: Apple II, TRS-80 Color Computer, Commodore 64, IBM PC, IBM PCjr
- Release: 1982
- Genre: Educational
- Mode: Single-player

Rocky's Boots is an educational logic puzzle game by Warren Robinett and Leslie Grimm, published by The Learning Company in 1982. It was released for the Apple II, TRS-80 Color Computer, Commodore 64, IBM PC, and the IBM PCjr. It won Software of the Year awards from Learning Magazine (1983), Parent's Choice magazine (1983), and InfoWorld (1982, runner-up), and received the Gold Award (for selling 100,000 copies) from the Software Publishers Association. It was one of the first educational software products for personal computers to successfully use an interactive graphical simulation as a learning environment.

A more difficult sequel was released in 1984: Robot Odyssey.

== Gameplay ==
Rocky's Boots directing the player to build a machine that kicks only blue-colored crosses (MS-DOS)

The object of the beginning part of Rocky's Boots is to use a mechanical boot to kick a series of objects (purple or green squares, diamonds, circles, or crosses) off a conveyor belt; each object will score some number of points, possibly negative. To ensure that the boot only kicks the positive objects, the player must connect a series of logic gates to the boot.

The player is represented by an orange square, and picks up devices (the boot, logic gates, clackers, etc.) by moving their square over them and hitting the joystick button. When the boot has kicked all of the positive objects and none of the negative objects (obtaining a score of 24 points), Rocky (a raccoon) will appear and do a beeping dance.

Later, the player finds that they can use all of the game's objects, including AND gates, OR gates, NOT gates, and flip-flops, in an open-ended area to design one's own logic circuits and "games". The colors of orange and white are used to show the binary logic states of 1 and 0. As the circuits operate, the signals can be seen slowly propagating through the circuits, as if the electricity was liquid orange fire flowing through transparent pipes.

== Development ==
Rocky's Boots was designed by Warren Robinett and Leslie Grimm. The style of the game was modeled after Robinett's 1980 Atari Video Computer System cartridge Adventure; Rocky's Boots was originally going to be a sequel. Robinett experienced constraints due to The Learning Company being a start-up, forcing Rocky's Boots to be less ambitious than he would have liked.

== Reception ==
II Computing listed Rocky's Boots ninth on the magazine's list of top Apple II education software as of late 1985, based on sales and market-share data. Commodore Microcomputers stated that it "is intuitive and easy for kids of all ages to understand". The magazine approved of the game's lack of "nerve-wracking time limits or invading aliens" and encouragement of "exploratory learning" while teaching "nothing less than the fundamentals of digital computer logic from the ground up". Computer Gaming World called Rocky's Boots "outstanding". The review complimented the game's appeal to both children and adults, and its ability to teach Boolean functions in a non-threatening way. InfoWorld commented positively on the game combining play with educational value and conveying circuit design and Boolean logic to children. InfoWorld's Essential Guide to Atari Computers recommended the game among educational software for the Atari 8-bit.

== Legacy ==
The engine for the game was used in several other games by The Learning Company, including the sequel Robot Odyssey, and a later game called Gertrude's Secrets.
