= ChipWits =

1984 video game

- Publishers: BrainPower (Apple II, Mac); Epyx (C64)
- Designers: Doug Sharp; Mike Johnston
- Platforms: Apple II, Commodore 64, Mac
- Release: 1984: Mac; 1985: Apple II, C64
- Genre: Programming game
- Mode: Single-player

ChipWits is a programming game for the Macintosh written by Doug Sharp and Mike Johnston and published by BrainPower software in 1984. Ports to the Apple II and Commodore 64 were published by Epyx in 1985. The player uses a visual programming language to teach a virtual robot how to navigate various mazes of varying difficulty. The game straddles the line between entertainment and programming education.

Logo from 1984 manual

== Development ==
The game was developed using the MacFORTH implementation of the Forth programming language for the Macintosh 128K. The Commodore 64 version was written in SuperForth 64.

== Reception ==
Computer Gaming World preferred Robot Odyssey to ChipWits but stated that both were "incredibly vivid simulation experiences". The magazine criticized ChipWits' inability to save more than 16 robots or copy a robot to a new save slot, and cautioned that it "may be too simple for people familiar with programming". The magazine added that the criticism was "more a cry for a more complex Chipwits II game than condemnation of the current product".

ChipWits won the MACazine Best of '85 and MacUser's Editor's Choice 1985 Award and was named 8th best Apple game of all time by Maclife.

== Legacy ==
From 2006 to 2008, Mike Johnston and Doug Sharp developed and released ChipWits II, written in Adobe AIR. That version featured several innovations including an in-game tutorial, updated graphics, a soundtrack, isometric and 3D rendering, several new chips, and new missions.

In September 2021, ChipWits, Inc. was formed by Doug Sharp and Mark Roth to create a modern reboot of the game. The new version is written in Unity and is released on Steam with a free demo.

In November 2024, in celebration of the game's 40th anniversary, ChipWits, Inc. recovered and open sourced the game's original Forth source code for the Macintosh and Commodore 64.

The original games are available to play in emulation.

== See also ==
- Rocky's Boots
- Logic simulation
