= Time Twist: Rekishi no Katasumi de... =

1991 video game

- Disk 1 box art (left) and Disk 2 box art (right)
- Developers: Nintendo R&D4; Pax Softnica
- Publisher: Nintendo
- Director: Keiji Terui
- Producer: Tatsuya Hishida
- Programmer: Tomoshige Hashishita
- Composer: Hajime Hirasawa
- Platform: Family Computer Disk System
- Release: JP: July 26, 1991
- Genre: Adventure
- Mode: Single-player

Time Twist: Rekishi no Katasumi de... (タイムツイスト 歴史のかたすみで…; Time Twist: On the Outskirts of History...) is a 1991 adventure game developed by Nintendo and Pax Softnica and published by Nintendo for the Family Computer Disk System. Known for its disturbing subject matter, including allusions to real life atrocities and religion, it was never released outside of Japan.

== Development ==
The Nintendo EAD and Pax Softnica collaboration began on Shin Onigashima and continued through Yūyūki. On the original two works, Nintendo EAD handled the story design and character designs with Tatsuya Hishida leading the efforts as creative director on the behalf of Nintendo. Development on Time Twist shifted towards Pax Softnica and designer Keiji Terui as Nintendo EAD only provided the music and production tasks.

== Gameplay ==
Screenshot of Time Twist: Rekishi no Katasumi de....

The game is played by choosing text commands given on the screen. The nameless protagonist is a young boy whose soul becomes separated from his body by a devil, allowing him to temporarily take control of other humans and animals. He must use this ability to thwart the plans of the time-traveling devil and return to his own body.

Time Twist plays from a third-person perspective.

The game takes place in real historical locations and deals with serious themes such as religion, war and racism. Despite the serious setting, the game handles the topics with some light comic relief. Logic puzzles and historical trivia questions are presented over the course of the game, and the player must solve these correctly in order to progress. Unlike in previous Nintendo adventure games, players cannot get a "Game Over". Making a wrong choice will simply halt progress or return them to the previous scene to try again.

Like the Famicom Mukashibanashi games, all text in Time Twist is presented in hiragana, including names of non-Japanese objects, people, and countries, which would normally be written in katakana. The only sections of the game that contain katakana and kanji are the title screen and staff roll.

== Plot ==
=== Introduction ===
The year is 1995, the impending turn of the 20th century is instilling fear and uncertainty in mankind, and fortune-telling shows have become popular.

On September 25, a young boy living in Tokyo hears on a fortune-telling show that he will meet the girl of his dreams in a museum located outside the city limits. He visits the "Devil Museum" and meets a girl inside, but a sudden earthquake cuts their meeting short. The boy recites the incantation from the fortune-telling show said to "capture the heart of the girl of his dreams", but the incantation destroys the seal on a vase containing the devil.

The reanimated devil takes control of the boy's body, leaving the boy trapped in the devil's decaying body. He chases the devil to the house of Dr. Simon, a physics scientist hiding from the media. The devil has stolen the scientist's time machine called the "Time Belt" and uses it to travel back in time. The young boy's soul is also pulled back into the past by the Time Belt.

=== Settings and characters ===
Below is a table listing the various events and historical personages that appear throughout the game. Joan of Arc, Alexander the Great, Abraham Lincoln and Jesus of Nazareth are described as the "Children of God", who have been sent to quell the disturbances caused by the devil.

Disk	Year	Location	Historical occurrences	Historical personages	Important items
One	1995	Tokyo, Japan	Fortune telling has become popular due to growing uncertainty towards the end of the 20th century.	none	Devil's portrait
One	1428	A castle town in Medieval France	A witch hunt conducted by the church is targeting societal misfits.	Joan of Arc	Box of sabbath
One	1944	A World War II POW camp in Southern Germany	Towards the end of the European Theater.	Adolf Hitler	Gypsy charm
Two	Around 400 BC	Athens in Ancient Greece	Expansion of the Macedonian Empire	Alexander the Great, Aristotle, Plato, Socrates, Herodotus, Pythagoras, Homer	Bell of admonition
Two	1864	A cotton plantation in Atlanta, Georgia	The American Civil War and the Emancipation Proclamation	Abraham Lincoln	Devil's claw
Two	Around 4 BC	Nazareth and Bethlehem	Annunciation, The Nativity, and the Adoration of the Magi	Virgin Mary, Saint Joseph, Jesus of Nazareth, the Three Wise Men	Demon sealing vase
Two	1995	Tokyo, Japan	The world has been destroyed by nuclear warfare.	none	Devil's portrait

=== Important items ===
Certain items appear in each age which play a key role in completing the game. All of these items (excluding the Devil's portrait) were collected by the museum owner and displayed at the museum as historical artifacts.

Devil's portrait
A portrait drawn by the owner of the museum using artistic techniques developed in all different parts of the world. It was not displayed in the museum because it was never completed; it hangs on the wall of the museum owner's home. The depiction of the devil closely resembles that of the protagonist. The player later meets the museum owner in 1944, where he is revealed to be Cougar, an American POW who made friends with Dr. Simon. When the player revisits 1995, the painting changes to resemble Jesus under demonic possession.
Box of Sabbath
A weighty box engraved with unsettling patterns. A corrupt bishop makes a pact with the devil and later hides his contract within this box.
Gypsy charm
An ancient good-luck charm placed within a pendant. An incantation that dispels the devil is engraved on its star-shaped metal plate. It was given to an American soldier by a prisoner of war.
Bell of admonition
A small hand bell used by the Egyptian pharaoh to repel the devil. An Athenian doctor Nicolas received it from a Spartan soldier as payment for his services.
Devil's claw
A statue in the likeness of the sharp, clawlike hand of the devil. Was used as a religious icon by worshipers of the devil. While the player does encounter it, they never interact with it; it is seen used in a meeting by the Ku Klux Klan during a stealth section.
Demon sealing vase
A beautifully engraved droplet vase presented to the infant Jesus of Nazareth by the three magi. Jesus seals the devil into this vase in 27 AD.

== Release ==
Time Twist was the last packaged release on the Disk System when it was released on July 26, 1991, released eight months after the release of the Super Famicom in Japan. Nintendo did not promote the game on television, as they had with their previous adventure games. The game was never given a North American release, due to its mature and religious themes conflicting with Nintendo of America's strict censorship policies at the time. It also portrays disturbing moments in history, such as Nazi German concentration camps, Ku Klux Klan violence, and gives the player an opportunity to assassinate Adolf Hitler and exorcise a demon out of Baby Jesus.

The game's rarity led to the packaged version being exchanged at prices higher than the original 2,600 yen. The rising price of the packaged release made the disk re-writing service a cheaper alternative to buying the game at 500 yen. Nintendo ended the re-writing service for Time Twist in Autumn 2002, a year earlier than the end of all Disk System re-writing in September 2003.

An unofficial English fan translation was released in 2026.

== Reception ==
Time Twist got a Famitsu rating of 25/40 (6, 6, 6, 7, and 6). Family Computer Magazine gave it a 23.5/30.

== See also ==
- Shin Onigashima
- Yūyūki
- Famicom Bunko: Hajimari no Mori
