= MindRover =

1999 video game

MindRover: The Europa Project
- Developer: CogniToy
- Publisher: CogniToy
- Platforms: Windows, Linux, OS X
- Release: November 11, 1999: Windows; NA: November 11, 1999 (Online); NA: December 5, 2000 (retail) Linux; NA: May 23, 2001; EU: December 13, 2002 Mac OS X; NA: October 7, 2003
- Genre: Programming

MindRover: The Europa Project, often shortened to MindRover, is a programming game developed for Windows by CogniToy and published in 1999. Versions were later released for Mac and Linux.

== Gameplay ==
Similar to The Learning Company's Robot Odyssey (1984), the game revolves around three activities:

1. Assemble virtual robots from a library of stock parts.
2. Program robots using a graphical interface (referred to in the game as "wiring") with a paradigm more based on multicomponent circuitry construction than on traditional programming.
3. Participate in events such as robot battles and racing games with newly programmed robot.

== Development ==
The game had a budget of $500,000. In October 2000, CogniToy signed a contract with Tri Synergy to distribute the game to retail stores.

The game was developed for Windows and was released for online retail in 1999, and for traditional retail stores a year later. Add-ons were available to control Lego Mindstorms robots.

The game was ported to Linux by Loki Software and Linux Game Publishing and to the Mac by MacPlay.

== Reception ==
Reception

Aggregate score
Aggregator	Score
GameRankings	87%

Review scores
Publication	Score
CNET Gamecenter	8/10
Computer Games Strategy Plus	4/5
EP Daily	9/10
GameSpot	8/10
IGN	8.5/10
Next Generation	5/5
PC Gamer (US)	89%
PC Zone	86%
Corvallis Gazette-Times	3.5/5

The Windows version received favorable reviews. Carla Harker of NextGen called the retail version "A truly amazing title for anyone looking for something unique and challenging."

It was nominated for the "Best Strategy Game for PC", "Best Independent PC Game", and "Most Innovative Game of the Year" awards at The Electric Playground's Blister Awards 2000, which went to Sacrifice, Combat Mission: Beyond Overlord, and Jet Grind Radio, respectively.
