= Armored Core: Verdict Day =

2013 video game

- Developer: FromSoftware
- Publisher: Namco Bandai Games: JP: FromSoftware
- Director: Naoyuki Takahashi
- Producer: Toshifumi Nabeshima
- Programmer: Kyoichi Murata
- Composers: Kota Hoshino; Yuka Kitamura
- Series: Armored Core
- Platforms: PlayStation 3, Xbox 360
- Release: NA: September 24, 2013; JP/AU: September 26, 2013; EU: September 27, 2013
- Genre: Vehicular combat
- Modes: Single-player, multiplayer

Armored Core: Verdict Day is a 2013 mech action game developed by FromSoftware and published by Namco Bandai Games for PlayStation 3 and Xbox 360. It is a direct sequel to Armored Core V.

== Gameplay ==
The storyline is set in a future world wherein three factions are fighting over natural resources. In online multiplayer mode, which is the main focus of the game, players select a faction and battle players from the others, either in teams or by forming their own team of artificial intelligence-driven mechs called UNACs. These UNACs can be customized with different weapons and skills, and the behavior of AI mechs can be customized as well with their battle tactics and battlefield behavior being fine-tuned through the use of different chips. These chips allow the UNACs' engagement range, weapon usage, speed, line of sight, and other aspects to be modified according to the players' desires. If a player is in the operator seat, no actual players need be on the battlefield; UNACs can be simultaneously deployed, up to taking all 4 player slots as long as a human player acts as operator, and can then dictate objectives and spot specific enemies for each UNAC. The persistent world is reset when one faction dominates the others or when the season ends. The online servers were shut down on March 31, 2024.

== Plot ==
Verdict Day is set 100 years after the events of Armored Core V. The contamination that shrouded much of Earth has begun to subside, exposing the seven Towers: 20-kilometer tall structures containing ancient, highly advanced technology. Disputes over control of the Towers have escalated into the Verdict War, which is principally fought between the "Three Forces": Venide, an autocratic quasi-feudal state that wants to use the Towers to build a world based on the principle of "might is right"; Sirius Corporation, a federation of resource-rich settlements that intends to administer the Towers for the prosperity of all people; and Evergreen Family, a semi-theocratic organization that arose from the refugees who Frances Batty Curtis led out of The City a century ago, and which now seeks to restore the Earth's natural environment. A fourth major power is The Foundation, a research group which claims neutrality in the Verdict War and supplies the Three Forces with advanced weapons, including UNACs (Unmanned Armored Cores). Also of note, an enigmatic four-man Armored Core team called Reaper Squad sometimes intervenes in battles between the factions, attacking all combatants indiscriminately.

The player is an AC pilot known only as the Lone Mercenary, who is supported by transport pilot "Fatman" and operator Magnolia "Maggy" Curtis, a retired ace mercenary and descendant of Frances. The Lone Mercenary initially works contracts for the Three Forces in the Verdict War, some of which involve hunting other mercenaries, whom the Three Factions despise for refusing to pledge loyalty to them. The status quo is interrupted when The Foundation activates a hidden control mechanism in the UNACs, turning them against the Three Forces and seizing all of the Towers. The Lone Mercenary is given missions to counter The Foundation and becomes a target of Reaper Squad, who are discovered to be cybernetically-enhanced pilots in league with The Foundation. Maggy, who retired after being injured by Reaper Squad two years earlier yet never lost her passion for battle, eventually abandons the Lone Mercenary and Fatman when Reaper Squad offers her the means to pilot an AC again. The other members of Reaper Squad subsequently reveal that their purpose is to eliminate exceptional AC pilots, such as the Lone Mercenary and Maggy, to prevent the rise of another "Dark Raven", the legendary AC pilot who defeated the AC named Exusia a century ago. During an assault on one of The Foundation's last strongholds, the Lone Mercenary confronts Maggy, who insists on fighting to the death even when her AC suffers crippling damage.

Following Maggy's defeat, The Foundation's nameless leader challenges the Lone Mercenary to a duel with Reaper Squad's commander and last surviving member, "J", who is armed with the N-WGIX/v, an ancient AC model retrieved from a Tower. The Lone Mercenary destroys J, but it is a hollow victory. The Foundation's leader explains he harbors a boundless hatred of humanity and desires its extinction, gloating that the Towers contain automated factories that have been set to produce hostile UNACs indefinitely. As a result, the Three Forces will continue to be mired in the Verdict War long after the Foundation leader's demise, preventing any of them from restoring order to the world and giving humanity hope for the future. Fatman defiantly retorts that he and the Lone Mercenary will keep fighting as long as they are able.

== Reception ==
Reception

Aggregate score
Aggregator	Score	
Aggregator	PS3	Xbox 360
Metacritic	66/100	65/100

Review scores
Publication	Score	
Publication	PS3	Xbox 360
Eurogamer	8/10	N/A
Famitsu	34/40	34/40
GameSpot	N/A	6/10
GamesRadar+	N/A	3/5
GamesTM	6/10	N/A
IGN	7.6/10	N/A
PlayStation Official Magazine – Australia	6/10	N/A
PlayStation Official Magazine – UK	6/10	N/A
Official Xbox Magazine (US)	N/A	7.5/10
The Digital Fix	6/10	N/A
Metro	6/10	N/A

Verdict Day received "mixed or average reviews" on both platforms according to the review aggregation website Metacritic. Critics pointed the difficulty for newcomers to understand the game and weak story. Most critics agreed that the game would be successful with those who are already into the series but would suffer to add new players to its fanbase. In a more positive light, IGN, although acknowledging the weak graphics and confusing menus of the PS3 version, remarked: "A special kind of magic here that most games would never even attempt".

In Japan, Famitsu gave it a score of two nines and two eights for a total of 34 out of 40. One editor wrote: "The game's pretty difficult and you have to use a ton of buttons, which makes the hurdles seem pretty high at first. But the more you plug away at it, the more you can really feel how much better you're getting at it, which is nice". Another wrote: "The game's focused primarily on online play and that may scare off some players right there. There is a tutorial, but beyond that, you're pretty much thrown into the wilderness. This makes the missions pretty tough from the start, but the mercenaries and UNAC auto-AI system provide beginners with a fair amount of backup, which is key. It's the kind of game that rewards repeated trial and error as you play, and so if you like that, here it is".
