= Nintendo =

Japanese video game company

Coordinates: 34°58′11″N 135°45′22.3″E

Nintendo Co., Ltd.
- Logo used since May 2016 (Note: Variations of this logo with different color schemes have been in use since 1979 (see § Logos).)

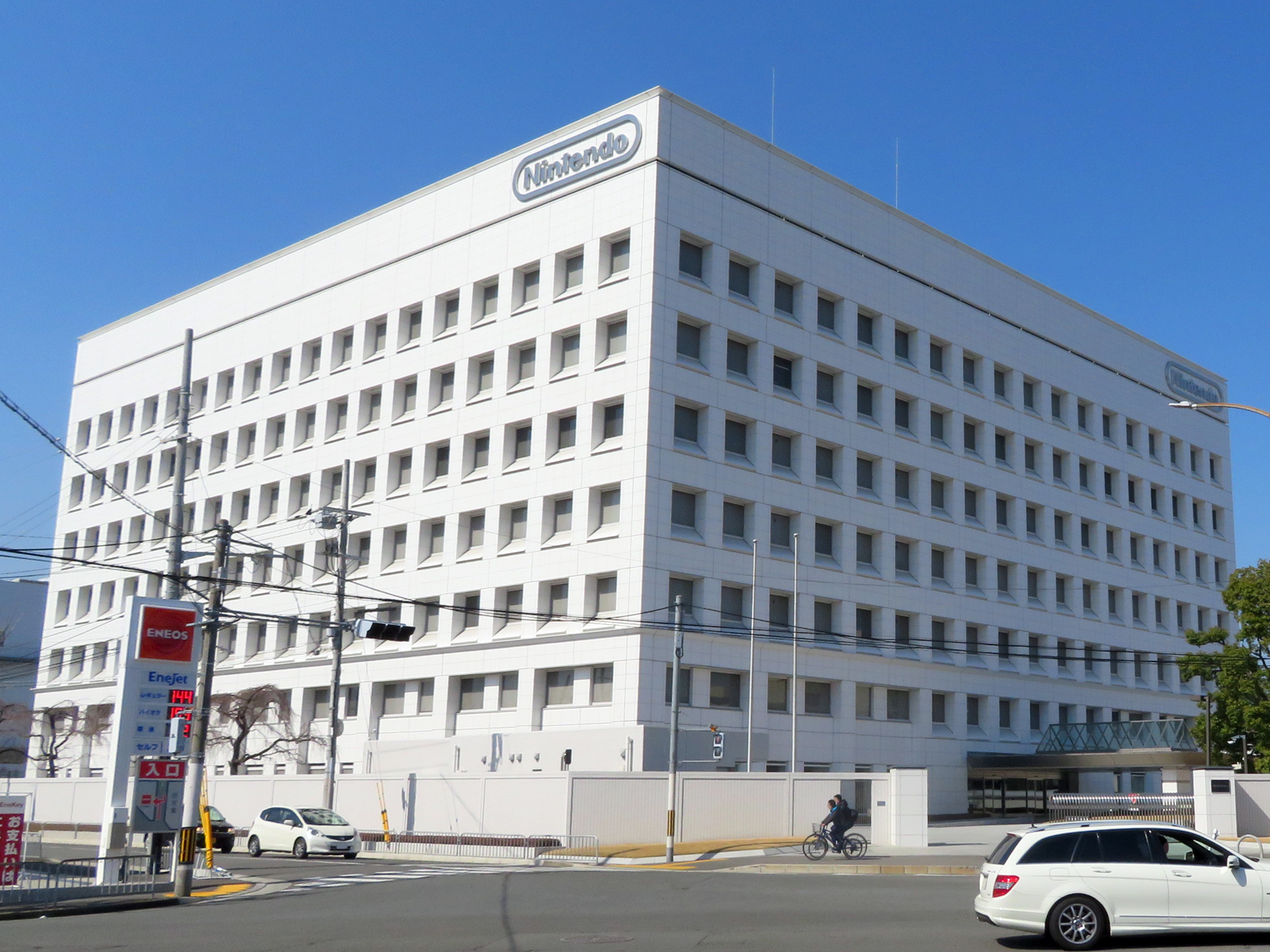
- Headquarters in Kyoto, Japan
- Native name: 任天堂株式会社
- Romanized name: Nintendō kabushiki gaisha
- Formerly: Nintendo Koppai (1889); Yamauchi Nintendo (1889–1933); Yamauchi Nintendo & Co. (1933–1947); Marufuku Co., Ltd. (1947–1951); Nintendo Playing Card Co., Ltd. (1951–1963)
- Type: Public
- Traded as: TYO: 7974; TOPIX Core30 component; Nikkei 225 component
- ISIN: JP3756600007
- Industry: Video games; Electronics
- Founded: 23 September 1889; 137 years ago in Shimogyō-ku, Kyoto, Japan
- Founder: Fusajiro Yamauchi
- Headquarters: 11–1 Kamitoba Hokodatecho, Minami-ku, Kyoto, Japan
- Area served: Worldwide
- Key people: Shuntaro Furukawa (president); Shigeru Miyamoto (executive fellow)
- Products: List of products
- Production output: Hardware ▲23.66 million; Software ▲185.62 million; (FY26)
- Brands: Video game series: Animal Crossing; Art Style; Big Brain Academy; bit Generations; BoxBoy!; Brain Age; Chibi-Robo!; Cruis'n; Custom Robo; Donkey Kong; Dr. Mario; Excite; F-Zero; Famicom Detective Club; Fire Emblem; Fossil Fighters; Golden Sun; Kid Icarus; Kirby; The Legend of Zelda; The Legendary Starfy; Mario; Mario Kart; Mario Party; Metroid; Mother; Pikmin; Pilotwings; Pokémon; Punch-Out!!; Puzzle League; Rhythm Heaven; Splatoon; Star Fox; Super Mario; Super Smash Bros.; Tomodachi Life; Touch! Generations; Wario; Wars; Wii; Xenoblade; Yoshi
- Services: Nintendo eShop; My Nintendo; Nintendo Switch Online
- Revenue: ▲¥2.31trillion (FY26)
- Operating income: ▲¥360.1 billion (FY26)
- Net income: ▲¥424 billion (FY26)
- Total assets: ▲¥3.805 trillion (FY26)
- Total equity: ▲¥2.562 trillion (FY26)
- Number of employees: 8,666 (Note: 3,084 of the company's 8,666 employees are employed by Nintendo Co., Ltd. directly. The remaining 5,582 are employed by its subsidiaries.) (2026)
- Divisions: Business Development; Entertainment Planning & Development; Technology Development Division
- Subsidiaries: List: 1-Up Studio; iQue; Mario Club; Monolith Soft; Next Level Games; Nintendo Cube; Nintendo European Research & Development; Nintendo Pictures; Nintendo Sales; Nintendo Software Technology; Nintendo Stars; Nintendo Studios Singapore (80%); Nintendo Systems (80%); Nintendo Technology Development; Retro Studios; Shiver Entertainment; Systems Research & Development
- Website: nintendo.com

Nintendo Co., Ltd. (Note: Japanese: 任天堂株式会社, Hepburn: Nintendō kabushiki gaisha) is a Japanese multinational video game company headquartered in Kyoto. It develops, publishes, and manufactures both video games and video game consoles.

The history of Nintendo began when craftsman Fusajiro Yamauchi founded the company in 1889 to produce handmade hanafuda playing cards. After venturing into various lines of business and becoming a public company, Nintendo began producing toys in the 1960s, and later video games. Nintendo developed its first arcade games in the 1970s, and distributed its first system, the Color TV-Game in 1977. The company became internationally dominant in the 1980s after the arcade release of Donkey Kong (1981) and the Nintendo Entertainment System, which launched outside of Japan alongside Super Mario Bros. in 1985.

Since then, Nintendo has produced some of the most successful consoles in the video game industry, including the Game Boy (1989), the Super Nintendo Entertainment System (1991), the Game Boy Advance (2001), the Nintendo DS (2004), the Wii (2006), the Nintendo Switch (2017), and the Nintendo Switch 2 (2025). It has created or published numerous major franchises, including Mario, Donkey Kong, The Legend of Zelda, Pokémon, Super Smash Bros., Animal Crossing, Splatoon, Metroid, Kirby, Star Fox, Fire Emblem, Pikmin, and Xenoblade. The company's mascot, Mario, is among the most famous fictional characters, and Nintendo's other characters—including Luigi, Princess Peach, Donkey Kong, Samus Aran, Link, Kirby, Pikachu, and Fox McCloud—have attained international recognition. Several films, shows and a theme park area based on the company's franchises have been created.

Nintendo's game consoles have sold over 870 million units worldwide as of November 2026, for which more than 6.2 billion individual games have been sold. The company has numerous subsidiaries in Japan and worldwide, in addition to second-party developers including HAL Laboratory, Intelligent Systems, and Game Freak. It is one of the wealthiest and most valuable companies in the Japanese market.

== History ==
=== Early history ===
==== 1889–1932: Origin as a playing card business ====
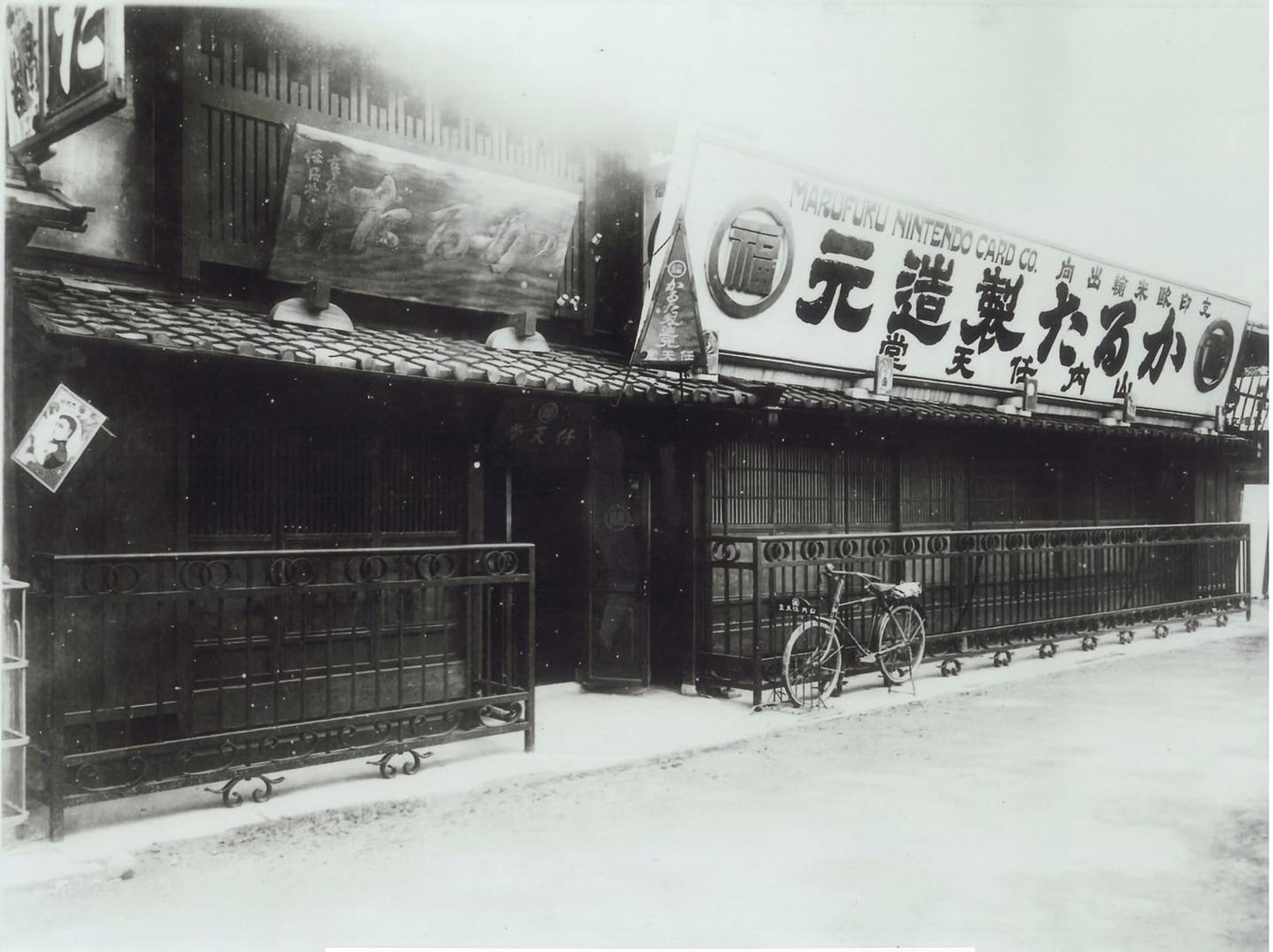
Original Nintendo headquarters (1889–1930) and workshop in Shimogyō-ku, Kyoto, c. 1889. The right section was eventually rebuilt (pictured below), and the left section was reportedly demolished in 2004.

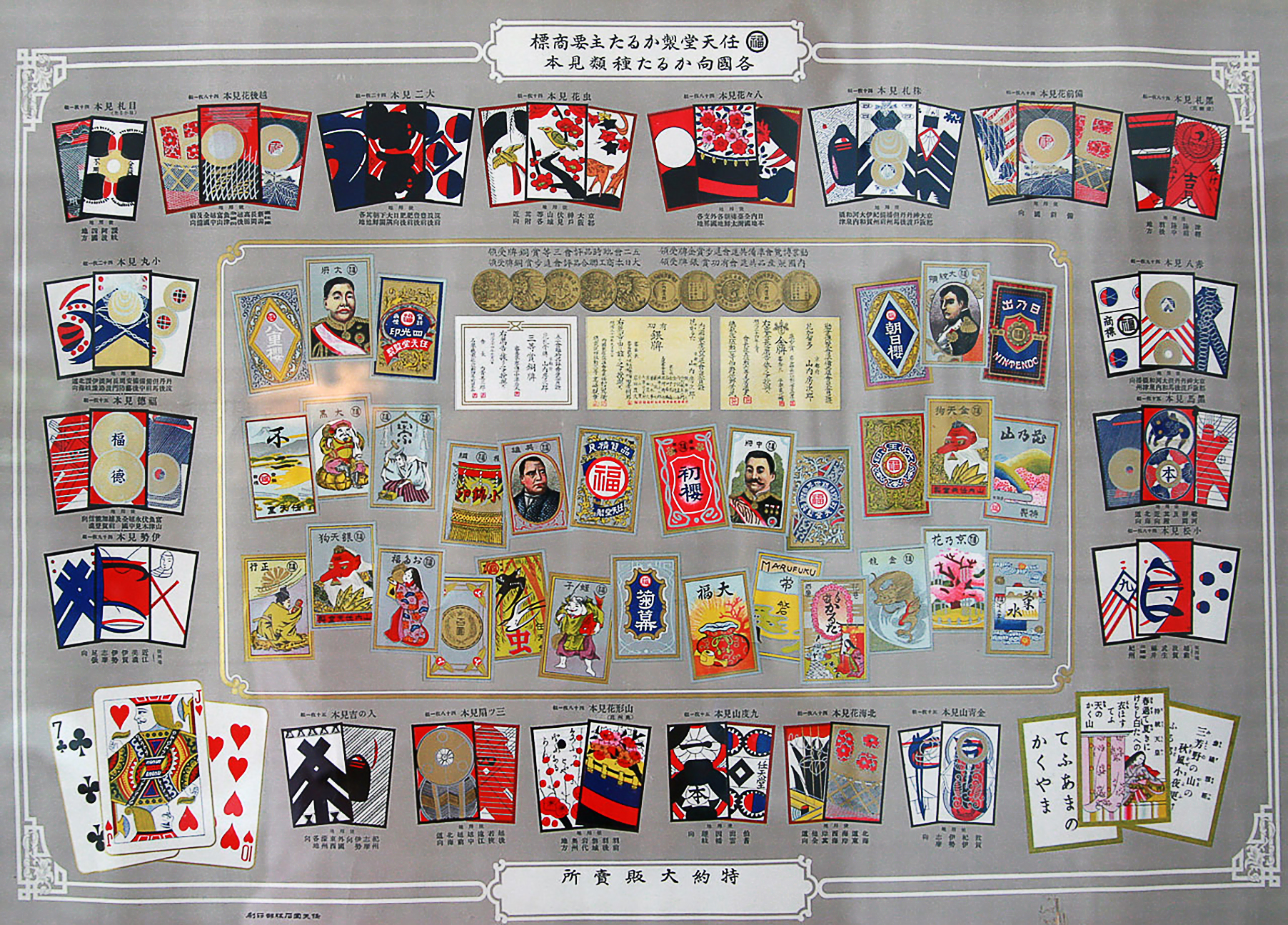
Nintendo karuta poster from the Meiji era

Nintendo was founded as Nintendo Koppai (Note: 任天堂骨牌, Nintendō Koppai) on 23 September 1889 by craftsman Fusajiro Yamauchi in Shimogyō-ku, Kyoto, Japan, as an unincorporated establishment, to produce and distribute Japanese playing cards, or karuta (かるた; from Portuguese carta, 'card'), most notably hanafuda (花札, 'flower cards'). The name "Nintendo" is commonly assumed to mean "leave luck to heaven", but the assumption lacks historical validation; it has also been suggested to mean "the temple of free hanafuda", but even descendants of Yamauchi do not know the true intended meaning of the name. Hanafuda cards had become popular after Japan banned most forms of gambling in 1882, though tolerated hanafuda. Sales of hanafuda cards were popular with the yakuza-run gaming parlors in Kyoto. Other card manufacturers had opted to leave the market, not wanting to be associated with its criminality, but Yamauchi persisted despite such fears to become the primary producer of hanafuda within a few years. With the increase of the cards' popularity, Yamauchi hired assistants to mass-produce them to satisfy the demand. Even with a favorable start, the business faced financial struggles due to operating in a niche market, the slow and expensive manufacturing process, high product price, alongside long durability of the cards, which impacted sales due to the low replacement rate. As a solution, Nintendo produced a cheaper and lower-quality line of playing cards, Tengu, while also conducting product offerings in other cities such as Osaka, where card game profits were high. In addition, local merchants were interested in the prospect of continuous renewal of decks, thus avoiding the suspicions that reusing cards would generate.

According to Nintendo, the business' first western-style card deck was put on the market in 1902, although other documents indicate the date was 1907, shortly after the Russo-Japanese War. Although the cards were initially intended to be exported, they quickly gained popularity within and without Japan. During this time, the business styled itself as Marufuku Nintendo Card Co. The war created considerable difficulties for companies in the leisure sector, which were subject to new levies such as the Karuta Zei ("playing cards tax"). Nintendo subsisted and, in 1907, entered into an agreement with Nihon Senbai—later known as the Japan Tobacco—to market its cards to various cigarette stores throughout the country. A Nintendo promotional calendar from the Taishō era dated to 1915 indicates that the business was named Yamauchi Nintendo (Note: 山内任天堂, Yamauchi Nintendō) but still used the Marufuku Nintendo Co. brand for its playing cards.

Japanese culture stipulated that for Nintendo to continue as a family business after Yamauchi's retirement, Yamauchi had to adopt his son-in-law so that he could take over the business. As a result, Sekiryo Kaneda adopted the Yamauchi surname in 1907 and headed the business in 1929. By that time, Nintendo was the largest playing card business in Japan.

==== 1933–1968: Incorporation and expansion ====
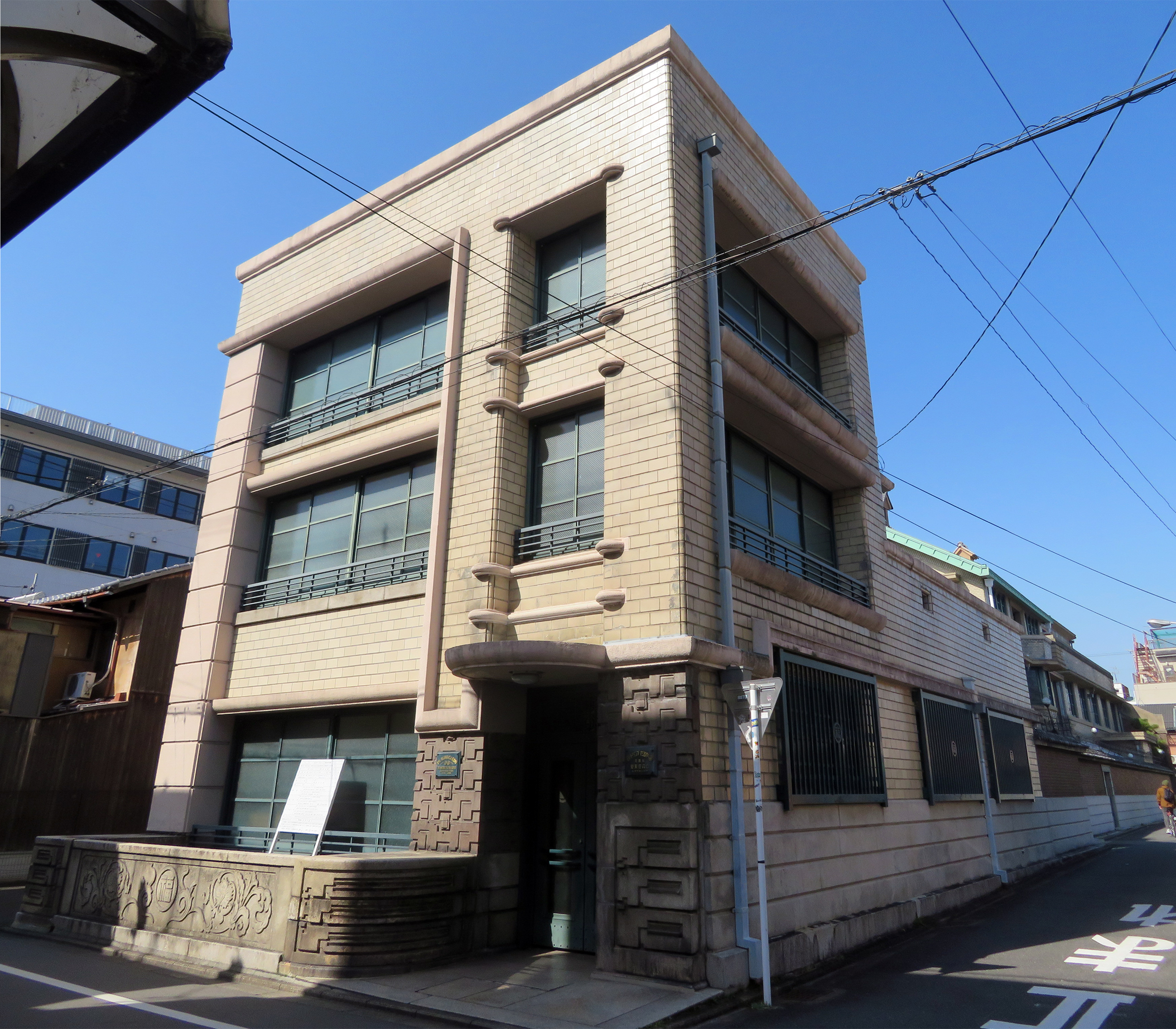
Former Nintendo headquarters (1933–1959), rebuilt from the right section of the original building

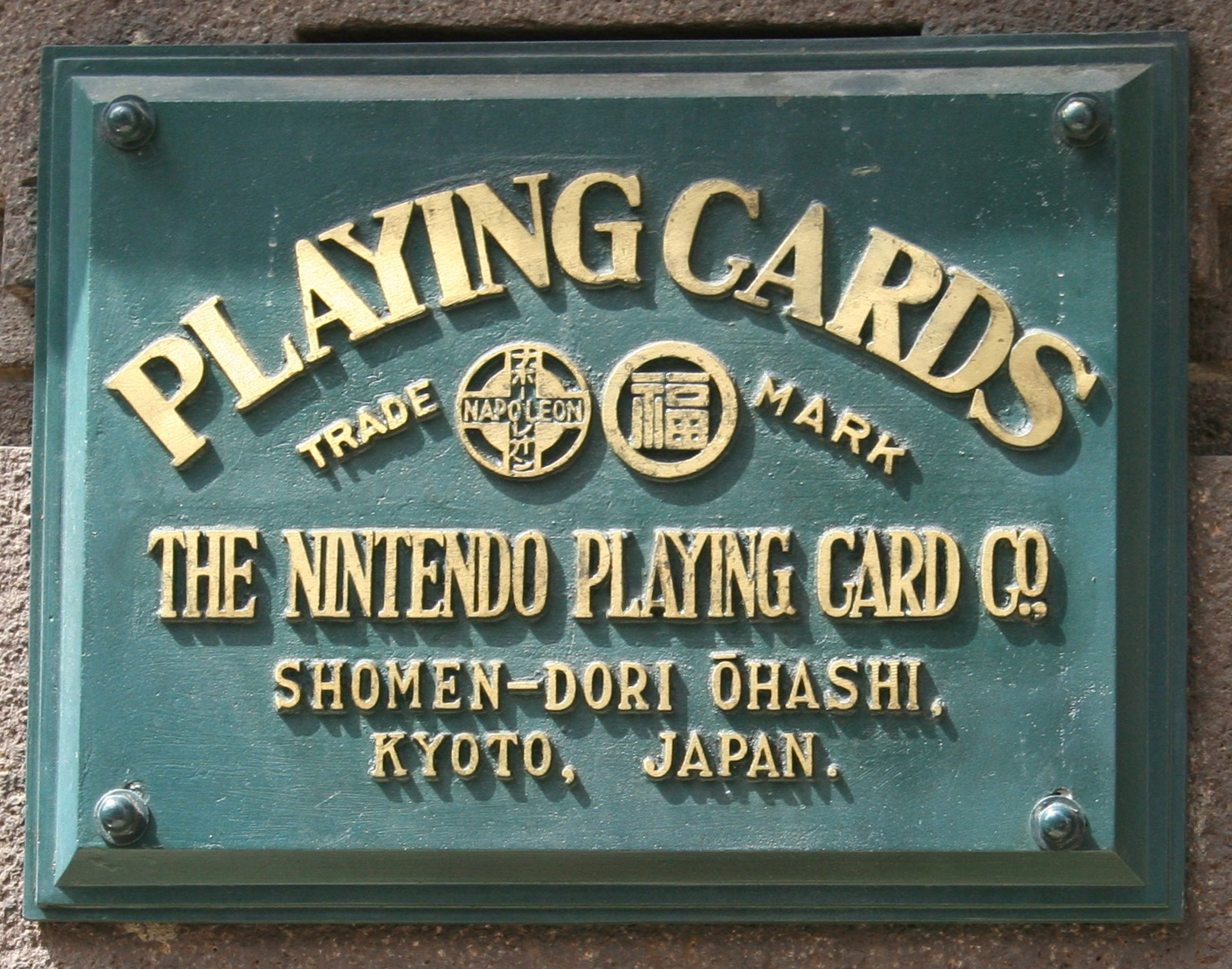
English company information plate in the former Nintendo headquarters

In 1933, Sekiryo Kaneda established the company as a general partnership named Yamauchi Nintendo & Co., Ltd. (Note: 山内任天堂株式会社, Yamauchi Nintendō kabushiki gaisha) investing in the construction of a new corporate headquarters located next to the original building, near the Toba-kaidō train station. Because Sekiryo's marriage to Yamauchi's daughter produced no male heirs, he planned to adopt his son-in-law Shikanojo Inaba, an artist in the company's employ and the father of his grandson Hiroshi, born in 1927. However, Inaba abandoned his family and the company, so Hiroshi was made Sekiryo's eventual successor.

World War II negatively impacted the company as Japanese authorities prohibited the diffusion of foreign card games, and as the priorities of Japanese society shifted, its interest in recreational activities waned. During this time, Nintendo was partly supported by a financial injection from Hiroshi's wife Michiko Inaba, who came from a wealthy family. In 1947, Sekiryo founded the distribution company Marufuku Co., Ltd. (Note: 丸福株式会社, Marufuku kabushiki gaisha) responsible for Nintendo's sales and marketing operations, which would eventually go on to become the present-day Nintendo Co., Ltd., in Higashikawara-cho, Imagumano, Higashiyama-ku, Kyoto.

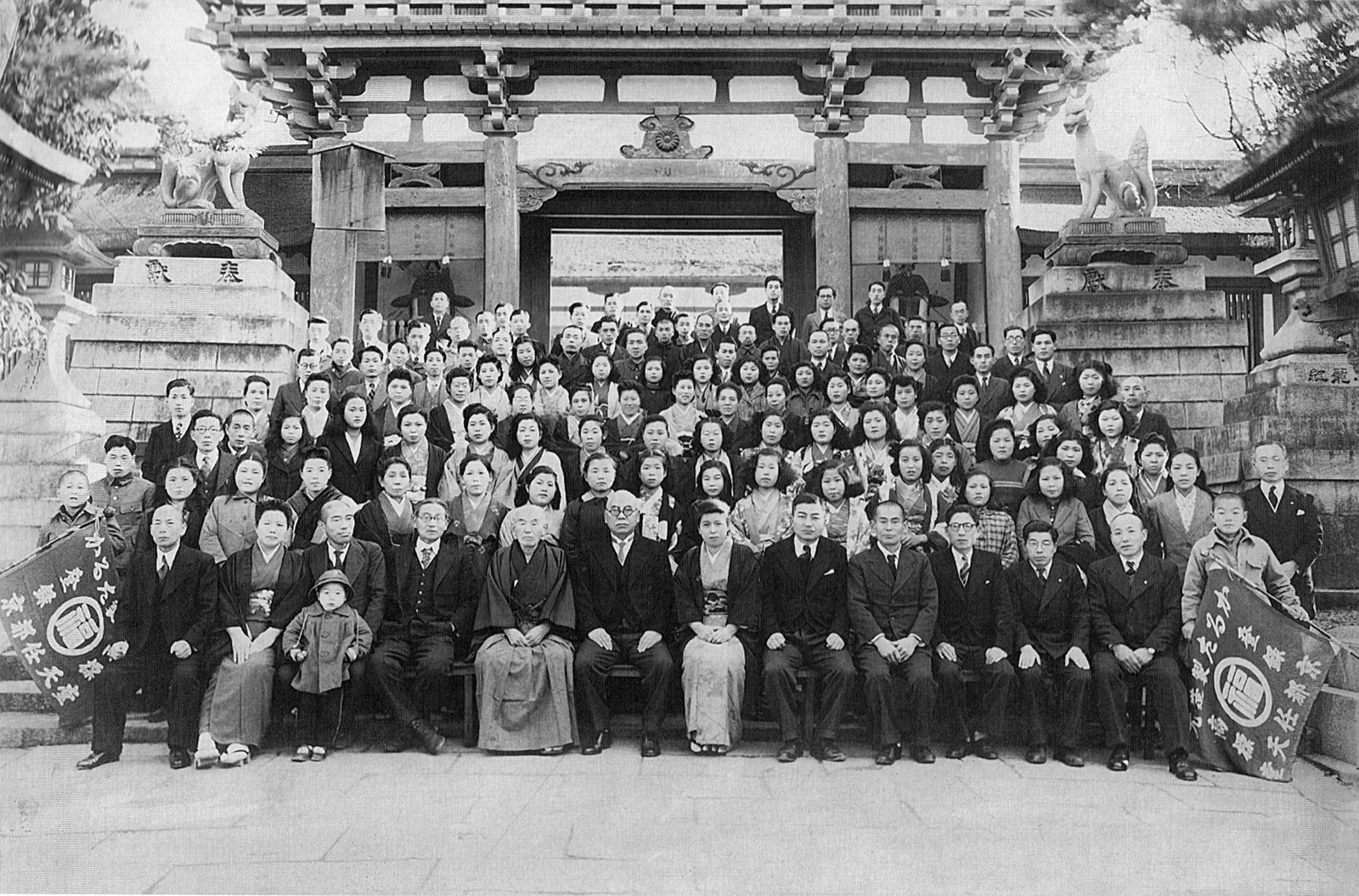
1949 New Year Nintendo staff commemoration

In 1950, due to Sekiryo's deteriorating health, Hiroshi Yamauchi assumed the presidency and headed manufacturing operations. His first actions involved several important changes in the operation of the company: in 1951, he changed the company name to Nintendo Playing Card Co., Ltd. (Note: 任天堂骨牌株式会社, Nintendō Karuta kabushiki gaisha) and in the following year, he centralized the manufacturing facilities dispersed in Kyoto, which led to the expansion of the offices in Kamitakamatsu-cho, Fukuine, Higashiyama-ku, Kyoto. In 1953, Nintendo became the first company to succeed in mass-producing plastic playing cards in Japan. Some of the company's employees, accustomed to more cautious and conservative leadership, viewed the new measures with concern, and the rising tension led to a call for a strike. However, the measure had no major impact, as Hiroshi resorted to the dismissal of several dissatisfied workers.

In 1959, Nintendo moved its headquarters to Kamitakamatsu-cho, Fukuine, Higashiyama-ku in Kyoto. The company entered into a partnership with Walt Disney Productions to incorporate its characters into playing cards, which opened it up to the children's market and resulted in a boost to Nintendo's playing card business. Nintendo automated the production of Japanese playing cards using backing paper, and also developed a distribution system that allowed it to offer its products in toy stores. By 1961, the company had established a Tokyo branch in Chiyoda, Tokyo, and sold more than 1.5 million card packs, holding a high market share, for which it relied on televised advertising campaigns. In 1962, Nintendo became a public company by listing stock on the second section of the Osaka Securities Exchange and the Kyoto Stock Exchange. In the following year, the company adopted its current name, Nintendo & Co., Ltd. (Note: 任天堂株式会社, Nintendō kabushiki gaisha) and started manufacturing games in addition to playing cards.

In 1964, Nintendo earned ¥150 million. Although the company experienced a period of economic prosperity, the Disney cards and derived products made it dependent on the children's market. The situation was exacerbated by the falling sales of its adult-oriented playing cards caused by Japanese society gravitating toward other hobbies such as pachinko, bowling, and nightly outings. When Disney card sales began to decline, Nintendo realized that it had no real alternative to alleviate the situation. After the 1964 Tokyo Olympics, Nintendo's stock price plummeted to its lowest recorded level of ¥60.

In 1965, Nintendo hired Gunpei Yokoi to maintain the assembly-line machines used to manufacture its playing cards.

==== 1969–1972: Classic and electronic toys ====
Yamauchi increased Nintendo's investment in a research and development department in 1969, directed by Hiroshi Imanishi, a long-time employee of the company. Yokoi was moved to the newly created department and was responsible for coordinating various projects. Yokoi's experience in manufacturing electronic devices led Yamauchi to put him in charge of the company's games department, and his products would be mass-produced. During that period, Nintendo built a new production plant in Uji, just outside of Kyoto, and distributed classic tabletop games like chess, shogi, go, and mahjong, and other foreign games under the Nippon Game brand. The company's restructuring preserved a couple of areas dedicated to playing card manufacturing.

In 1970, the company's stock listing was promoted to the first section of the Osaka Stock Exchange, and the reconstruction and enlargement of its corporate headquarters was completed. The year represented a watershed moment in Nintendo's history as it released Japan's first electronic toy—the Beam Gun, an optoelectronic pistol designed by Masayuki Uemura. In total, more than a million units were sold. Nintendo partnered with Magnavox to provide a light gun controller based on the Beam Gun design for the company's new home video game console, the Magnavox Odyssey, in 1971. Other popular toys released at the time included the Ultra Hand, the Ultra Machine, the Ultra Scope, and the Love Tester, all designed by Yokoi. More than 1.2 million units of Ultra Hand were sold in Japan.

=== 1973–present: History in electronics ===
Nintendo consoles release timeline
1977	Color TV-Game 6
1977	Color TV-Game 15
1978	Color TV-Game Racing 112
1979	Color TV-Game Block Kuzushi
1980	Game & Watch
1980	Computer TV-Game
1981–1982
1983	Famicom
1983	Computer Mah-jong Yakuman
1984
1985	NES
1986–1988
1989	Game Boy
1990	Super Famicom
1991	SNES
1992
1993	New Famicom
1993	New-Style NES
1994
1995	Virtual Boy
1996	Game Boy Pocket
1996	Nintendo 64
1997
1998	Game Boy Light
1998	Game Boy Color
1999–2000
2001	Game Boy Advance
2001	Nintendo GameCube
2001	Pokémon Mini
2001	Panasonic Q
2002
2003	Game Boy Advance SP
2004	Nintendo DS
2005	Game Boy Micro
2005	Game Boy Advance SP (AGS-101)
2006	Nintendo DS Lite
2006	Wii
2007
2008	Nintendo DSi
2009	Nintendo DSi XL
2010
2011	Nintendo 3DS
2011	Wii Family Edition
2012	Nintendo 3DS XL
2012	Wii U
2012	Wii Mini
2013	Nintendo 2DS
2014	New Nintendo 3DS
2014	New Nintendo 3DS XL
2015
2016	NES Classic Edition
2017	Nintendo Switch
2017	New Nintendo 2DS XL
2017	Super NES Classic Edition
2018
2019	Nintendo Switch Lite
2020	Game & Watch: Super Mario Bros.
2021	Nintendo Switch OLED
2021	Game & Watch: The Legend of Zelda
2022–2024
2025	Nintendo Switch 2

==== 1973–1978: Early video games and Color TV-Game ====
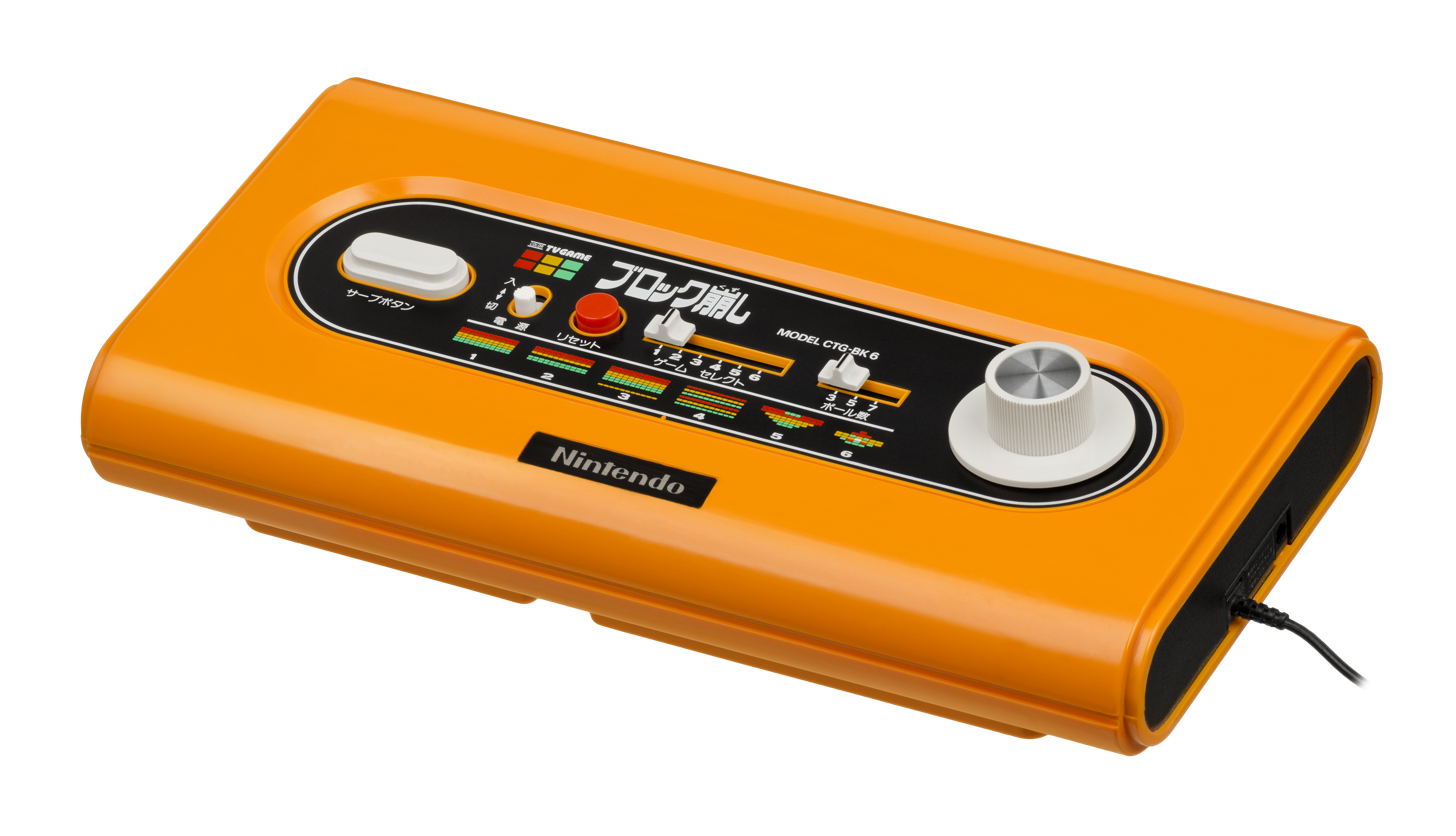
The Color TV-Game

The growing demand for Nintendo's products led Yamauchi to further expand the offices, for which he acquired the surrounding land and assigned the production of cards to the original Nintendo building. Meanwhile, Yokoi, Uemura, and new employees such as Genyo Takeda continued to develop innovative products for the company. The Laser Clay Shooting System was released in 1973 and managed to surpass bowling in popularity. Though Nintendo's toys continued to gain popularity, the 1973 oil crisis caused both a spike in the cost of plastics and a change in consumer priorities that put essential products over pastimes, and Nintendo lost several billion yen.

In 1974, Nintendo released Wild Gunman, a skeet shooting arcade simulation consisting of a 16 mm image projector with a sensor that detects a beam from the player's light gun. Both the Laser Clay Shooting System and Wild Gunman were successfully exported to Europe and North America. However, Nintendo's production speeds were still slow compared to rival companies such as Bandai and Tomy, and their prices were high, which led to the discontinuation of some of their light gun products. The subsidiary Nintendo Leisure System Co., Ltd., which developed these products, was closed as a result of the economic impact dealt by the oil crisis.

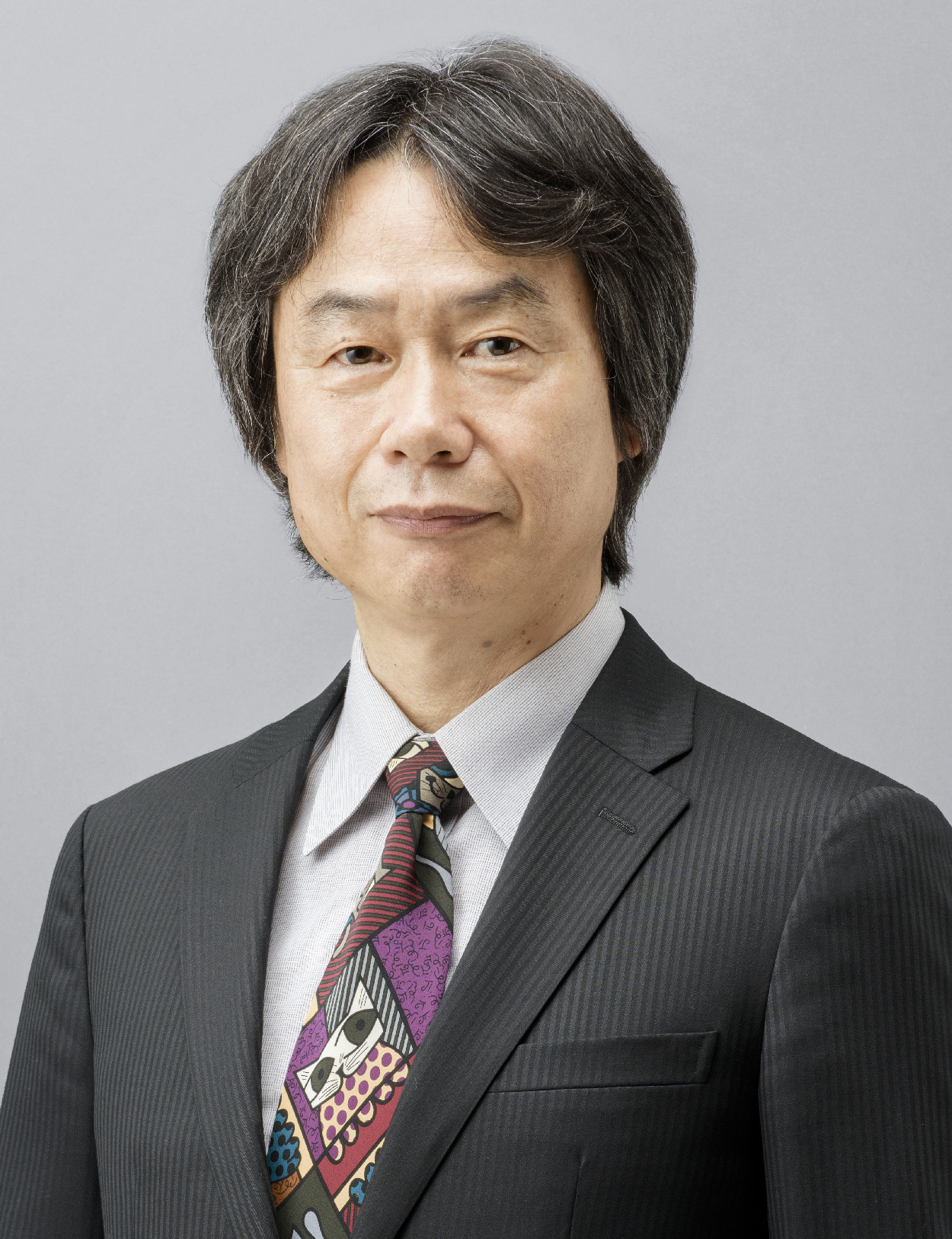
Shigeru Miyamoto joined Nintendo in 1977.

Yamauchi, motivated by the successes of Atari and Magnavox with their video game consoles, acquired the Japanese distribution rights for the Magnavox Odyssey in 1974, and reached an agreement with Mitsubishi Electric to develop similar products between 1975 and 1978, including the first microprocessor for video games systems, the Color TV-Game series, and an arcade game inspired by Othello. During this period, Takeda developed the video game EVR Race, and Shigeru Miyamoto joined Yokoi's team with the responsibility of designing the casing for the Color TV-Game consoles. In 1978, Nintendo's research and development department was split into two facilities, Nintendo Research & Development 1 and Nintendo Research & Development 2, respectively managed by Yokoi and Uemura.

Shigeru Miyamoto brought distinctive sources of inspiration to the company, ranging from the natural environment and regional culture of Sonobe, to popular culture influences like Westerns and detective fiction, and to folk Shinto practices and family media. They are seen in most of Nintendo's major franchises which developed following Miyamoto's creative leadership.

==== 1979–1987: Game & Watch, arcade games, and Nintendo Entertainment System ====
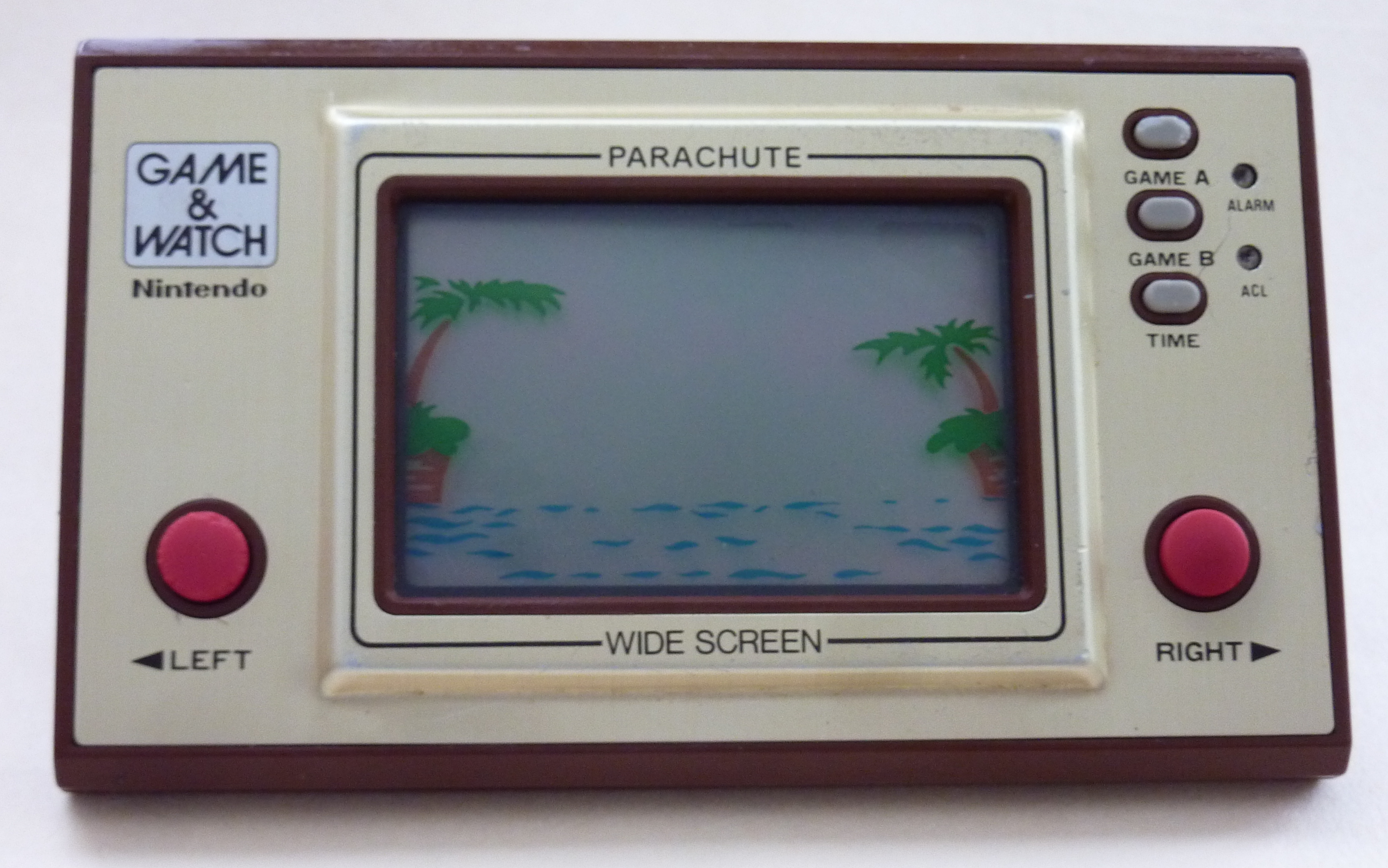
Game & Watch

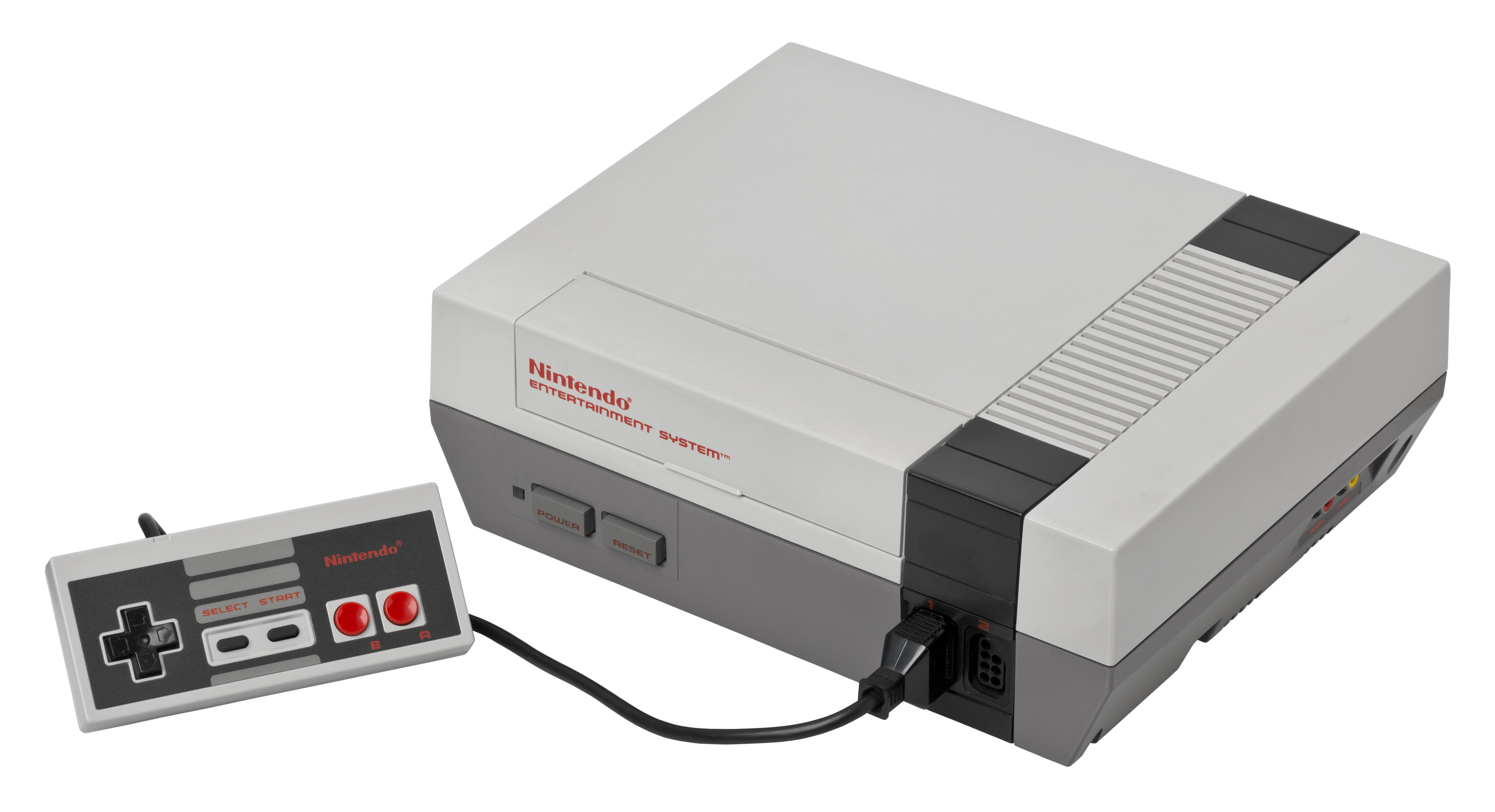
Nintendo Entertainment System

By the late 1970s, Nintendo was struggling financially. Two key events in Nintendo's history occurred in 1979: its American subsidiary was opened in New York City, and a new department focused on arcade game development was created. In 1980, one of the first handheld video game systems, the Game & Watch, was created by Yokoi from the technology used in portable calculators. It became one of Nintendo's most successful products, with over 43.4 million units sold worldwide during its production period, and for which 59 games were made in total. The success of Game & Watch led Yamauchi to shift the company towards more electronic games in the years that followed.

Nintendo entered the arcade video game market with Sheriff and Radar Scope, released in Japan in 1979 and 1980 respectively. Sheriff, also known as Bandido in some regions, marked the first original video game made by Nintendo, and was published by Sega and developed by Genyo Takeda and Shigeru Miyamoto. Radar Scope rivaled Galaxian in Japanese arcades but failed to find an audience overseas and created a financial crisis for the company. To try to find a more successful game, they put Miyamoto in charge of their next arcade game design, leading to the release of Donkey Kong in 1981, one of the first platform video games that allowed the player character to jump. The character Jumpman would later become Mario and Nintendo's official mascot. Mario was named after Mario Segale, the landlord of Nintendo's offices in Tukwila, Washington. Donkey Kong was a financial success for Nintendo both in Japan and overseas, and led Coleco to fight Atari for licensing rights for porting to home consoles and personal computers.

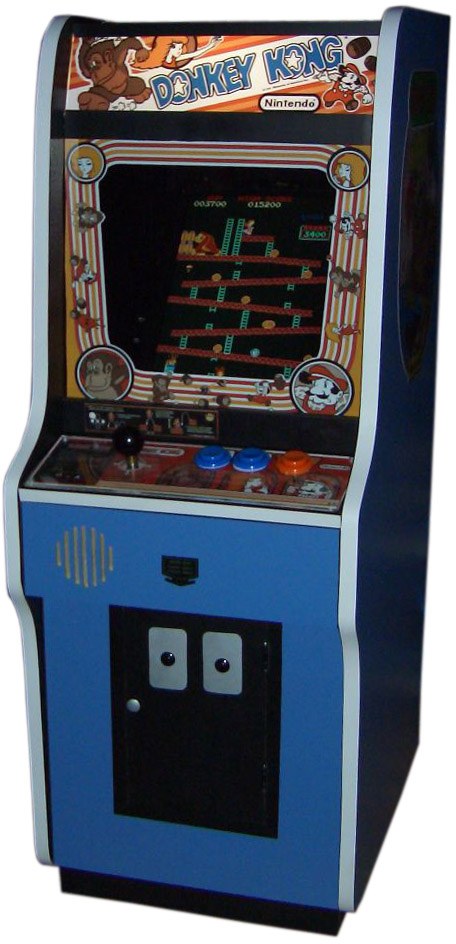
Donkey Kong miniature arcade cabinet

In 1983, Nintendo opened a new production facility in Uji and was listed in the first section of the Tokyo Stock Exchange. Uemura, taking inspiration from the ColecoVision, began creating a new video game console that would incorporate a ROM cartridge format for video games as well as both a central processing unit and a picture processing unit. The Family Computer, or Famicom, was released in Japan in July 1983 along with three games adapted from their original arcade versions: Donkey Kong, Donkey Kong Jr. and Popeye. Its success was such that in 1984, it surpassed the market share held by Sega's SG-1000. That success also led to Nintendo leaving the Japanese arcade market in late 1985. At this time, Nintendo adopted a series of guidelines that involved the validation of each game produced for the Famicom before its distribution on the market, agreements with developers to ensure that no Famicom game would be adapted to other consoles within two years of its release, and restricting developers from producing more than five games per year for the Famicom.

In the early 1980s, several video game consoles proliferated in the United States, as well as low-quality games produced by third-party developers, which oversaturated the market and led to the video game crash of 1983. Consequently, a recession hit the American video game industry, whose revenues went from over $3 billion to $100 million between 1983 and 1985. Nintendo's initiative to launch the Famicom in America was also impacted. To differentiate the Famicom from its competitors in America, Nintendo rebranded it as an entertainment system and its cartridges as Game Paks, with a design reminiscent of a VCR. Nintendo implemented a lockout chip in the Game Paks for control on its third party library to avoid the market saturation that had occurred in the United States. The result is the Nintendo Entertainment System, or NES, which was released in North America in 1985. The landmark games Super Mario Bros. and The Legend of Zelda were produced by Miyamoto and Takashi Tezuka. Composer Koji Kondo reinforced the idea that musical themes could act as a complement to game mechanics rather than simply a miscellaneous element. Production of the NES lasted until 1995, and production of the Famicom lasted until 2003. In total, around 62 million Famicom and NES consoles were sold worldwide. During this period, Nintendo created its Official Seal of Quality, added to their products so that customers recognized authentic Nintendo products compared to bootleg cartridges that required unusual means to play as to bypass the NES lockout chip. By this time, Nintendo's network of electronic suppliers had extended to around thirty companies, including Ricoh (Nintendo's main source for semiconductors) and the Sharp Corporation.

==== 1988–1994: Game Boy and Super Nintendo Entertainment System ====
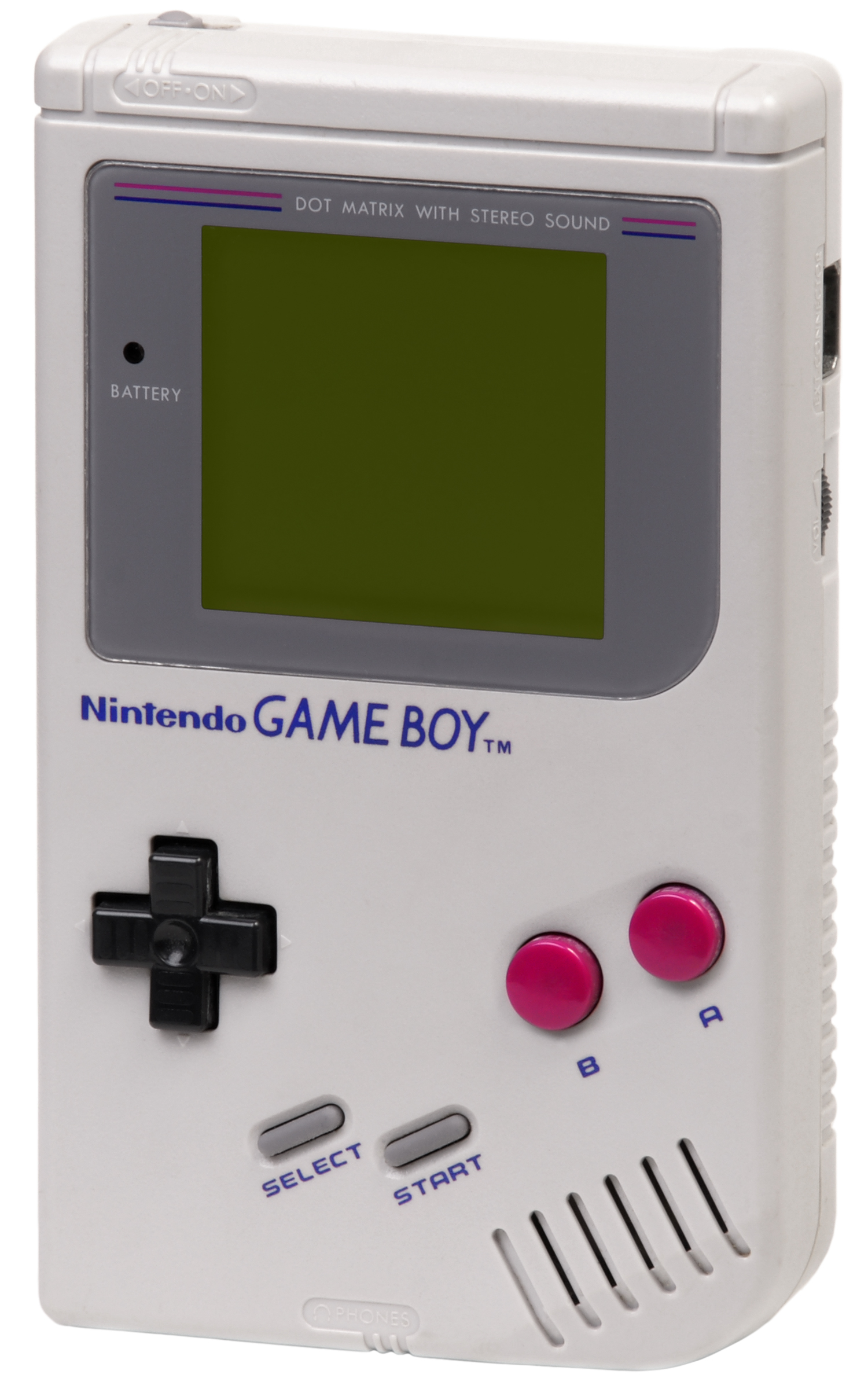
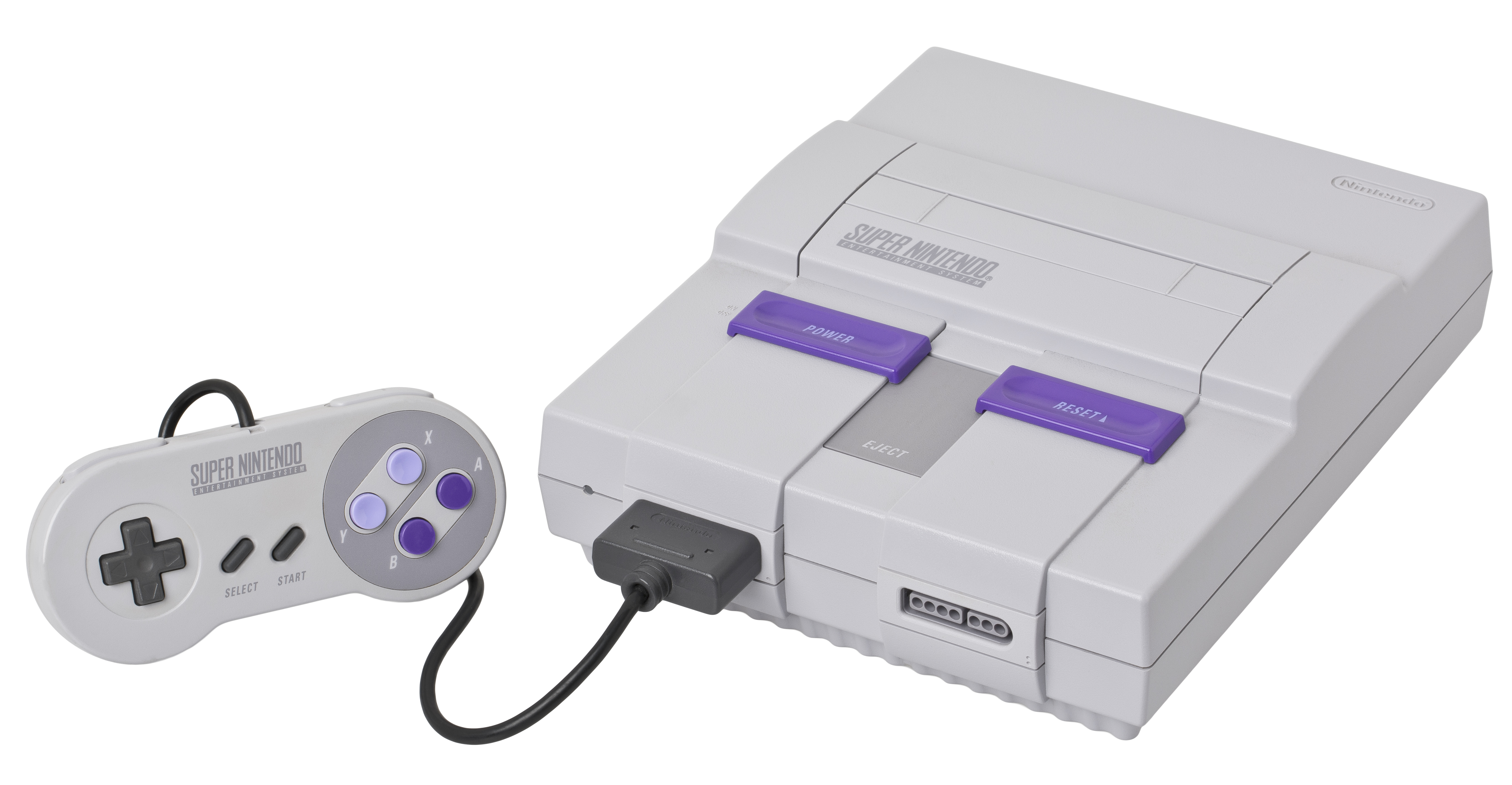
The Game Boy and Super NES

In 1988, Yokoi and his team at Nintendo R&D1 conceived the Game Boy, the first handheld video game console made by Nintendo. Nintendo released the Game Boy in 1989. In North America, the Game Boy was bundled with the popular third-party game Tetris after a difficult negotiation process with Elektronorgtechnica. The Game Boy was a significant success. In its first two weeks of sale in Japan, its initial inventory of 300,000 units sold out, and in the United States, an additional 40,000 units were sold on its first day of distribution. Around this time, Nintendo entered an agreement with Sony to develop the Super Famicom CD-ROM Adapter, a peripheral for the upcoming Super Famicom capable of playing CD-ROMs. However, the collaboration did not last as Yamauchi preferred to continue developing the technology with Philips, which would result in the CD-i, and Sony's independent efforts resulted in the creation of the PlayStation console.

The first issue of Nintendo Power magazine, which had an annual circulation of 1.5 million copies in the United States, was published in 1988. In July 1989, Nintendo held the first Nintendo Space World trade show with the name Shoshinkai to announce and demonstrate upcoming Nintendo products. That year, the first World of Nintendo stores-within-a-store, which carried official Nintendo merchandise, were opened in the United States. According to company information, more than 25% of homes in the United States had an NES in 1989.

In the late 1980s, Nintendo's dominance slipped with the appearance of NEC's PC Engine/TurboGrafx-16 and Sega's Mega Drive/Genesis, 16-bit game consoles with improved graphics and audio compared to the NES. In response to the competition, Uemura designed the Super Famicom, which launched in 1990. The first batch of 300,000 consoles sold out in hours. The following year, as with the NES, Nintendo distributed a modified version of the Super Famicom to the United States market, titled the Super Nintendo Entertainment System. Launch games for the Super Famicom and Super NES include Super Mario World, F-Zero, Pilotwings, SimCity, and Gradius III. By mid-1992, over 46 million Super Famicom and Super NES consoles had been sold. The console's life cycle lasted until 1999 in the United States, and until 2003 in Japan.

In March 1990, the first Nintendo World Championship was held, with participants from 29 American cities competing for the title of "best Nintendo player in the world". In June 1990, the subsidiary Nintendo of Europe was opened in Großostheim, Germany; in 1993, subsequent subsidiaries were established in the Netherlands (where Bandai had previously distributed Nintendo's products), France, the United Kingdom, Spain, Belgium, and Australia. In 1992, Nintendo acquired a majority stake in the Seattle Mariners baseball team, and sold most of its shares in 2016. On 31 July 1992, Nintendo of America announced it would cease manufacturing arcade games and systems. In 1993, Star Fox was released, which marked an industry milestone by being the first video game to make use of the Super FX chip.

The proliferation of graphically violent video games, such as Mortal Kombat, caused controversy and led to the creation of the Interactive Digital Software Association and the Entertainment Software Rating Board, in whose development Nintendo collaborated during 1994. These measures also encouraged Nintendo to abandon the content guidelines it enforced since the release of the NES. Commercial strategies implemented by Nintendo during this time include the Nintendo Gateway System, an in-flight entertainment service available for airlines, cruise ships and hotels, and the "Play It Loud!" advertising campaign for Game Boys with different-colored casings. The Advanced Computer Modeling graphics used in Donkey Kong Country for the Super NES and Donkey Kong Land for the Game Boy were technologically innovative, as was the Satellaview satellite modem peripheral for the Super Famicom, which allowed the digital transmission of data via a communications satellite in space.

==== 1995–2000: Virtual Boy, Nintendo 64, and Game Boy Color ====
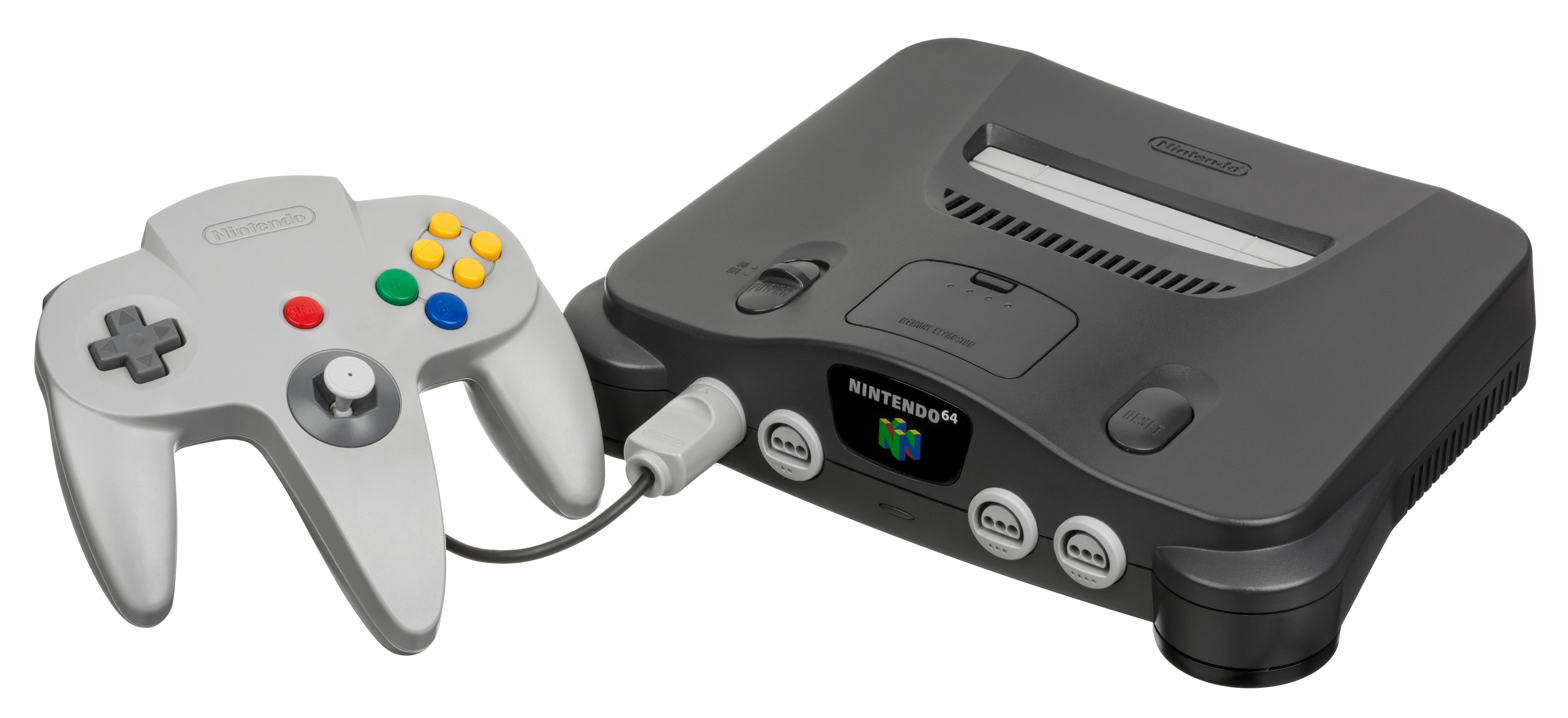
Nintendo 64, released in 1996

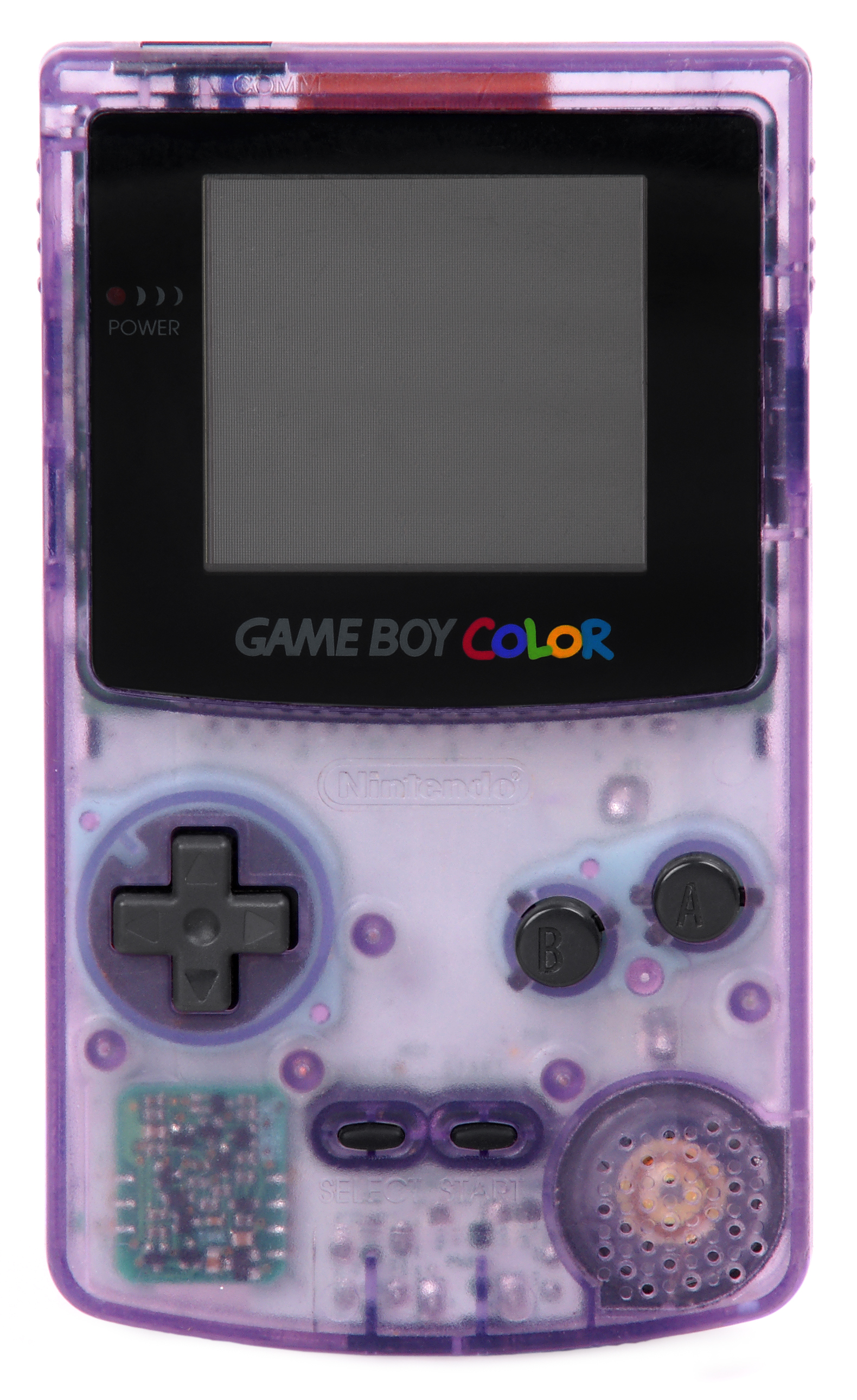
Game Boy Color, released in 1998

In 1995, Nintendo released the Virtual Boy, a console designed by Yokoi with stereoscopic graphics. Critics were generally disappointed with the quality of the games and red-colored graphics, and complained of gameplay-induced headaches. The system sold poorly and was quietly discontinued. Amid the system's failure, Yokoi formally retired from Nintendo.

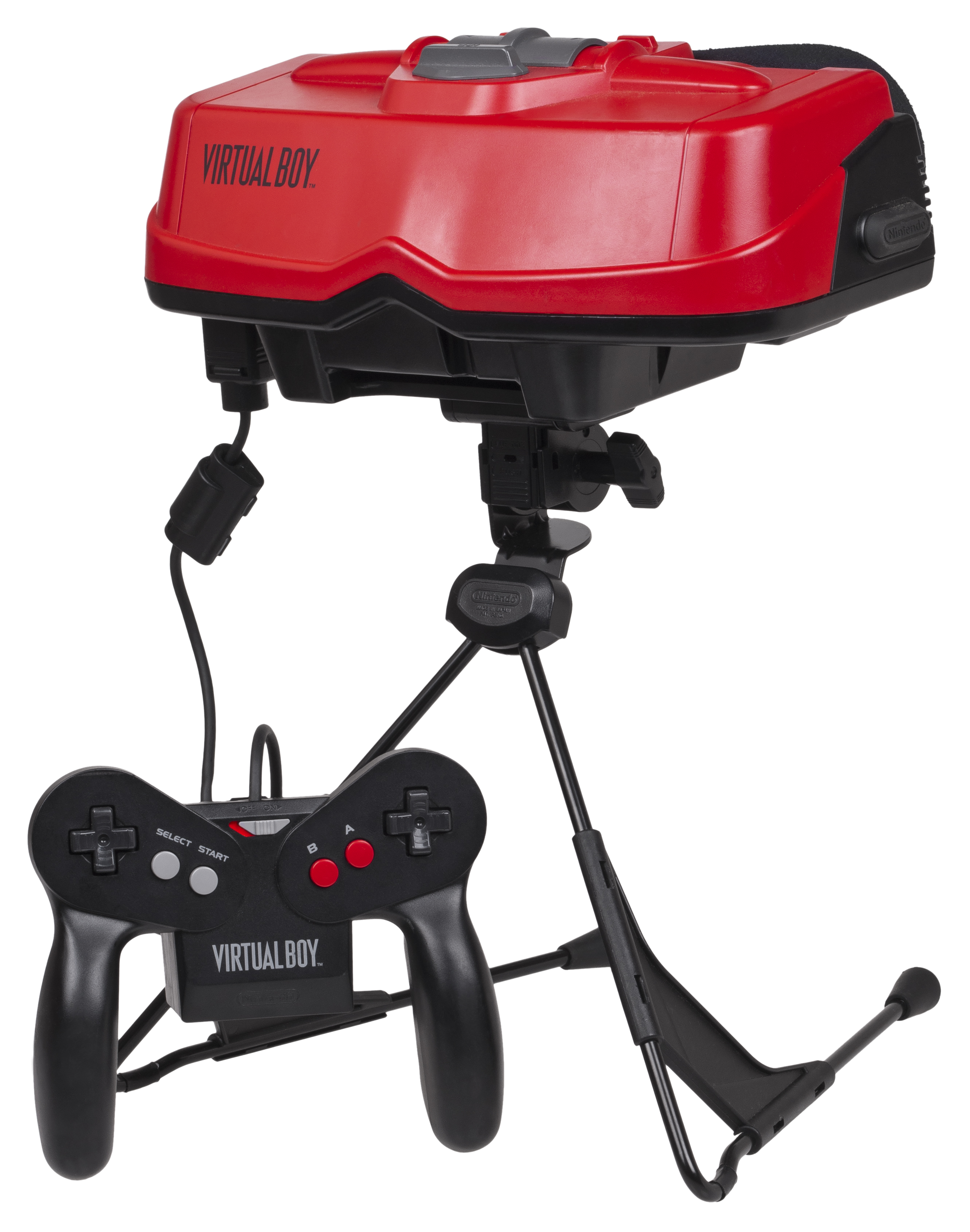
Virtual Boy, released in 1995

In February 1996, Pocket Monsters Red and Green (known internationally as Pokémon Red and Blue) was developed by Game Freak and released in Japan for the Game Boy, establishing the popular Pokémon franchise. The game went on to sell 31.37 million units, with the video game series exceeding a total of 300 million units in sales as of 2017.

The Nintendo 64 was released in June 1996 in Japan, September 1996 in the United States and March 1997 in Europe. Though planned for release in 1995, the production schedules of third-party developers influenced a delay. The console had been in development since mid-1993, when Nintendo and Silicon Graphics announced a strategic alliance to develop the console. NEC, Toshiba, and Sharp also contributed technology to the console. The Nintendo 64 was marketed as one of the first consoles to be designed with 64-bit architecture. In 1997, Nintendo released the Rumble Pak, a plug-in device that connects to the Nintendo 64 controller and produces a vibration during certain moments of a game. By the end of its production in 2002, around 33 million Nintendo 64 consoles were sold worldwide, and it is considered one of the most recognized video game systems in history. 388 games were produced for the Nintendo 64 in total, some of which – particularly Super Mario 64, The Legend of Zelda: Ocarina of Time, and GoldenEye 007 – have been distinguished as some of the greatest of all time.

In 1998, the Game Boy Color was released. In addition to backward compatibility with Game Boy games, the console's similar capacity to the NES resulted in select adaptations of games from that library, such as Super Mario Bros. Deluxe. Since then, over 118.6 million Game Boy and Game Boy Color consoles have been sold worldwide.

A series of administrative changes occurred in 2000 when Nintendo's corporate offices were moved to the Minami-ku neighborhood in Kyoto, and Nintendo Benelux was established to manage the Dutch and Belgian territories.

==== 2001–2003: Game Boy Advance and GameCube ====
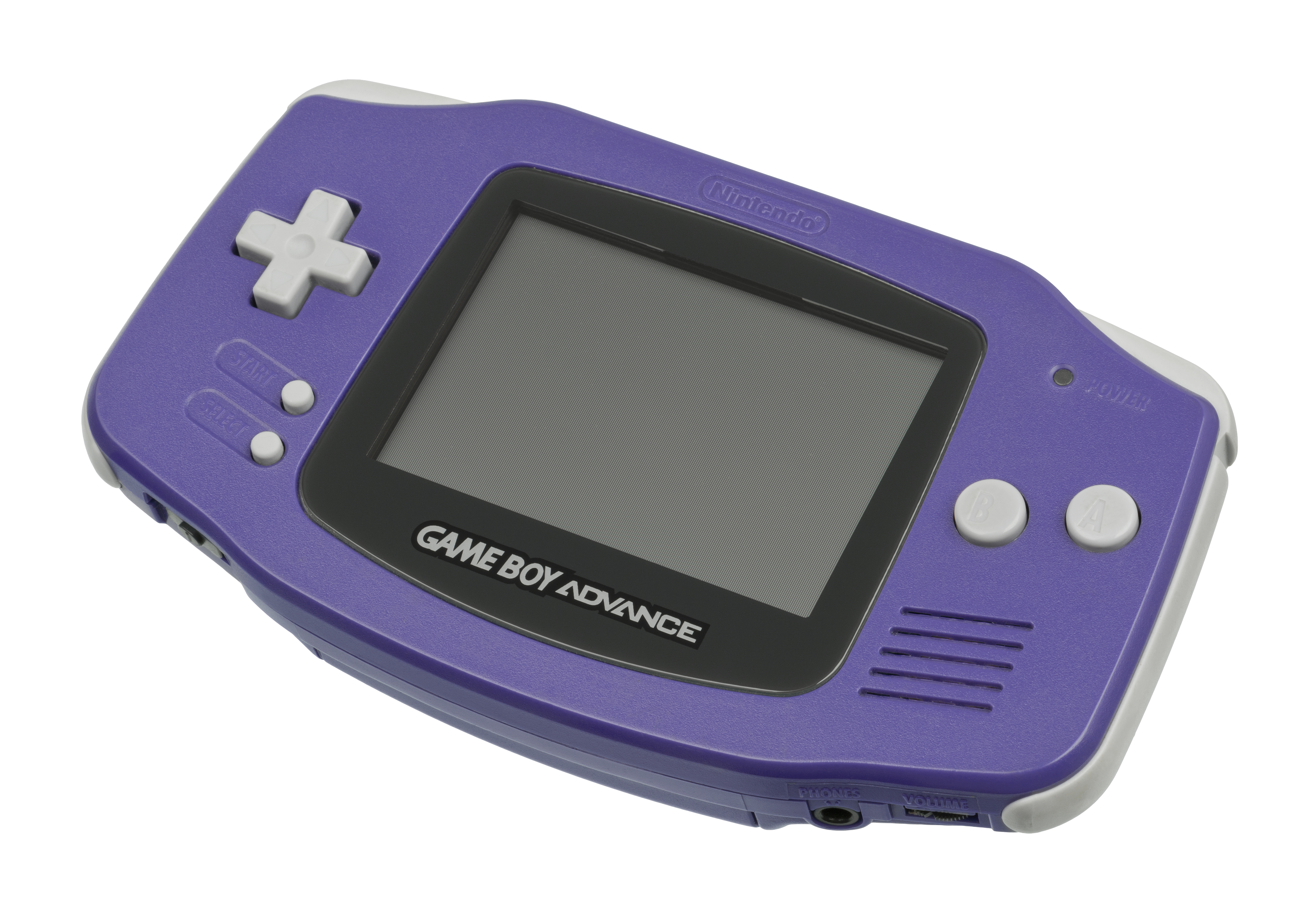
Game Boy Advance, released in 2001

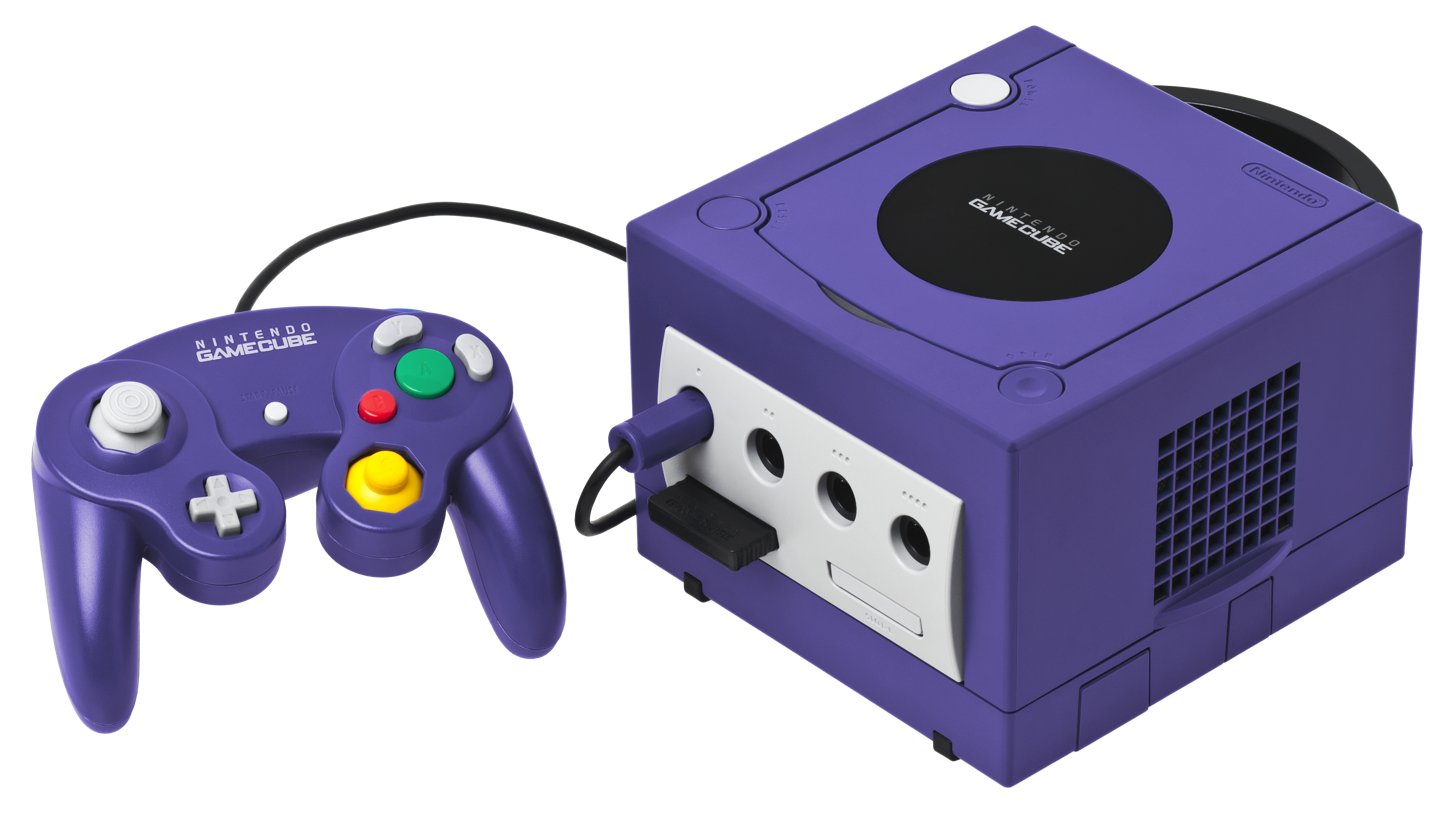
GameCube, released in 2001

In 2001, two new Nintendo consoles were introduced: the Game Boy Advance, which was designed by Gwénaël Nicolas with stylistic departure from its predecessors, and the GameCube, which features a 128-bit Gekko processor from IBM and a DVD drive from Panasonic. During the first week of the Game Boy Advance's North American release in June 2001, over 500,000 units were sold, making it the fastest-selling video game console in the United States at the time. By the end of its production cycle in 2010, more than 81.5 million units had been sold worldwide. As for the GameCube, even with such distinguishing features as the miniDVD format of its games and Internet connectivity for a few games, its sales were lower than those of its predecessors, and during the six years of its production, 21.7 million units were sold worldwide. The GameCube struggled against its rivals in the market, and its initial poor sales led to Nintendo posting a first half fiscal year loss in 2003 for the first time since the company went public in 1962.

Satoru Iwata was Nintendo president from 2002–2015.

In 2002, the Pokémon Mini was released. Its dimensions were smaller than that of the Game Boy Advance and it weighed 70 grams, making it the smallest video game console in history. Nintendo collaborated with Sega and Namco to develop Triforce, an arcade board to facilitate the conversion of arcade titles to the GameCube. Following the European release of the GameCube in May 2002, Hiroshi Yamauchi announced his resignation as the president of Nintendo, and Satoru Iwata was selected by the company as his successor. Yamauchi would remain as advisor and director of the company until 2005. Iwata's appointment as president ended the Yamauchi succession at the helm of the company, a practice that had been in place since its foundation.

In 2003, Nintendo released the Game Boy Advance SP, an improved version of the Game Boy Advance with a foldable case, an illuminated display, and a rechargeable battery. By the end of its production cycle in 2010, over 43.5 million units had been sold worldwide. Nintendo also released the Game Boy Player, a peripheral that allows Game Boy and Game Boy Advance games to be played on the GameCube.

==== 2004–2010: Nintendo DS and Wii ====
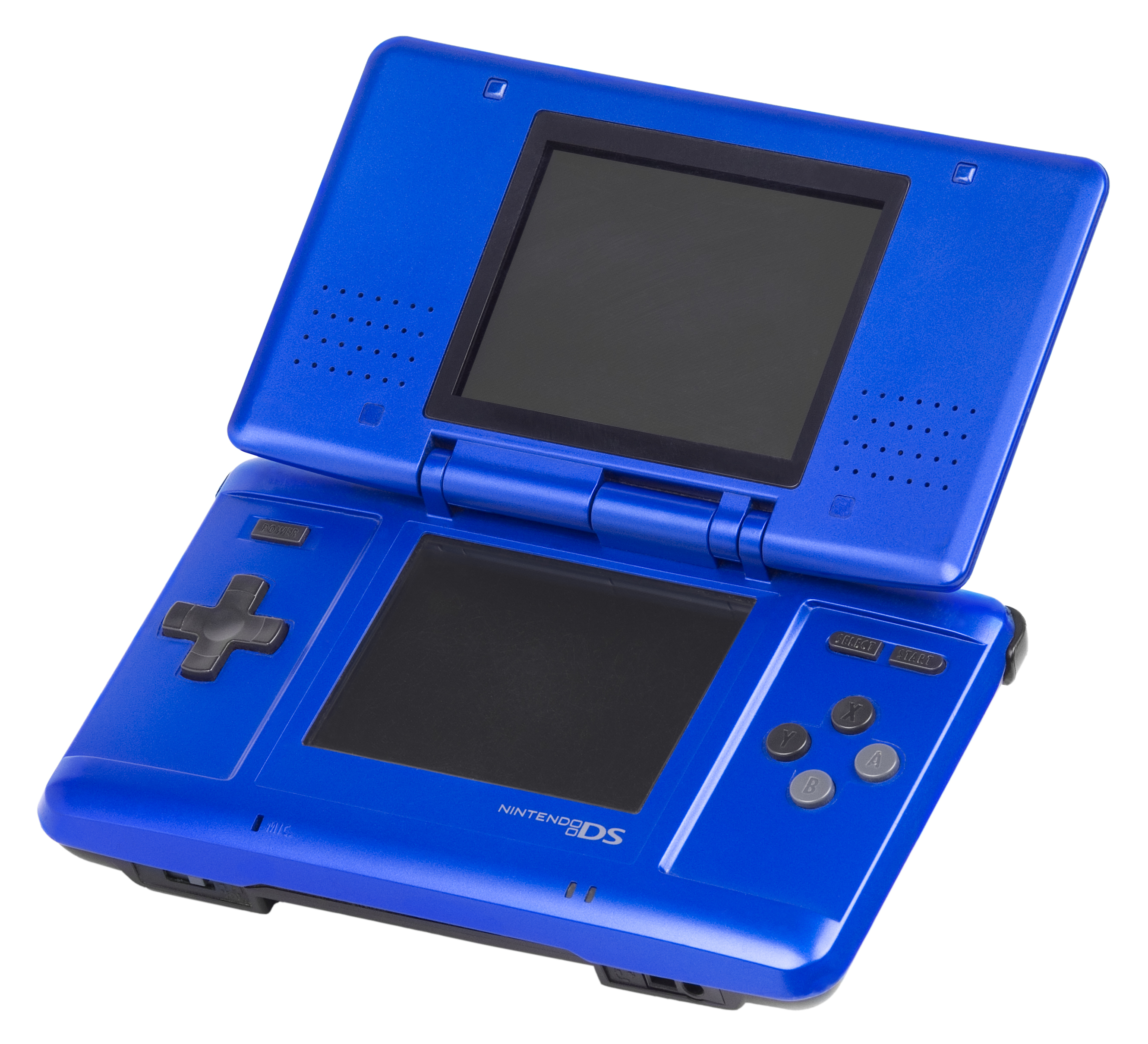
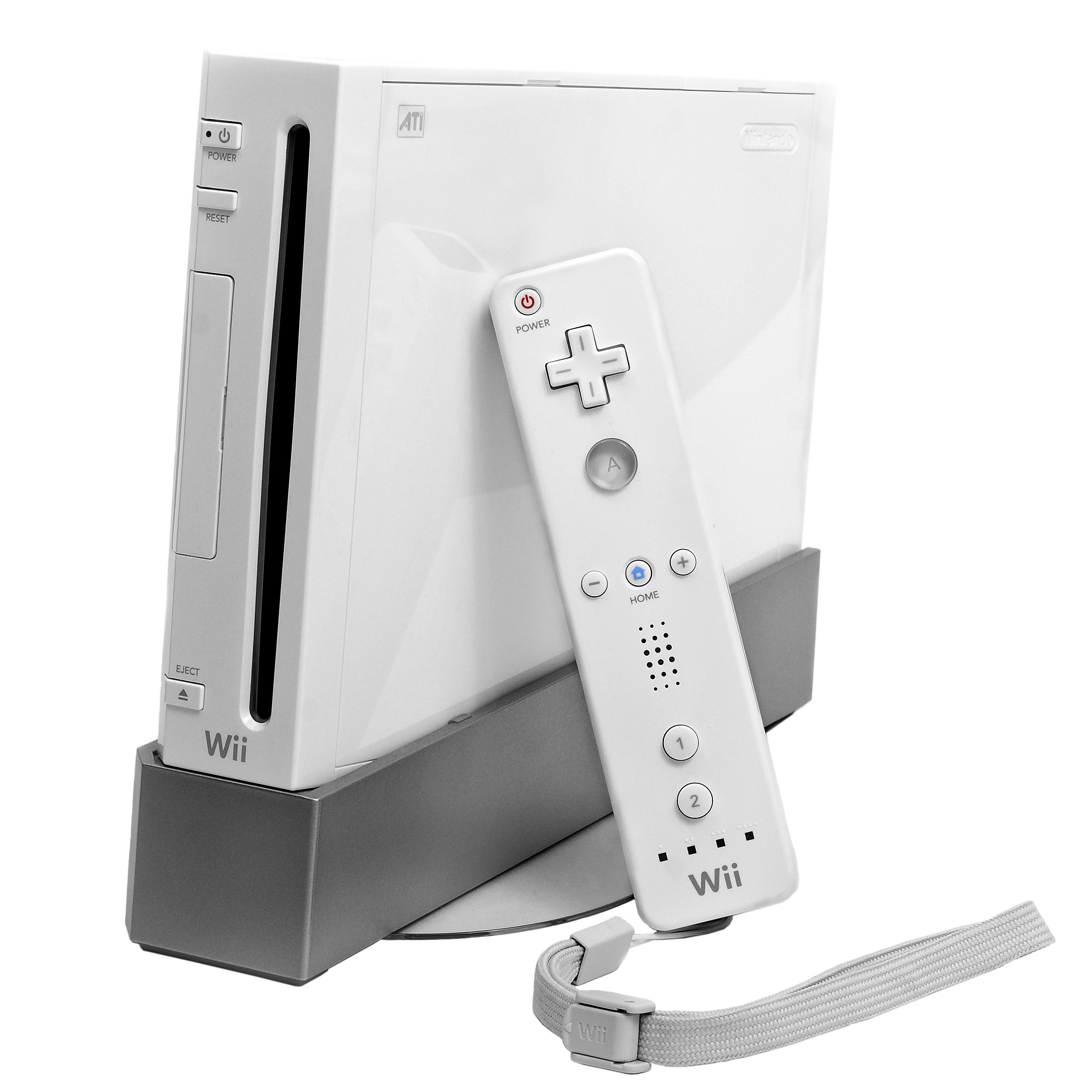
The Nintendo DS and Wii

In 2004, Nintendo released the Nintendo DS, which featured such innovations as dual screens – one of which is a touchscreen – and wireless connectivity for multiplayer play. Throughout its lifetime, more than 154 million units were sold, making it the most successful handheld console and the second bestselling console in history. In 2005, Nintendo released the Game Boy Micro, the last system in the Game Boy line. Sales did not meet Nintendo's expectations, with 2.5 million units being sold by 2007. In mid-2005, the Nintendo World Store was inaugurated in New York City.

Reggie Fils-Aimé was the president of Nintendo of America from 2006–2019.

Nintendo's next home console was conceived in 2001, although development commenced in 2003, taking inspiration from the Nintendo DS. Nintendo also considered the relative failure of the GameCube and instead opted to take a "Blue Ocean Strategy" by developing a reduced performance console in contrast to the high-performance consoles of Sony and Microsoft to avoid directly competing with them. The Wii was released in November 2006, with a total of 33 launch games. With the Wii, Nintendo sought to reach a broader demographic than its seventh-generation competitors, with the intention of also encompassing the "non-consumer" sector. Nintendo invested in a $200 million advertising campaign to that end. The Wii's innovations include the Wii Remote controller, equipped with an accelerometer system and infrared sensors that allow it to detect its position in a three-dimensional environment with the aid of a sensor bar; the Nunchuk peripheral that includes an analog controller and an accelerometer; and the Wii MotionPlus expansion that increases the sensitivity of the main controller with the aid of gyroscopes. By 2016, more than 101 million Wii consoles had been sold worldwide, making it the most successful console of its generation, a distinction that Nintendo had not achieved since the 1990s with the Super NES.

Several accessories were released for the Wii from 2007 to 2010, such as the Wii Balance Board, the Wii Wheel and the WiiWare download service. In 2009, Nintendo Iberica S.A. expanded its commercial operations to Portugal through a new office in Lisbon. By that year, Nintendo held a 68.3% share of the worldwide handheld gaming market.

==== 2011–2016: Nintendo 3DS, Wii U, and mobile ventures ====
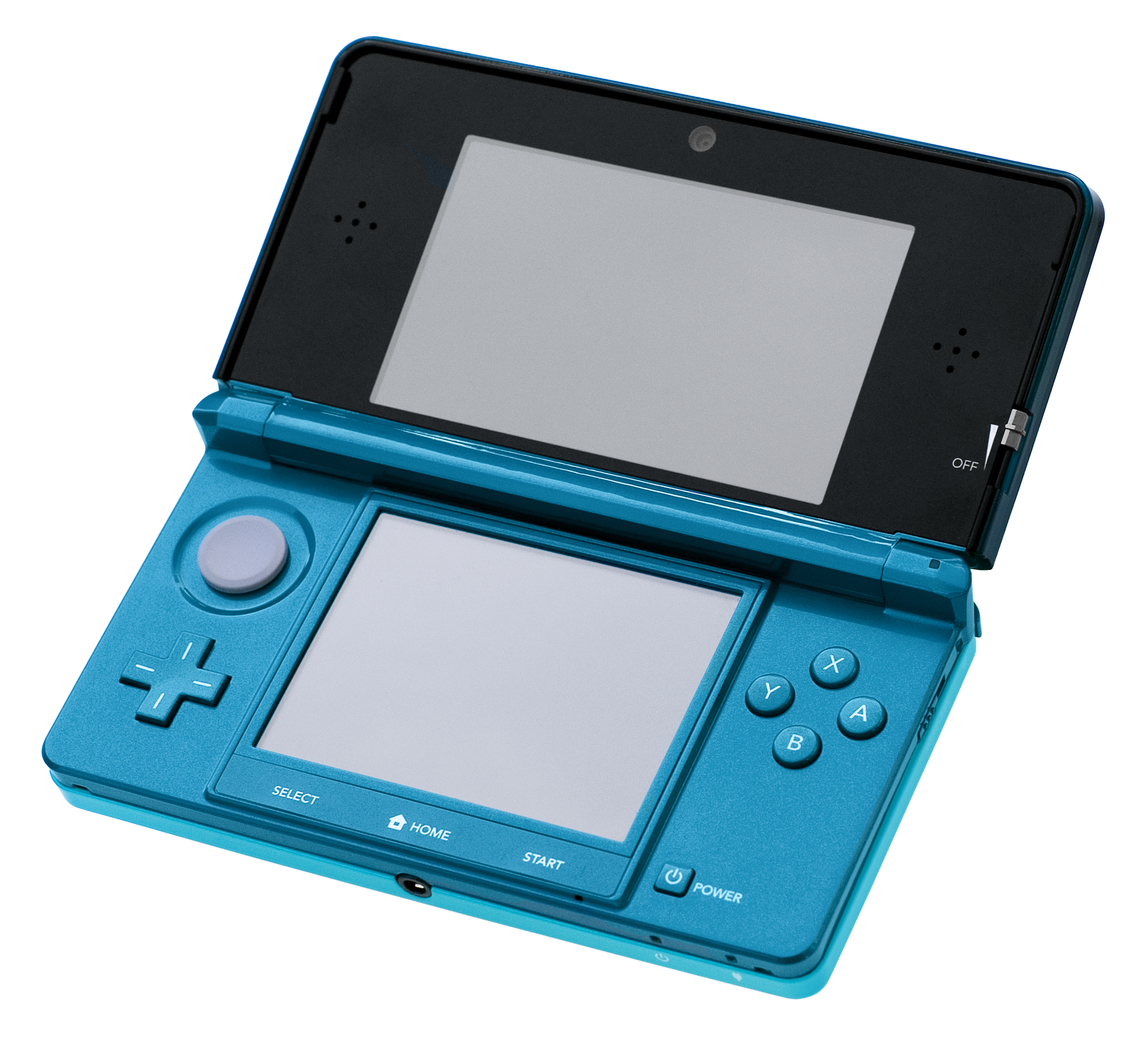
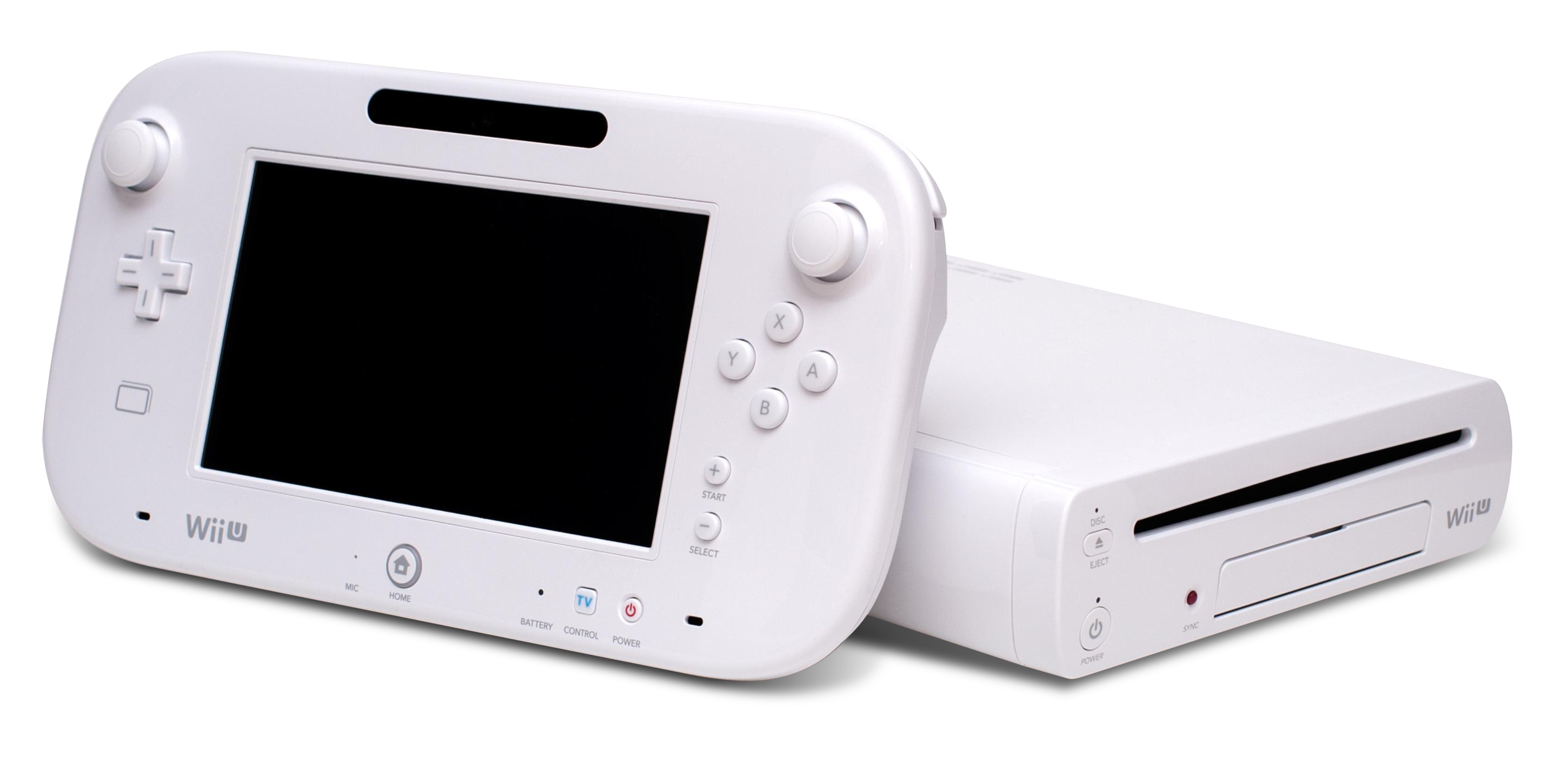
The Nintendo 3DS and Wii U

After an announcement in March 2010, Nintendo released the Nintendo 3DS in 2011. The console produces stereoscopic effects without 3D glasses. By 2018, more than 69 million units had been sold worldwide; the figure increased to 75 million by the start of 2019.

In 2012 and 2013, two new Nintendo game consoles were introduced: the Wii U, with high-definition graphics and a GamePad controller with near-field communication technology, and the Nintendo 2DS, a version of the 3DS that lacks the clamshell design of Nintendo's previous handheld consoles and the stereoscopic effects of the 3DS. With 13.5 million units sold worldwide, the Wii U is the least successful video game console in Nintendo's history. In 2014, a new product line was released consisting of figures of Nintendo characters called Amiibos.

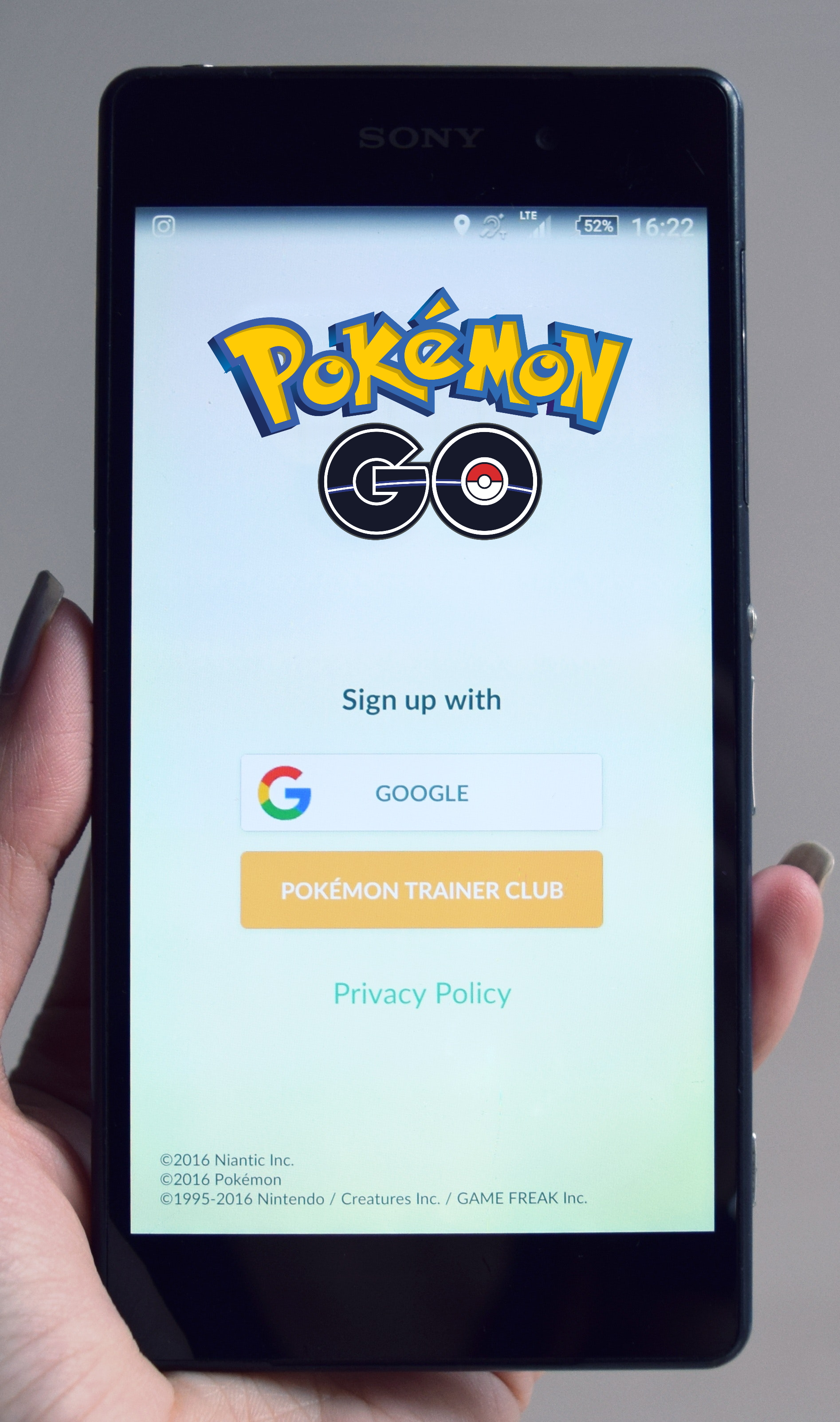
Pokémon Go in the sign-up menu

On 25 September 2013, Nintendo announced its acquisition of a 28% stake in PUX Corporation, a subsidiary of Panasonic, to develop facial, voice, and text recognition for its video games. Due to a 30% decrease in company income between April and December 2013, Iwata announced a temporary 50% cut to his salary, with other executives seeing reductions by 20%–30%. In January 2015, Nintendo ceased operations in the Brazilian market due in part to high import duties. This did not affect the rest of Nintendo's Latin American market due to an alliance with Juegos de Video Latinoamérica. Nintendo reached an agreement with NC Games for Nintendo's products to resume distribution in Brazil by 2017, and by September 2020, the Switch was released in Brazil.

On 11 July 2015, Iwata died of bile duct cancer, and after a couple of months in which Miyamoto and Takeda jointly operated the company, Tatsumi Kimishima was named as Iwata's successor on 16 September 2015. As part of the management's restructuring, Miyamoto and Takeda were named creative and technological advisors, respectively. The financial losses caused by the Wii U, along with Sony's intention to release its video games to other platforms such as smart TVs, motivated Nintendo to rethink its strategy concerning the production and distribution of its properties. In 2015, Nintendo formalized agreements with DeNA and Universal Parks & Resorts to extend its presence to smart devices and amusement parks respectively.

In March 2016, Nintendo's first mobile app for the iOS and Android systems, Miitomo, was released. Since then, Nintendo has produced other similar apps, such as Super Mario Run, Fire Emblem Heroes, Animal Crossing: Pocket Camp, Mario Kart Tour, and Pokémon Go, the last being developed by Niantic and having generated $115 million in revenue for Nintendo. In March 2016, the loyalty program My Nintendo replaced Club Nintendo. The NES Classic Edition was released in November 2016. The console is a version of the NES based on emulation, HDMI, and the Wii remote. Its successor, the Super NES Classic Edition, was released in September 2017. By October 2018, around ten million units of both consoles combined had been sold worldwide.

==== 2017–2024: Nintendo Switch and expansion to other media ====
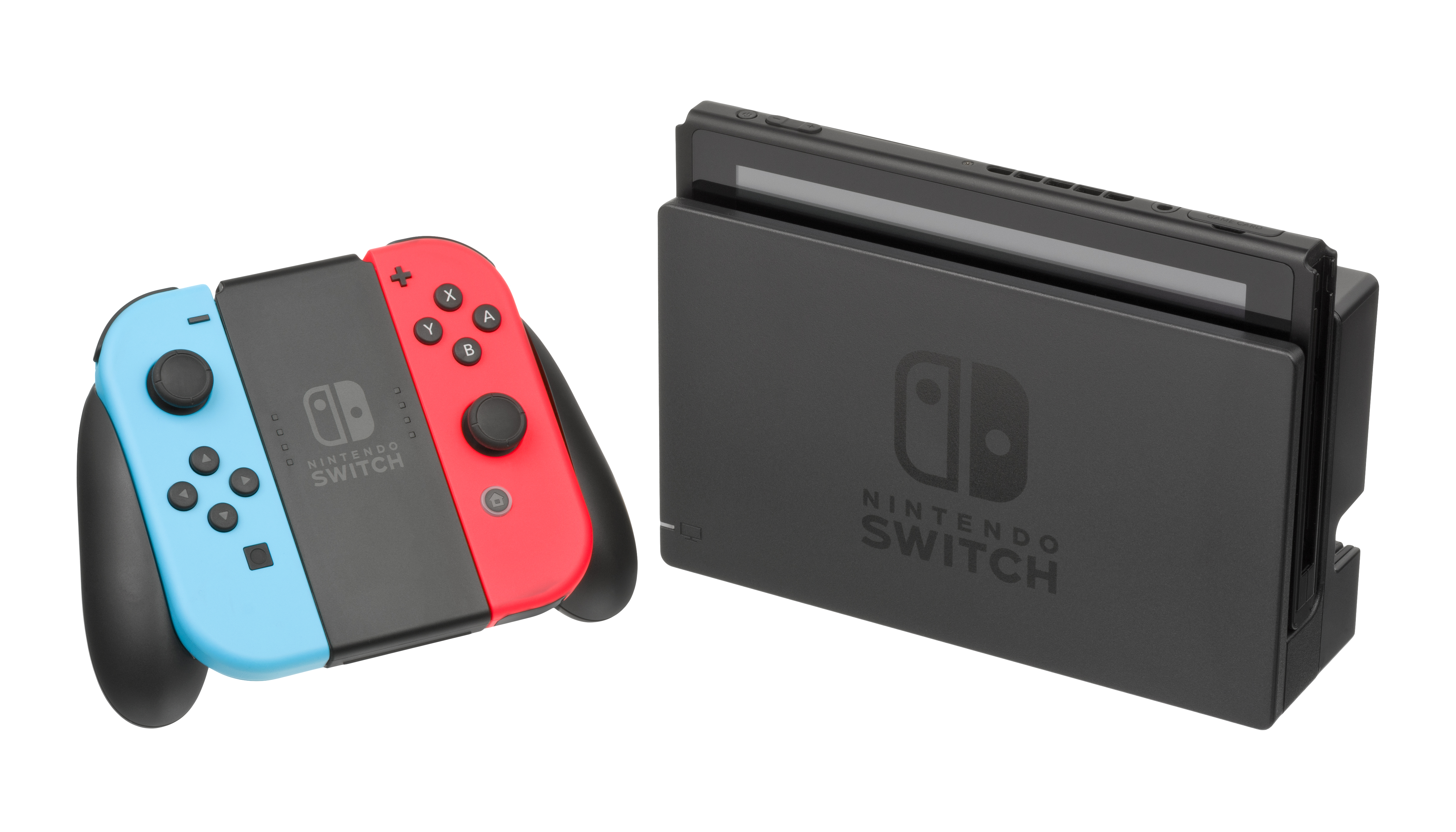
In "TV mode", with the Joy-Con attached to a grip and the main unit docked

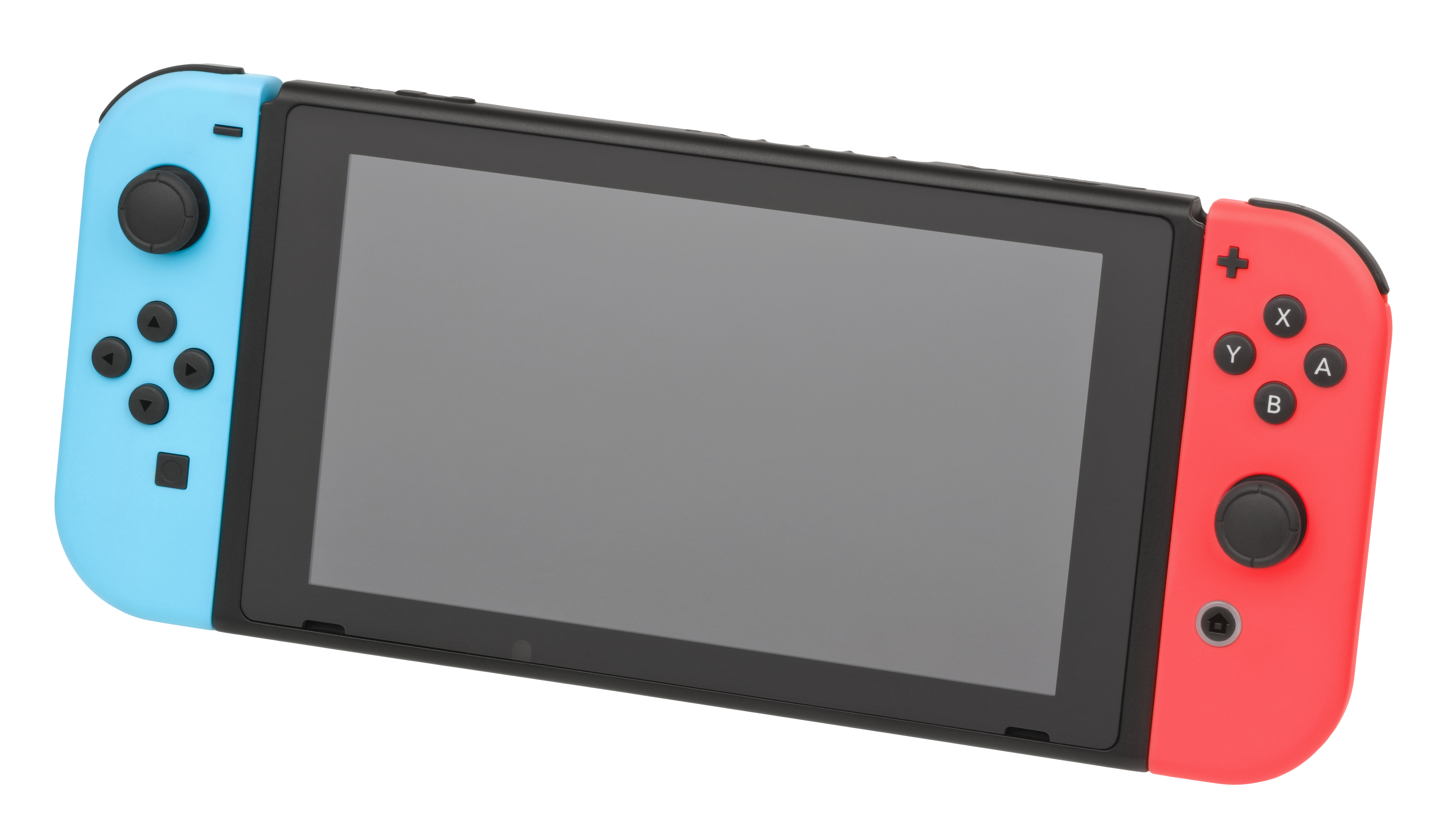
In "Handheld mode", with the Joy-Con attached to its sides

Nintendo Switch, a hybrid video game console, released in 2017

The Wii U's successor in the eighth generation of video game consoles, the Nintendo Switch, was released in March 2017. The Switch features a hybrid design as a home and handheld console, Joy-Con controllers that each contain an accelerometer and gyroscope, and the simultaneous wireless networking of up to eight consoles. To expand its library, Nintendo entered alliances with several third-party and independent developers; by February 2019, more than 1,800 Switch games had been released. The Switch has shipped over 156 million units worldwide as of June 2026, becoming the second-best selling console of all time behind the PlayStation 2. It is also Nintendo's most successful home console to date, surpassing the Wii's 101.6 million units.

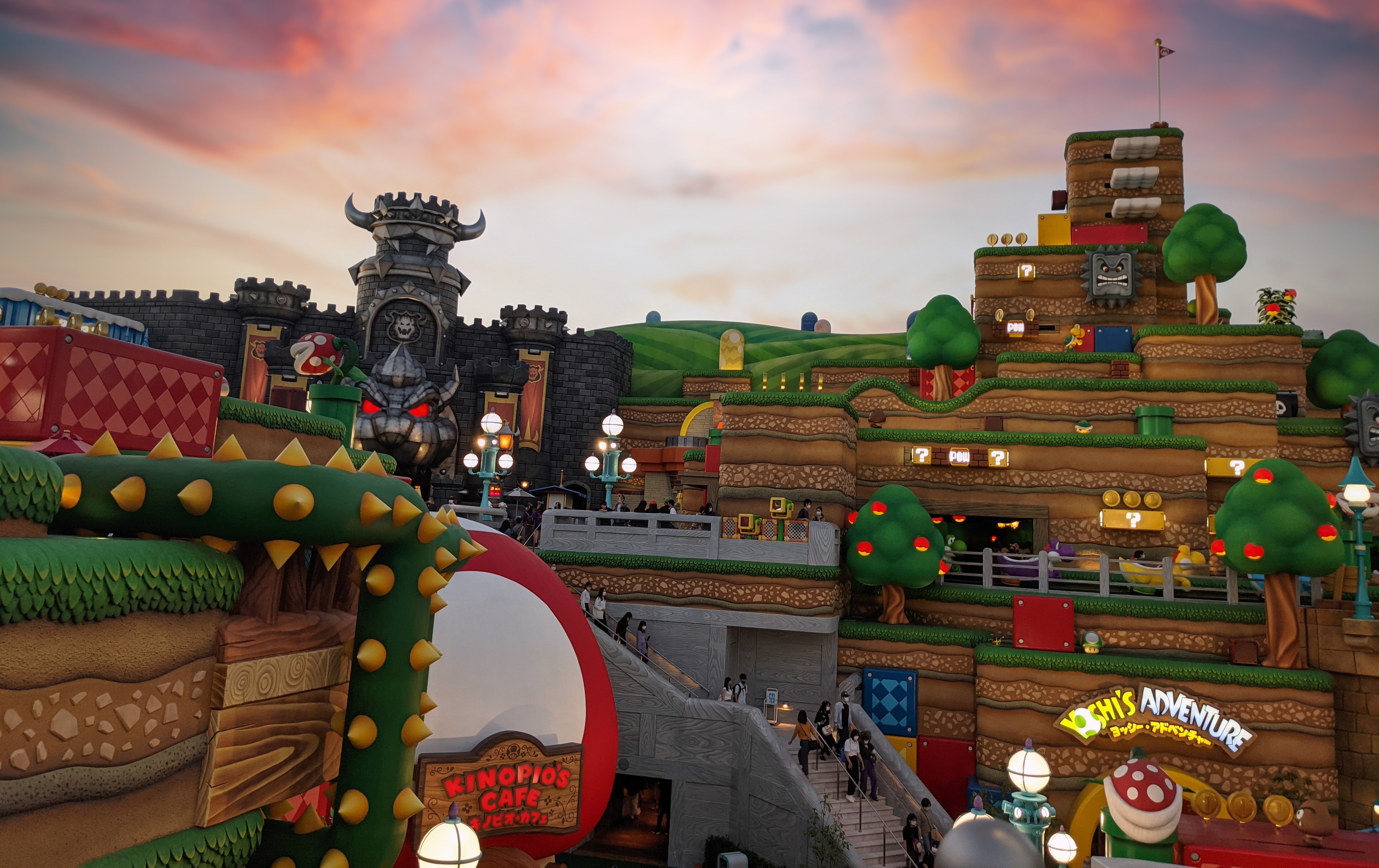
Super Nintendo World at Universal Studios Japan, opened in 2021

In 2018, Shuntaro Furukawa replaced Kimishima as company president, and in 2019, Doug Bowser succeeded Nintendo of America president Reggie Fils-Aimé. In April 2019, Nintendo formed an alliance with Tencent to distribute the Nintendo Switch in China starting in December.

In April 2020, Reuters reported that ValueAct Capital had acquired over 2.6 million shares in Nintendo stock worth US$1.1 billion over the course of a year, giving them an overall stake of 2% in Nintendo. Although the COVID-19 pandemic caused delays in the production and distribution of some of Nintendo's products, the situation "had limited impact on business results"; in May 2020, Nintendo reported a 75% increase in income compared to the previous fiscal year, mainly contributed by the Nintendo Switch Online service. The year saw some changes to the company's management: outside director Naoki Mizutani retired from the board, and was replaced by Asa Shinkawa; and Yoshiaki Koizumi was promoted to senior executive officer, maintaining his role as deputy general manager of Nintendo EPD. By August, Nintendo was named the richest company in Japan.

Super Nintendo World, a theme park area, opened at Universal Studios Japan in 2021. Nintendo co-produced an animated film The Super Mario Bros. Movie alongside Universal Pictures and Illumination, with Miyamoto and Illumination CEO Chris Meledandri acting as producers. In 2021, Furukawa indicated Nintendo's plan to create more animated projects based on their work outside the Mario film, and by 29 June, Meledandri joined the board of directors as a non-executive outside director. According to Furukawa, the company's expansion toward animated production is to keep "[the] business [of producing video games] thriving and growing", realizing the "need to create opportunities where even people who do not normally play on video game systems can come into contact with Nintendo characters". That day, Miyamoto said that "[Meledandri] really came to understand the Nintendo point of view" and that "asking for [his] input, as an expert with many years of experience in Hollywood, will be of great help to" Nintendo's transition into film production. Later, in July 2022, Nintendo acquired Dynamo Pictures, a Japanese CG company founded by Hiroshi Hirokawa on 18 March 2011. Dynamo had worked with Nintendo on digital shorts in the 2010s, including for the Pikmin series, and Nintendo said that Dynamo would continue its goal of expanding into animation. Following the completion of the acquisition in October 2022, Nintendo renamed Dynamo as Nintendo Pictures.

In February 2022, Nintendo announced the acquisition of SRD Co., Ltd. (Systems Research and Development) after 40 years, a major contributor of Nintendo's first-party games such as Donkey Kong and The Legend of Zelda until the 1990s, and then support studio since. In May 2022, Reuters reported that Saudi Arabia's Public Investment Fund had purchased a 5% stake in Nintendo, and by January 2023, its stake in the company had increased to 6.07%. It was raised to 7.08% by February 2023, and in the same week by 8.26%, making it the biggest external investor. In November 2024, Saudi Arabia's PIF dropped back to 6.3%.

Super Nintendo World opened at Universal Studios Hollywood in early 2023, followed by a Donkey Kong-themed expansion of the original land at Universal Studios Japan in 2024, and the opening of a Super Nintendo World area at Universal Epic Universe in Orlando in May 2025. The Super Mario Bros. Movie was released on 5 April 2023, and has grossed over $1.3 billion worldwide, setting box-office records for the biggest worldwide opening weekend for an animated film, the highest-grossing film based on a video game and the 15th-highest-grossing film of all-time.

Nintendo reached an agreement with Embracer Group in May 2024 to acquire 100% of the shares in Shiver Entertainment, a company that has specialized in porting triple-A games like Hogwarts Legacy and Mortal Kombat 1 to the Switch, making it a wholly owned subsidiary of Nintendo, subject to closing conditions. In October 2024, the company opened the Nintendo Museum on the site of its former Uji Ogura plant, where it had manufactured playing and hanafuda cards. The same month, Nintendo announced Nintendo Music, a mobile application enabling one to listen to soundtracks from Nintendo games. By November 2024, Nintendo gained full ownership of Monolith Soft, a first-party developer behind Xenoblade and provided support for The Legend of Zelda: Tears of the Kingdom.

==== 2025–present: Nintendo Switch 2 ====
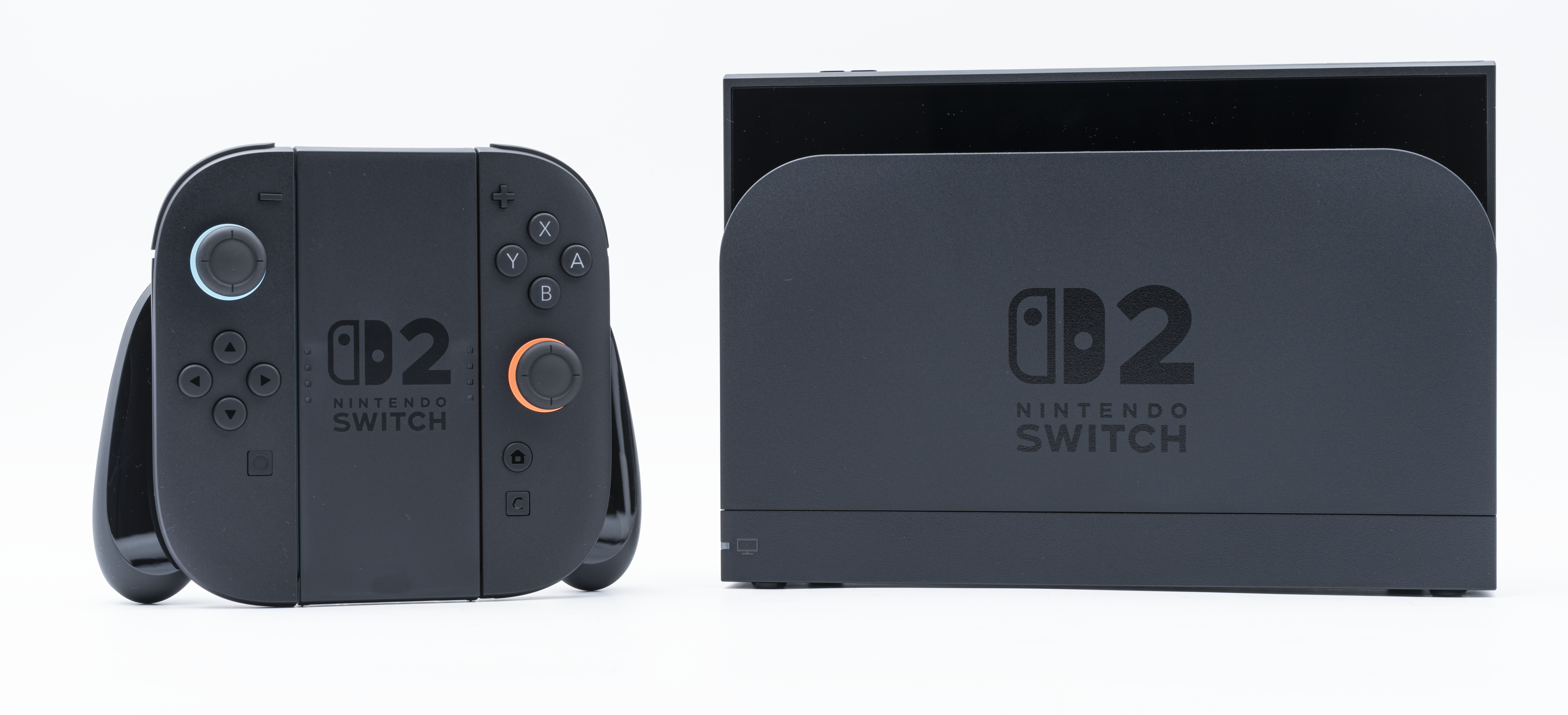
In "TV mode", with the Joy-Con 2 attached to a grip and the main unit docked

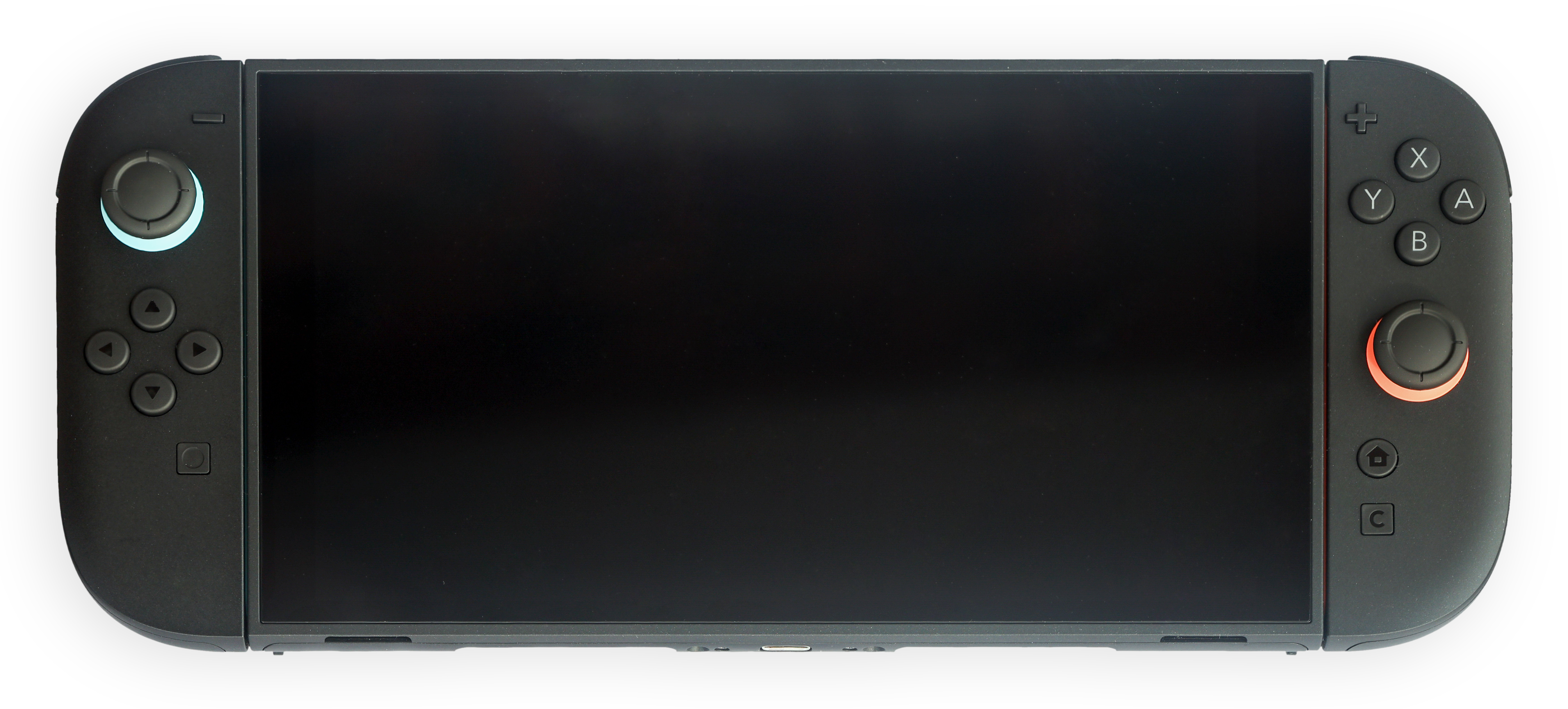
In "Handheld mode", with the Joy-Con 2 attached to its sides

Nintendo Switch 2, released in 2025

The successor to the Switch, the Nintendo Switch 2, was released on 5 June 2025. It has a larger display and more internal storage than the original Switch. It has updated graphics, controllers, and social features. It supports 1080p resolution and a 120 Hz refresh rate in handheld or tabletop mode, and 4K resolution with a 60 Hz refresh rate when docked. On 10 June, Nintendo reported that the Switch 2 had sold more than 3.5 million units worldwide, becoming the fastest selling console in history, overtaking the previous record-holder, the PlayStation 2. On 27 November 2025, Nintendo announced that it would acquire Bandai Namco Studios Singapore through a share transfer with Bandai Namco Studios starting with an 80% stake on 1 April 2026, followed by the rest of its stake when operations have stabilized. Following this, BNSS would rebrand to Nintendo Studios Singapore. The sequel to The Super Mario Bros. Movie, titled The Super Mario Galaxy Movie, was released on 1 April 2026 and has earned over $1 billion in the box office.

== Products ==
Nintendo's central focus is the research, development, production, and distribution of entertainment products—primarily video game software and hardware and card games. Its main markets are Japan, America, and Europe, and more than 70% of its total sales come from the latter two territories. As of May 2025, Nintendo's game consoles have sold over 860 million units, for which more than 5.9 billion video games have been sold globally.

=== Video game consoles ===
Since the launch of the Color TV-Game in 1977, Nintendo has produced and distributed home, handheld, dedicated, and hybrid consoles. In the 1980s, its first consoles to be successful were the Game & Watch and Nintendo Entertainment System. In the 1990s Nintendo launched new generations of home consoles with the Super Nintendo Entertainment System and Nintendo 64 and achieved global success with the Game Boy handheld console. In the 2000s, Nintendo found wide success again, with both the Nintendo DS and Wii. Each has a variety of accessories and controllers, such as the NES Zapper, the Game Boy Camera, the Super NES Mouse, the Rumble Pak, the Wii MotionPlus, the Wii U Pro Controller, and the Switch Pro Controller.

=== Video games ===
Nintendo's first electronic games are arcade games. EVR Race (1975) was the company's first electromechanical game, and Donkey Kong (1981) was the first platform game in history. Since then, both Nintendo and other development companies have produced and distributed an extensive catalog of video games for Nintendo's consoles. Nintendo's games are sold in both removable media formats such as optical disc and cartridge, and online formats which are distributed via services such as the Nintendo eShop and the Nintendo Network.

== Corporate structure ==
=== Nintendo Co., Ltd. ===
==== Headquarters buildings and development centers ====
Headquartered in Kyoto, Japan since the beginning, Nintendo Co., Ltd. oversees the organization's global operations and manages Japanese operations specifically. Operations in North America and Europe are conducted by the company's principal subsidiaries, Nintendo of America and Nintendo of Europe, respectively.

Nintendo Co., Ltd. has relocated its headquarters several times throughout its history. The company's headquarters building used from 1933 to 1959 has been renovated and has operated as the Marufukuro hotel (ja) since 2022. The headquarters building used from 1959 to 2000 is currently utilized as Nintendo's Kyoto Research Center. This building housed Intelligent Systems, a long-time development partner of Nintendo, from 2000 to 2013, and as of 2026 accommodates Mario Club Co., Ltd., (ja) a Nintendo subsidiary responsible for game debugging. The current headquarters building has been in use since 2000.

Nintendo's corporate headquarters throughout history
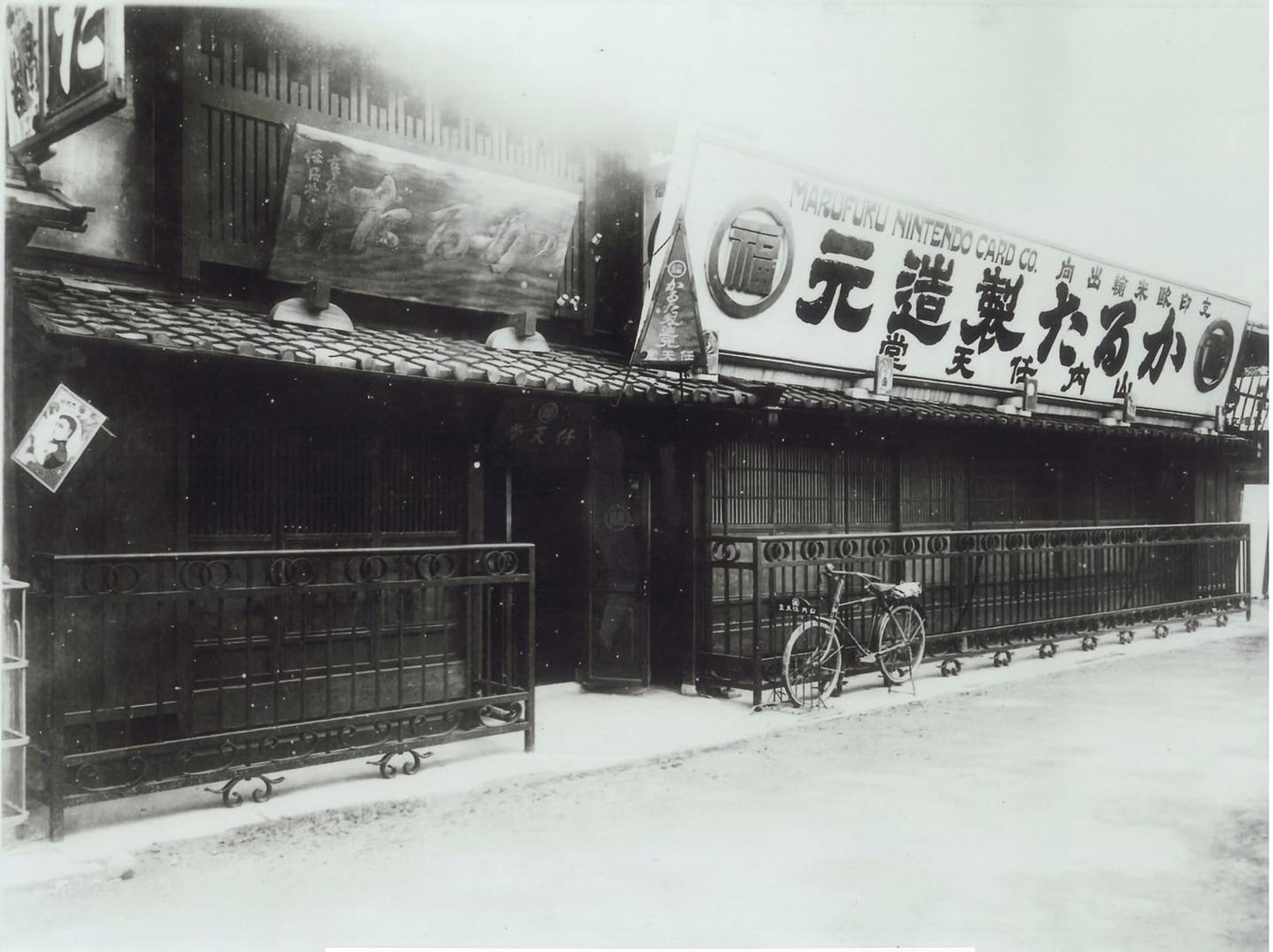
1889–1933, in Shimogyō-ku, Kyoto

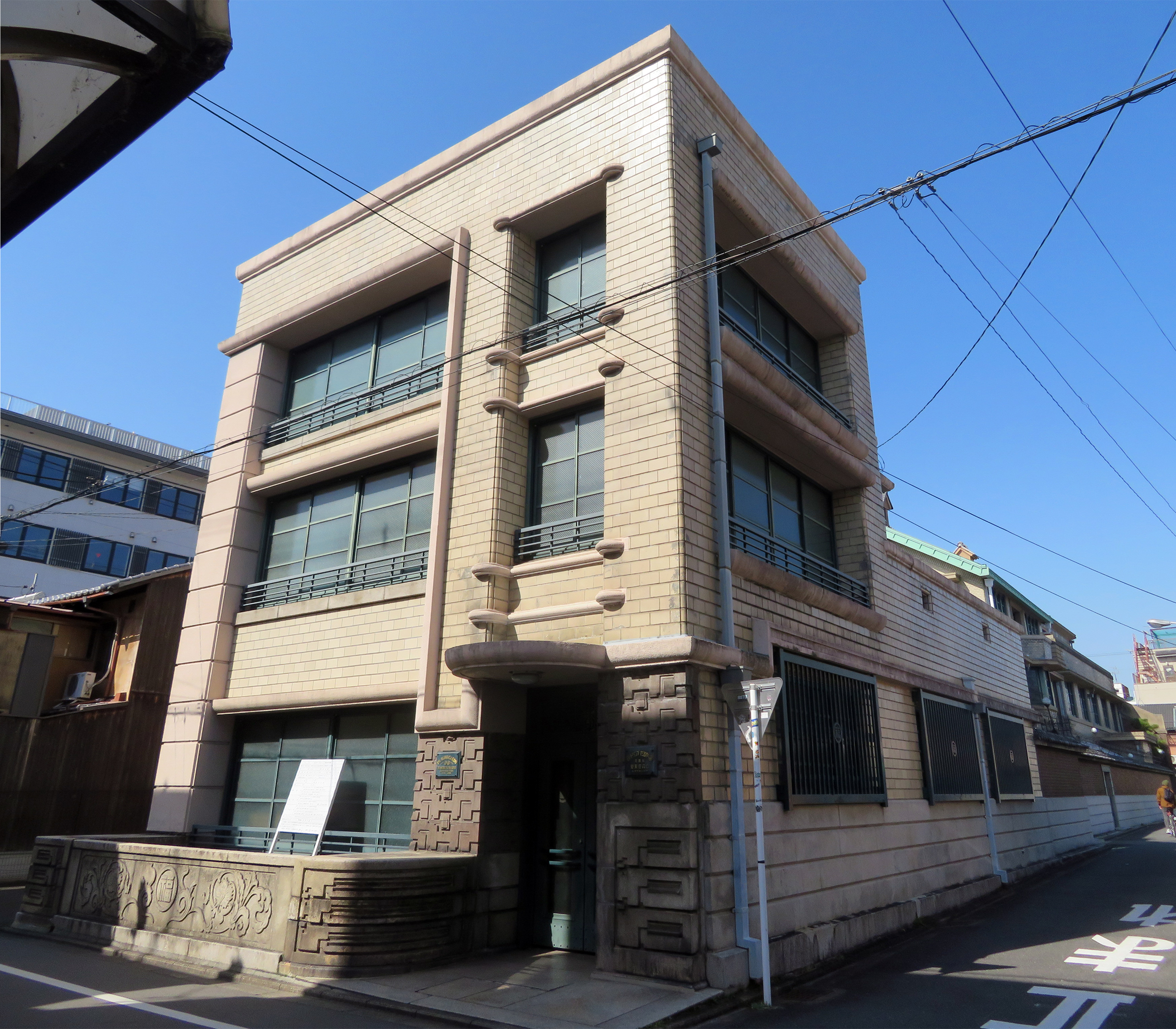
1933–1959, in Shimogyō-ku, Kyoto

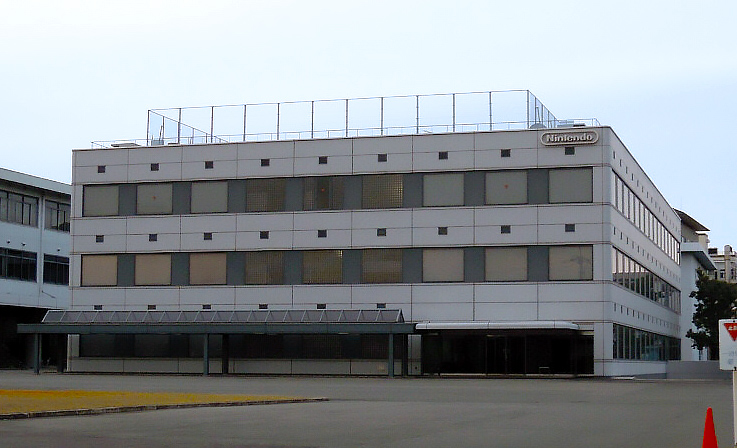
1959–2000, in Higashiyama-ku, Kyoto

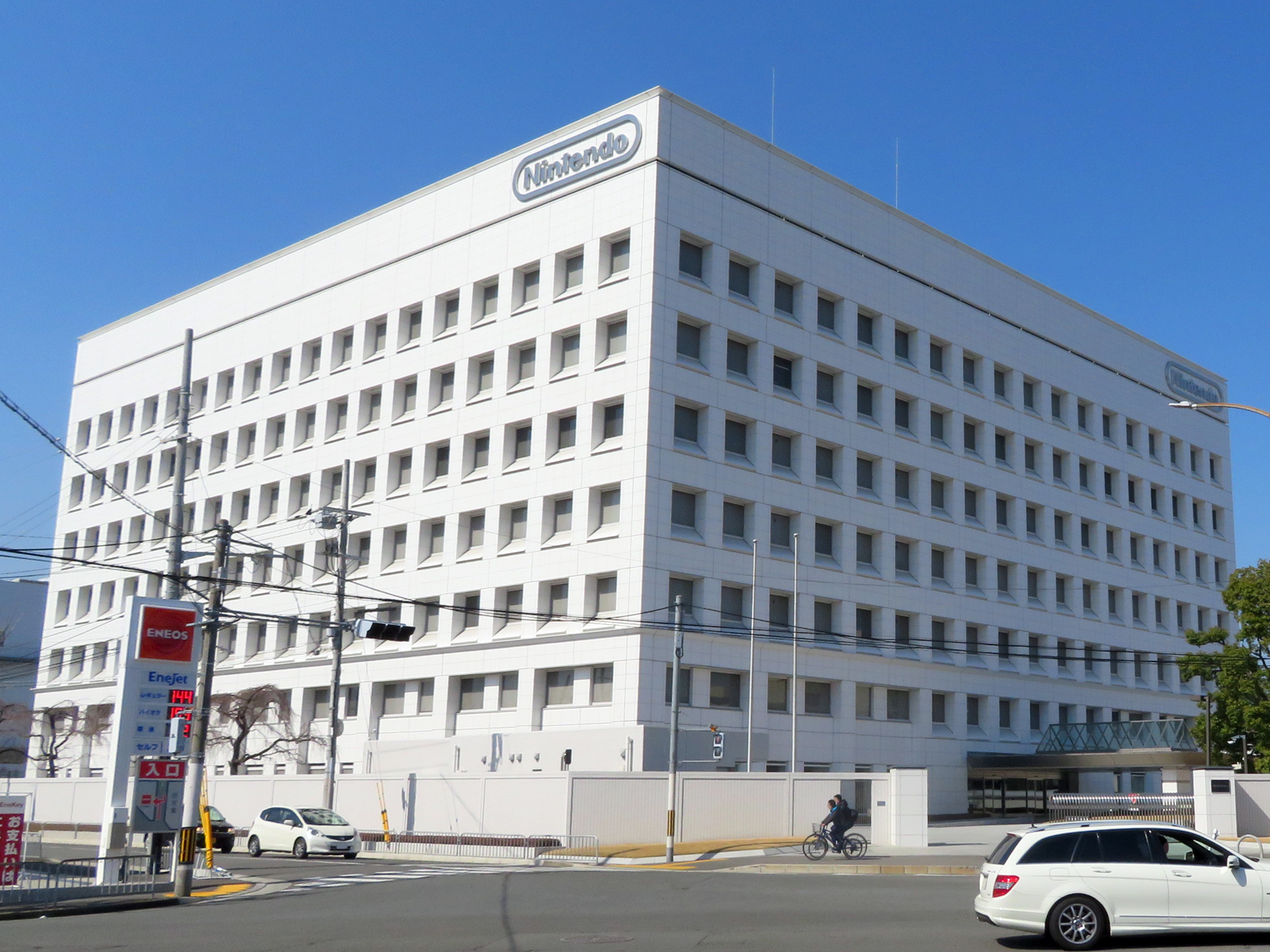
2000–present, in Minami-ku, Kyoto

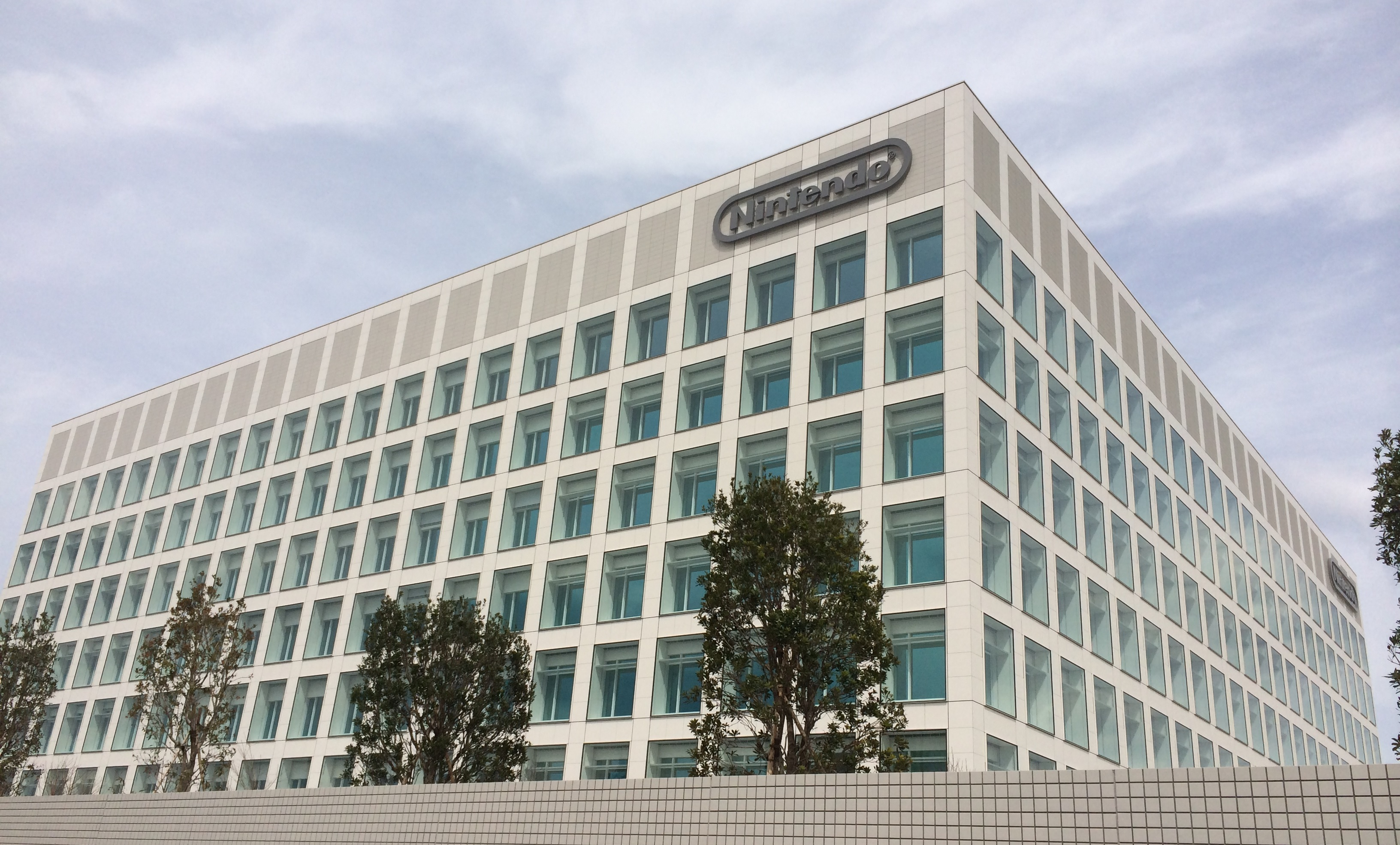
The Nintendo Development Center building, completed in 2014

In 2014, a Development Center was completed to the north of the headquarters, consolidating game development staff who had previously been dispersed between the headquarters and the Kyoto Research Center. The building houses the Entertainment Planning & Development Division and the Technology Development Division.

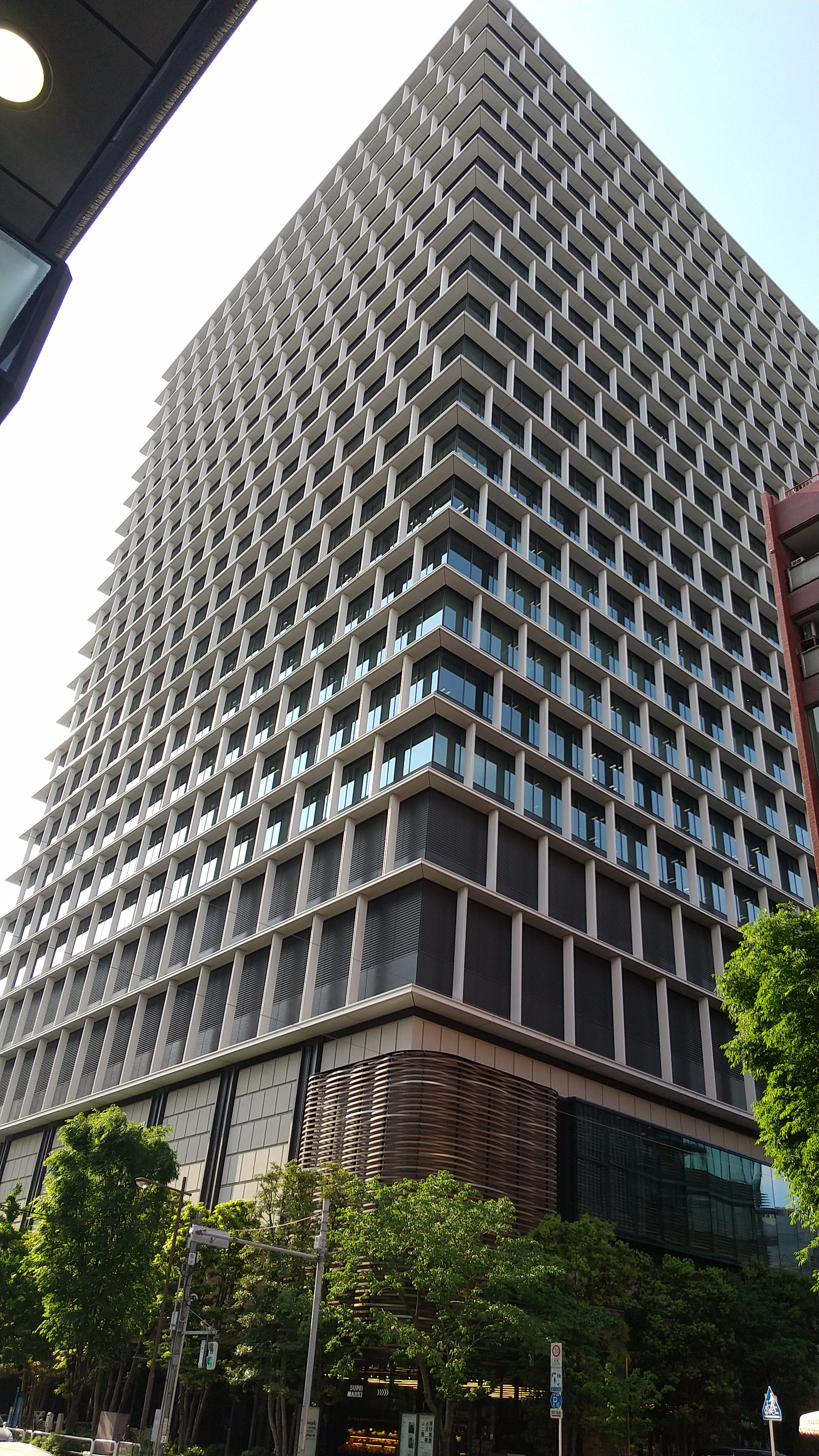
Kanda Square building, which houses Nintendo's Tokyo branch office (8th floor) since 2020

Nintendo established a development studio in Tokyo in 2003, in addition to its existing operations in Kyoto. The studio was organized as the Tokyo Software Development Department within the Entertainment Analysis and Development Division and was initially overseen by Takao Shimizu (ja) and Yoshiaki Koizumi, later taking responsibility for the development of 3D Mario games. It later evolved into Production Group No. 8 within Entertainment Planning & Development Division. In 2020, multiple Nintendo offices in Tokyo were consolidated into the Kanda Square building, (ja) where the company's Tokyo operations are now based alongside partner companies such as HAL Laboratory and Game Freak.

In 2029, the Technology Development Center is scheduled for completion on the site located between the headquarters and the Development Center, serving as a new research and development hub to support the increasing technological sophistication and scale of game production.

==== Directors and executive officers ====
As of June 2026, the board of directors of Nintendo consists of 13 members, six of whom are outside directors. Of these 13 members, four serve as Audit and Supervisory Committee Members. In addition, there are nine executive officers responsible for the execution of business operations in accordance with the policies determined by the board of directors. Heads of divisions at the headquarters, as well as the presidents of Nintendo of America and Nintendo of Europe, serve as either directors or executive officers. As a general rule, the heads of divisions at the headquarters hold the title of Senior General Manager; however, the Entertainment Planning & Development Division and the Marketing Division are overseen by Executive General Managers, with Senior General Managers serving as second-in-command.

As of fiscal year 2026, total compensation for the company's directors was as follows: Shuntaro Furukawa received ¥318 million (approximately US$2.0 million), Shigeru Miyamoto ¥246 million (approximately US$1.54 million), Shinya Takahashi ¥186 million (approximately US$1.16 million), Satoru Shibata ¥164 million (approximately US$1.03 million), and Ko Shiota and Yusuke Beppu each ¥96 million (approximately US$0.60 million).

Directors (Members of the Board)
President; Representative Director	Shuntaro Furukawa
Executive Fellow; Representative Director	Shigeru Miyamoto
Corporate Director; Senior Managing Executive Officer; Executive General Manager, Entertainment Planning & Development Division	Shinya Takahashi (ja)
Corporate Director; Managing Executive Officer; Executive General Manager, Marketing Division; Senior General Manager, Publisher & Developer Relations Division	Satoru Shibata
Corporate Director; Senior Executive Officer; Senior General Manager, Technology Development Division	Ko Shiota
Corporate Director; Senior Executive Officer; Senior Director, Corporate Planning Department	Yusuke Beppu
Outside Director	Chris Meledandri
Outside Director	Miyoko Demay
Outside Director	Kazuhiko Hachiya (ja)
Corporate Director (Full-time Audit and Supervisory Committee Member)	Yutaka Takenaga
Outside Director (Audit and Supervisory Committee Member)	Asa Shinkawa
Outside Director (Audit and Supervisory Committee Member)	Eiko Osawa
Outside Director (Audit and Supervisory Committee Member)	Chika Saka (ja)

Executive officers
Senior Executive Officer; Senior General Manager, Manufacturing Division	Hirokazu Shinshi
Senior Executive Officer; Senior General Manager, Entertainment Planning & Development Division	Yoshiaki Koizumi
Executive Officer; Senior General Manager, Finance Administration Division; In charge of Investor Relations	Hajime Murakami
Executive Officer; Senior General Manager, General Affairs Division	Kentaro Yamagishi
Executive Officer; Senior General Manager, Global Communications Division	Yoshiaki Kuratsune
Executive Officer; President, Nintendo of Europe SE	Luciano Perena Lopez
Executive Officer; Senior General Manager, Marketing Division; Senior General Manager, Asia & Oceania Business Division	Juro Takeuchi
Executive Officer; Senior General Manager, Corporate Analysis & Administration Division; Senior General Manager, Human Resources Division; Senior Director, President Office	Koji Miyake
Executive Officer; President, Nintendo of America Inc.	Devon Pritchard

==== Major research and development divisions ====
The internal research and development structure of Nintendo is primarily divided into three main divisions.

Entertainment Planning and Development (EPD)

The Nintendo Entertainment Planning & Development division is the primary software development, production, and supervising division at Nintendo, formed as a merger between its former Entertainment Analysis & Development and Software Planning & Development divisions in 2015. The division is composed of approximately ten production groups, including Production Group No. 3, which develops The Legend of Zelda series; Production Group No. 8, which develops 3D Mario games; as well as a programming management group, a sound management group, and a design management group. Led by Shinya Takahashi, the division holds the largest concentration of staff at the company, housing more than 800 engineers, producers, directors, coordinators, planners, and designers. Shinya Takahashi (ja), the Executive General Manager overseeing this division, and Yoshiaki Koizumi, the Senior General Manager, frequently serve as hosts of Nintendo Direct presentations.

Technology Development (TDD)

The Nintendo Technology Development division is a combination of Nintendo's former Integrated Research & Development (IRD) and System Development (SDD) divisions. Led by Ko Shiota, the division is responsible for designing hardware and developing Nintendo's operating systems, developer environment, and internal network, and maintenance of the Nintendo Network.

Business Development (NBD)

The Nintendo Business Development division was formed following Nintendo's foray into software development for smart devices such as mobile phones and tablets. It is responsible for refining Nintendo's business model for the dedicated video game system business and overseeing development for smart devices.

=== Subsidiaries ===
==== Development subsidiaries ====
Although most of the research and development (R&D) is being done in Japan, there are some R&D facilities in the United States, Europe, and China that are focused on developing software and hardware technologies used in Nintendo products. Although they all are subsidiaries of Nintendo (and therefore first-party), they are often referred to as external resources when being involved in joint development processes with Nintendo's internal developers by the Japanese personnel involved. This can be seen in the Iwata Asks interview series. Nintendo Software Technology (NST) and Nintendo Technology Development (NTD) are located in Redmond, Washington, United States, while Nintendo European Research & Development (NERD) is located in Paris, France, and Nintendo Network Service Database (NSD) is located in Kyoto, Japan.

Most external first-party software development is done in Japan; the only overseas subsidiaries are Retro Studios and Shiver Entertainment in the United States (acquired in 2002 and 2024, respectively) and Next Level Games in Canada (acquired in 2021). Although these studios are all subsidiaries of Nintendo, they are often referred to as external resources when being involved in joint development processes with Nintendo's internal developers by the Nintendo Entertainment Planning & Development (EPD) division. 1-Up Studio and Nintendo Cube are located in Tokyo, Japan, and Monolith Soft has one studio located in Tokyo and another in Kyoto.

Nintendo established The Pokémon Company alongside Creatures and Game Freak to manage the Pokémon brand. Similarly, Warpstar, Inc. was formed through a joint investment with HAL Laboratory, which was in charge of the Kirby: Right Back at Ya! animated series as well as the web series It's Kirby Time. Both companies are investments from Nintendo, with Nintendo holding 32% of the shares of The Pokémon Company and 50% of the shares of Warpstar, Inc. Following the success of The Super Mario Bros. Movie, Nintendo bought out HAL Laboratory's stake in Warpstar in April 2025, and by August 2025, rebranded the subsidiary as Nintendo Stars to focus on further multimedia initiatives involving Nintendo's IP.

Other notable subsidiaries include:

- iQue (China) Ltd.
- SRD Co., Ltd.
- Nintendo Pictures
- Nintendo Systems

==== Nintendo of America Inc. (NOA) ====
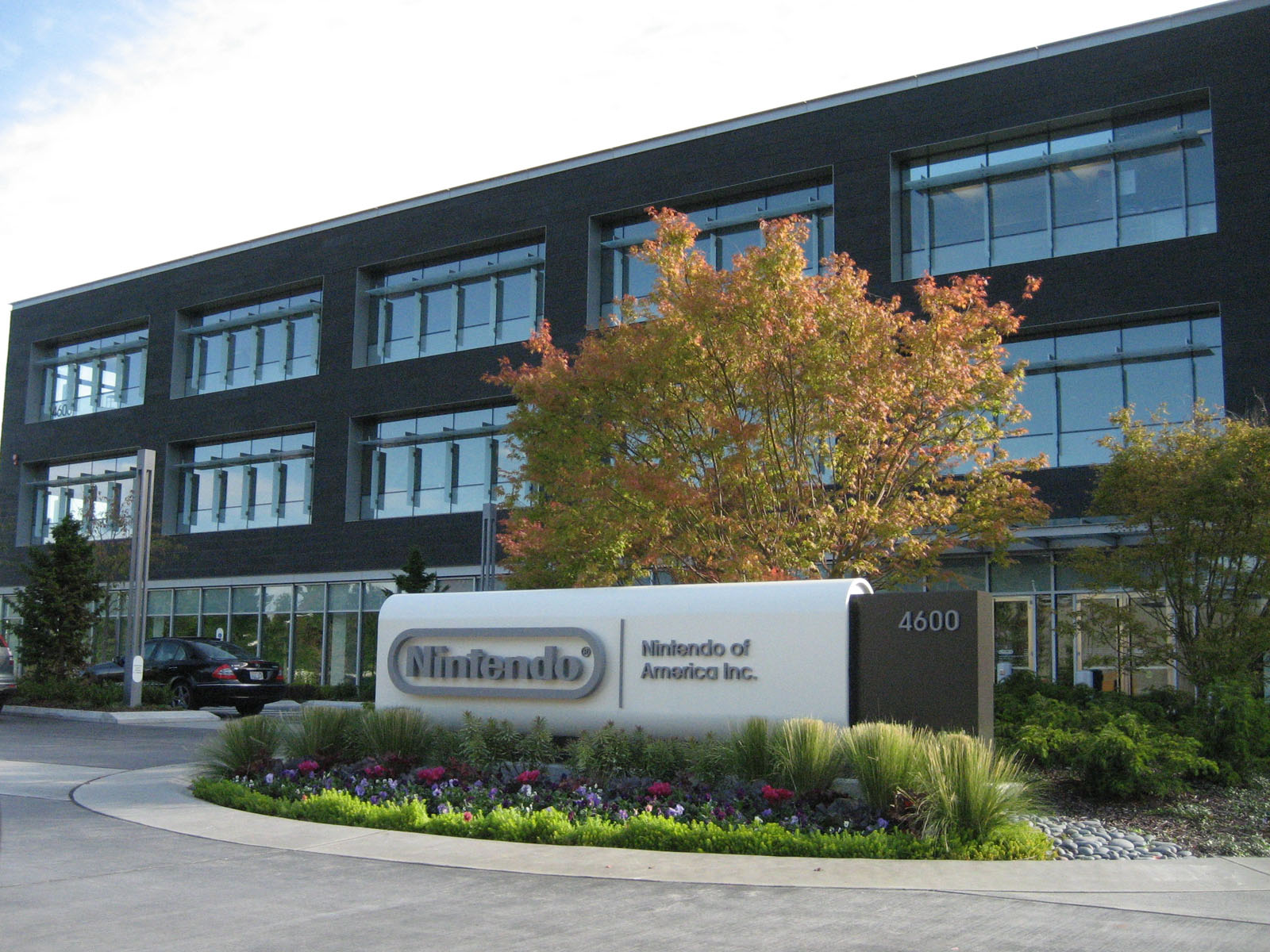
Nintendo of America headquarters in Redmond, Washington

Nintendo founded its North American subsidiary in 1980 as Nintendo of America (NOA). Hiroshi Yamauchi appointed his son-in-law Minoru Arakawa as president, who in turn hired his own wife and Yamauchi's daughter Yoko Yamauchi as the first employee. The Arakawa family moved from Vancouver, British Columbia to select an office in Manhattan, New York due to its central status in American commerce. As both were from extremely affluent families, their goals were set more by prestige than money. The seed capital and product inventory were supplied by the parent corporation in Japan, with a launch goal of entering the existing $8 billion-per-year coin-op arcade video game market and the largest entertainment industry in the US, which had already outclassed movies and television combined. During the couple's arcade research excursions, NOA hired young gamers to work in the poorly maintained warehouse in New Jersey to receive and service game hardware from Japan.

In late 1980, NOA contracted the Seattle-based arcade sales and distribution company Far East Video, consisting solely of experienced arcade salespeople Ron Judy and Al Stone. The two had already built a decent reputation and a distribution network, founded specifically for the independent import and sales of games from Nintendo because the Japanese company had for years been the under-represented maverick in America. Now as direct associates to the new NOA, they told Arakawa they could always clear all Nintendo inventory if Nintendo produced better games. Far East Video took NOA's contract for a fixed per-unit commission on the exclusive American distributorship of Nintendo games, to be settled by its Seattle-based lawyer, Howard Lincoln.

Based on favorable test arcade sites in Seattle, Arakawa wagered most of NOA's modest finances on a huge order of 3,000 Radar Scope cabinets. He panicked when the game failed in the fickle market upon its arrival from its four-month boat ride from Japan. Far East Video was already in financial trouble due to declining sales and Ron Judy borrowed his aunt's life savings of $50,000, while still hoping Nintendo would develop its first Pac-Man-sized hit. Arakawa regretted founding the Nintendo subsidiary, with the distressed Yoko trapped between her arguing husband and father.

Amid financial threat, Nintendo of America relocated from Manhattan to the Seattle metro to remove major stressors: the frenetic New York and New Jersey lifestyle and commute, and the extra weeks or months on the shipping route from Japan as was suffered by the Radar Scope disaster. With the Seattle harbor being the US's closest to Japan at only nine days by boat, and having a lumber production market for arcade cabinets, Arakawa's real estate scouts found a 60,000-square-foot (5,600 m^{2}) warehouse for rent containing three offices—one for Arakawa and one for Judy and Stone. This warehouse in the Tukwila suburb was owned by Mario Segale, after whom the Mario character would be named, and was initially managed by former Far East Video employee Don James. After one month, James recruited his college friend Howard Phillips as an assistant, who soon took over as warehouse manager. The company remained at fewer than 10 employees for some time, handling sales, marketing, advertising, distribution, and limited manufacturing of arcade cabinets and Game & Watch handheld units, all sourced and shipped from Nintendo.

Arakawa was still panicked over NOA's ongoing financial crisis. With the parent company having no new game ideas, he had been repeatedly pleading for Yamauchi to reassign some top talent away from existing Japanese products to develop something for America—especially to redeem the massive dead stock of Radar Scope cabinets. Since all of Nintendo's key engineers and programmers were busy, and with NOA representing only a tiny fraction of the parent's overall business, Yamauchi allowed only the assignment of Gunpei Yokoi's young assistant who had no background in engineering, Shigeru Miyamoto.

NOA's staff—except the sole young gamer Howard Phillips—were uniformly revolted at the sight of the freshman developer Miyamoto's debut game, which it had imported in the form of emergency conversion kits for the overstock of Radar Scope cabinets. The kits transformed the cabinets into NOA's massive windfall gain of $280 million from Miyamoto's smash hit Donkey Kong in 1981–1983 alone. They sold 4,000 new arcade units each month in America, making the 24-year-old Phillips "the largest volume shipping manager for the entire Port of Seattle". Arakawa used these profits to buy 27 acres (11 ha) of land in Redmond in July 1982 and to perform the $50 million launch of the Nintendo Entertainment System in 1985 which revitalized the entire video game industry from its devastating 1983 crash. A second warehouse in Redmond was soon secured, and managed by Don James. The company stayed at around 20 employees for some years.

On 10 August 1993, Nintendo of America rolled out the Nintendo Gateway System. It saw usage in participating airlines and hotels, and was an early form of interactive, personal in-flight entertainment that allowed users to play Nintendo games, listen to music, and watch videos.

The organization was reshaped nationwide in the following decades, and those core sales and marketing business functions directed by an office in Redwood City, California. The company's distribution centers are Nintendo Atlanta in Atlanta, Georgia, and Nintendo North Bend in North Bend, Washington. As of 2007, the 380,000-square-foot (35,000 m^{2}) Nintendo North Bend facility processes more than 20,000 orders a day to Nintendo customers, which include retail stores that sell Nintendo products in addition to consumers who shop Nintendo's website. Nintendo of America's Canadian branch, Nintendo of Canada (known in French as Nintendo du Canada), is based in Burnaby, British Columbia, having previously operated in Vancouver and formerly operated a distribution center in Toronto, Ontario. Nintendo Treehouse is NOA's localization team, composed of around 80 staff who are responsible for translating games from Japanese to English, creating videos and marketing plans, and quality assurance.

Nintendo of America announced in October 2021 that it will be closing its offices in Redwood City, California, and Toronto and merging its operations with its Redmond and Vancouver offices. In April 2022, an anonymous quality assurance worker filed a complaint with the National Labor Relations Board, alleging Nintendo of America and contractor Aston Carter had engaged in union-busting activities and surveillance. The employee had been fired for mentioning unionizing efforts in the industry during a company meeting. The companies agreed to a settlement with the employee in October 2022. In March 2024, Nintendo of America restructured its product testing teams, resulting in the elimination of over 100 contractor roles. Some of the affected contractors were given full-time roles. Following the retirement of Doug Bowser on 31 December 2025, Devon Pritchard assumed the role of Nintendo of America president and COO, while Satoru Shibata was appointed CEO.

==== Nintendo of Europe SE (NOE) ====
Nintendo's European subsidiary was established in June 1990, based in Frankfurt, Germany. The company handles operations across Europe (excluding Scandinavia, where operations are handled by Bergsala on behalf of NOE), as well as South Africa and some Middle Eastern markets such as Saudi Arabia and the United Arab Emirates. Nintendo of Europe's British branch (Nintendo UK) handles operations in the United Kingdom and Ireland from its headquarters in Windsor, Berkshire. In June 2014, NOE initiated a reduction and consolidation process, yielding a combined 130 layoffs: the closing of its office and warehouse, termination of all employment, in Großostheim; and the consolidation of all of those operations into, and terminating some employment at, its Frankfurt location. As of July 2018, the company employs 850 people. In October 2018, Nintendo of Europe announced plans to relocate to a new 160,000-square-foot (15,000 m^{2}) headquarters in Frankfurt, eventually moving into the location in 2020 during the COVID-19 pandemic. In 2019, NOE signed with Tor Gaming Ltd. for official distribution in Israel.

Nintendo of Europe headquarters
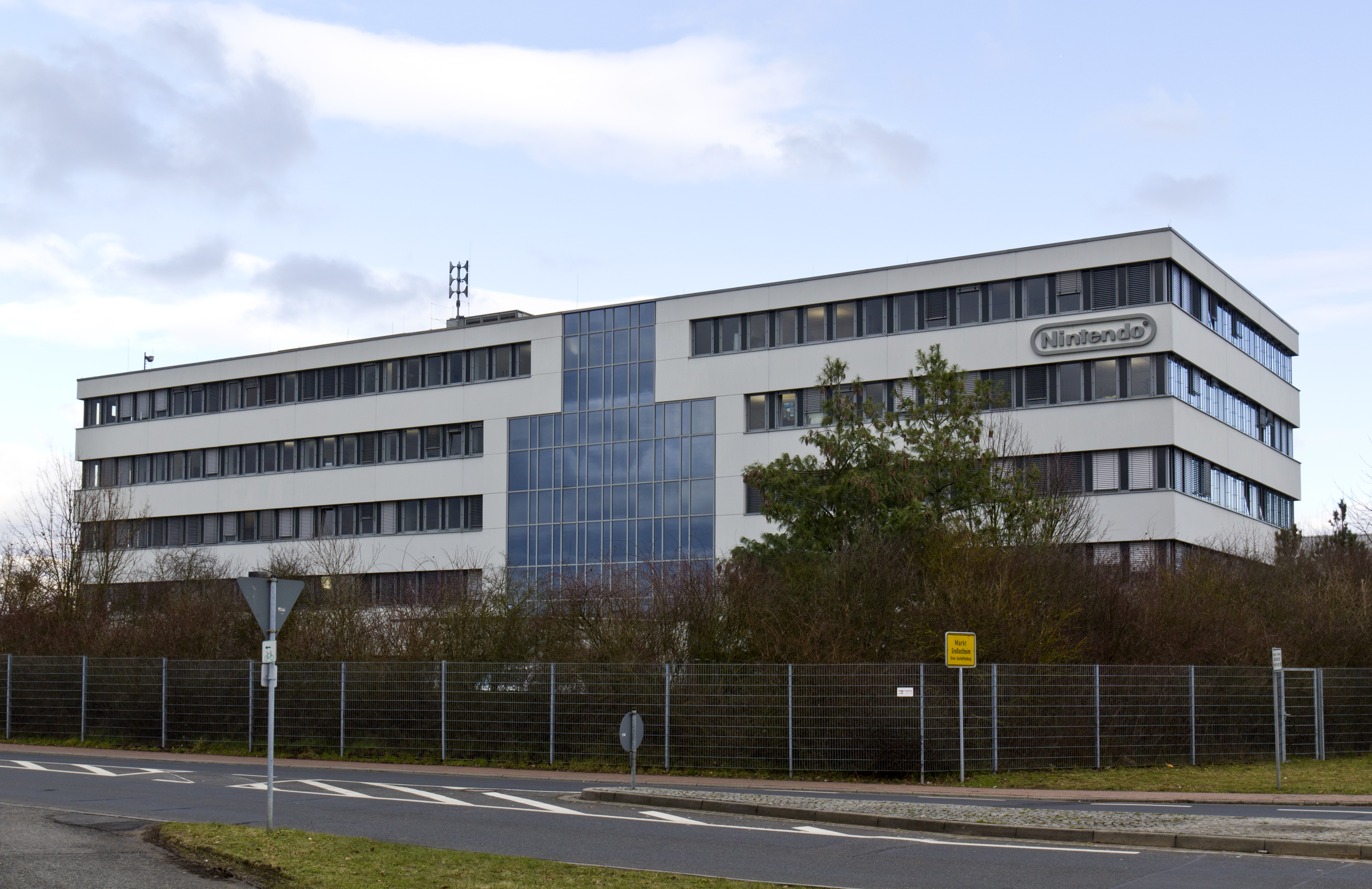
Former Nintendo of Europe headquarters in Großostheim, Germany, until 2014

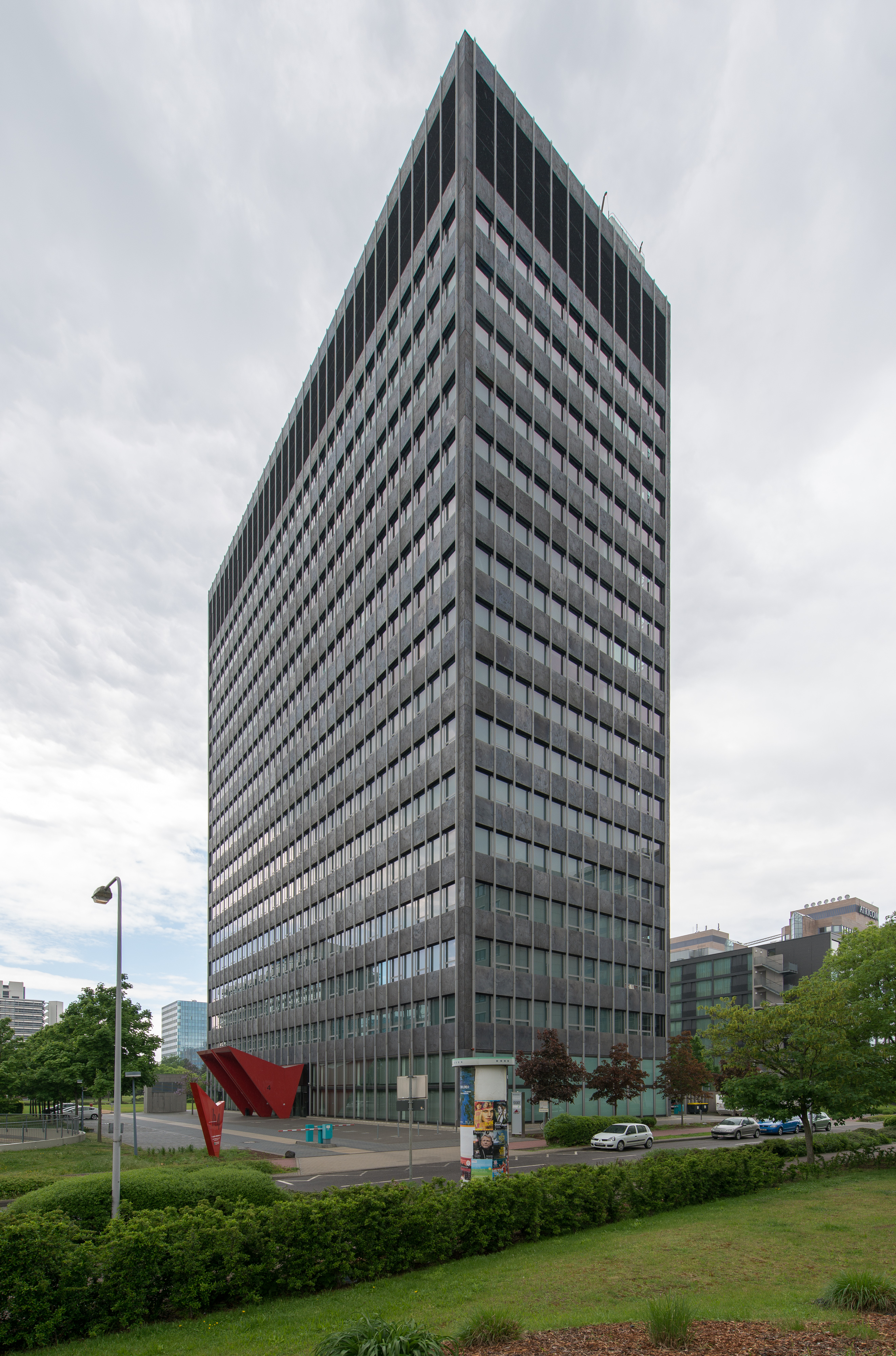
Former Nintendo of Europe headquarters in Frankfurt, Germany, until 2020

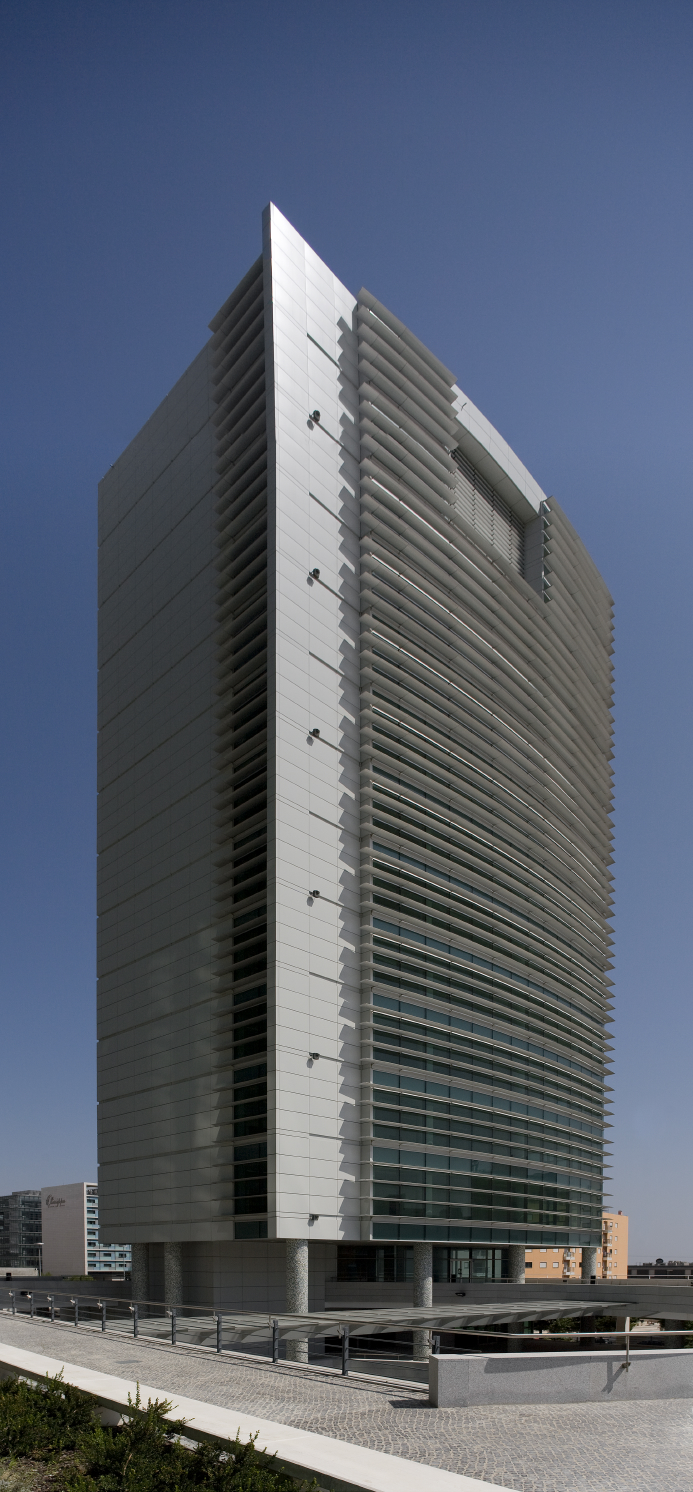
Former Nintendo of Europe (formerly Nintendo Iberica) office in Lisbon, Portugal, until 2025

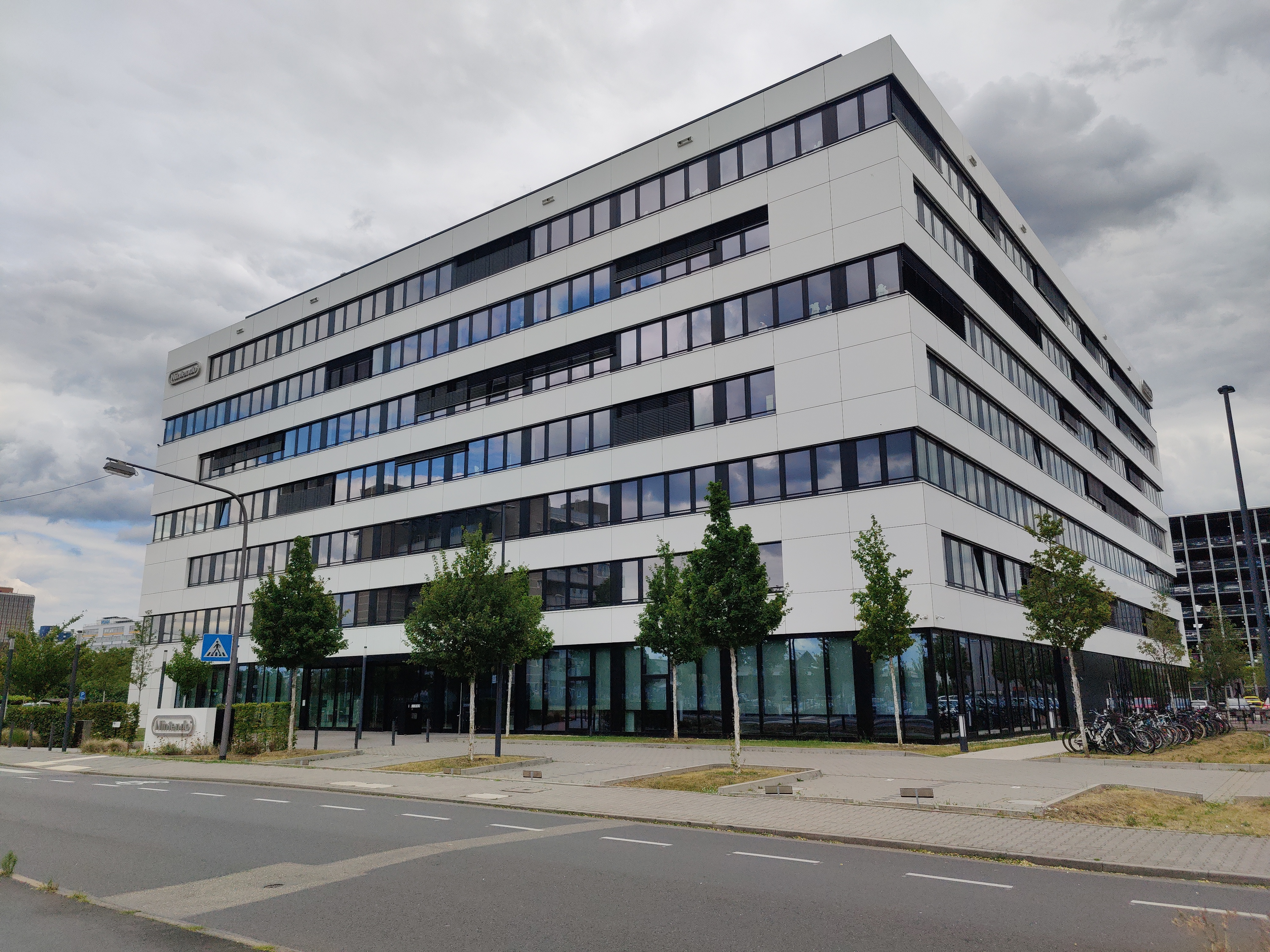
Current Nintendo of Europe headquarters in Frankfurt, Germany, after 2020

==== Nintendo Australia Pty. Ltd. (NAL) ====
Nintendo Australia was established in June 1993, and is based in Scoresby, Victoria, a suburb of Melbourne. It handles the publishing, distribution, sales, and marketing of Nintendo products in Australia and New Zealand. Its original headquarters was located in Mulgrave, Victoria. Prior to NAL assuming publishing and distribution of all Nintendo products in Australia in January 1994, distribution was handled in Australia by Mattel Australia and in New Zealand by Video One on behalf of Mattel.

The founding General Managers of NAL were Graham Kerry (formerly the Managing Director of Mattel Australia) and Susumu Tanaka (then-transferred from Nintendo UK and currently a Senior Executive Officer at Nintendo's global HQ in Kyoto). Former Managing Directors include current Nintendo of America CEO Satoru Shibata and Rose Lappin, who previously worked on Nintendo products for Mattel Australia prior to joining NAL in 1993. Since its establishment, NAL has also published and distributed third-party video games in Australia for publishers such as Virgin Interactive Entertainment, Accolade, Atlus, Sega of Europe, Capcom Europe, Rising Star Games, Marvelous, Bandai Namco Entertainment, Enix & Square Enix, Hudson Soft, Disney Interactive and Tomy, amongst others.

==== Nintendo of Korea ====
Nintendo's South Korean subsidiary was established on 7 July 2006 and is based in Seoul. In March 2016, the subsidiary was heavily downsized due to a corporate restructuring after analyzing shifts in the current market, laying off 80% of its employees, leaving only ten people, including former CEO Hiroyuki Fukuda. This did not affect any games scheduled for release in South Korea, and Nintendo continued operations there as usual. Takahiro Miura would later take over as CEO in 2018. In April 2025, the subsidiary gained international attention when its website unintentionally leaked the presence of young Pauline in Donkey Kong Bananza.

==== Nintendo Singapore ====
Nintendo's Singaporean subsidiary was established on 26 September 2025. Takahiro Miura is the supervising branch manager. In November, Nintendo also announced its plans to acquire Bandai Namco Studios Singapore and rename it Nintendo Studios Singapore.

==== Nintendo Thailand ====
Nintendo's Thai subsidiary was established on 17 November 2025. Like Nintendo Singapore, Takahiro Miura is the supervising branch manager. The Thailand office focuses on improving Nintendo business in the country, as well as software distribution and localization for some titles starting with Donkey Kong Bananza.

==== Greater China ====
Nintendo Phuten was incorporated in Taipei, Taiwan in 1991 as Phuten Co., Ltd. As Nintendo's Taiwanese subsidiary, it distributed Nintendo's products in Taiwan until its closure in 2014. Its responsibilities were handed over to Nintendo (Hong Kong) Limited until 2025, when Nintendo Taiwan Co., Ltd. was formed in Taipei to handle sales in the region.

Nintendo (Hong Kong) Limited was incorporated on 7 April 2005. It marketed the Wii in Hong Kong, after Nintendo could not market the console in Mainland China under iQue for being unable to circumvent the ban on foreign-made consoles imposed by the Chinese government. It currently handles distribution of Nintendo consoles in Hong Kong. Taiwan was also included under the division from 2014 until 2025.

=== Additional distributors ===
==== Active Boeki ====
Active Boeki is a distribution company based in Kobe that handles the distribution of Nintendo hardware and software in Southeast Asia and the Middle East since the Game & Watch era, under the responsibility of Nintendo Co. Ltd. in Japan. The company works with local resellers, such as Singapore-based Maxsoft handling distribution and sales in Singapore, Malaysia, Indonesia, Thailand and the Philippines. Active Boeki also works with resellers such as UAE-based Active Gulf and Saudi-based Shas Samurai, responsible for distribution and sales in the United Arab Emirates, Oman, Saudi Arabia, Qatar, Bahrain and Kuwait. Maxsoft and Active Boeki were also an authorized distributor in India until late 2010s. In 2023, Active Boeki through Shas Samurai has ceased its distributing operations for Saudi Arabia, as AIC Trading received distribution rights for Nintendo in the country, overseen by Nintendo of Europe. Active Boeki through Maxsoft is also no longer the sole exclusive distributor for Nintendo in Southeast Asia after the appointment of new distributors in charge of distribution, sales, promotion and pop-up stores related to Nintendo products domestically in all countries previously covered by Maxsoft, such as Convergent Systems responsible for Singapore and Malaysia, Synnex for Thailand, VST-ECS for the Philippines, and Nusantara Interactive Niaga under the Salim Group umbrella for Indonesia.

==== Bergsala ====
Bergsala, a third-party company based in Sweden, exclusively handles Nintendo operations in the Nordic region and Baltic States. Bergsala's relationship with Nintendo was established in 1981 when the company sought to distribute Game & Watch units to Sweden, which later expanded to the NES console by 1986.

==== Tencent ====
Nintendo has partnered with Tencent to release Nintendo products in China, following the lifting of the country's console ban in 2015. In addition to distributing hardware, Tencent helps with the governmental approval process for video game software.

==== Tor Gaming ====
In January 2019, Ynet and IGN Israel reported that negotiations about the official distribution of Nintendo products in the country were ongoing. After two months, IGN Israel announced that Tor Gaming Ltd., a company established in earlier 2019, gained a distribution agreement with Nintendo of Europe, handling official retailing beginning at the start of March, followed by opening an official online store the next month.

==== CD Media ====
CD Media, a third-party company based in Greece, exclusively handles Nintendo operations in Greece, Cyprus, in the Balkans from 2016 and in Turkey from 2018.

==== ERC ====
Nintendo has partnered with ERC to release Nintendo products in Ukraine starting from 9 November 2021.

==== JVLAT ====
Juegos de Video Latinoamérica (JVLAT) is the exclusive distributor for the Latin America region since 2006. It was created by Motta International, which from 2001 to 2003 took control of Nintendo distribution in the region.

==== Core ====
Core is an African distributor responsible for Angola, Botswana, Eswatini, Lesotho, Madagascar, Malawi, Mozambique, Namibia, Nigeria, South Africa, Zambia, and Zimbabwe.

==== ConQuest Entertainment ====
Nintendo has partnered with ConQuest to distribute products in the Czech Republic, Hungary, Poland, and Slovakia.

== Marketing ==
Nintendo of America has engaged in several high-profile marketing campaigns to define and position its brand. One of its earliest and most enduring slogans was "Now you're playing with power!", used first to promote its Nintendo Entertainment System. It modified the slogan to include "SUPER power" for the Super Nintendo Entertainment System, and "PORTABLE power" for the Game Boy.

Its 1994 "Play It Loud!" campaign played upon teenage rebellion and fostered an edgy reputation. During the Nintendo 64 era, the slogan was "Get N or get out". During the GameCube era, the "Who Are You?" campaign suggested a link between the games and the players' identities. The company promoted its Nintendo DS handheld with the tagline "Touching is Good". For the Wii, it used the "Wii would like to play" slogan to promote the console with the people who tried the games including Super Mario Galaxy and Super Paper Mario. The Nintendo 3DS used the slogan "Take a look inside". The Wii U used the slogan "How U will play next". The Nintendo Switch uses the slogan "Switch and Play" in North America, and "Play anywhere, anytime, with anyone" elsewhere.

=== Trademark ===
During the peak of Nintendo's success in the video game industry in the 1990s, its name was ubiquitously used to refer to any video game console, regardless of the manufacturer. To prevent its trademark from becoming generic, Nintendo pushed the term "game console", and succeeded in preserving its trademark.

=== Stores ===
Nintendo operates or licenses retail stores across the world.

==== Hong Kong ====
In Hong Kong, a third-party franchisee operates several Nintendo Switch-focused retail stores under the name of NSEW. The first store opened in March 2020 in Sham Shui Po. Two additional stores later opened, alongside a temporary pop-up store in the Hong Kong International Airport.

Another Nintendo Switch-focused store, Assemble, is located in Wan Chai. This store opened on 14 November 2024. This store features a dedicated section to third-party developer and publisher Cygames.

==== Israel ====
In June 2019, Nintendo's official Israeli distributor TorGaming Ltd. opened the second brick-and-mortar Nintendo retail store in the world, entitled Nintendo Israel, at Dizengoff Center in Tel Aviv. The store was Dizengoff Center's second largest launch.

==== Japan ====
On 1 February 2019, Nintendo announced that it would open Nintendo Tokyo as a facility at the then-under-construction Shibuya Parco department store in the Fall of that year, being its first self-managed store in the country. The store opened with the complex on 22 November 2019.

Since Nintendo Tokyo's opening, two additional Nintendo stores have opened in Japan. Nintendo Osaka opened on 11 November 2022, located on the thirteenth floor of the Daimaru Umeda department store in Kita-ku, as a store-within-a-store. Nintendo Kyoto, located within the Takashimaya Department Store building in Kyoto, opened on 17 October 2023.

==== Saudi Arabia ====
In May 2012, Shas Samurai, Nintendo's official representative in Saudi Arabia, opened a "Nintendo World Store" at Al Faisaliah Mall in Riyadh.

==== United States ====
Nintendo opened its first retail store, Nintendo World (now Nintendo New York), on 14 May 2005, at the former location of the Pokémon Center at Rockefeller Center in New York City.

Nintendo opened its second US store called Nintendo San Francisco in the city's Union Square neighborhood on 15 May 2025.

The Nintendo of America headquarters in Redmond, Washington has a private store which is open only to employees and invited guests.

==== Pop-up stores ====
Additionally, Nintendo launched official pop-up stores in 2021 at various Japanese cities, and later in 2023 in Seoul, Singapore, and Hong Kong.

=== Logos ===
In use since the 1960s, Nintendo's most recognizable logo is the ovoid racetrack shape, especially the red-colored wordmark typically displayed on a white background, primarily used in the Western markets from 1985 to 2006. In Japan, a monochromatic version that lacks a colored background is on Nintendo's own Famicom, Super Famicom, Nintendo 64, GameCube, and handheld console packaging and marketing, using the blue color. Since 2006, in conjunction with the launch of the Wii, Nintendo changed its logo to a gray variant that lacks a colored background inside the wordmark, making it transparent. A white variant on a red background has been used since 2016, and has been in full effect since the launch of the Nintendo Switch in 2017.

1889–1950

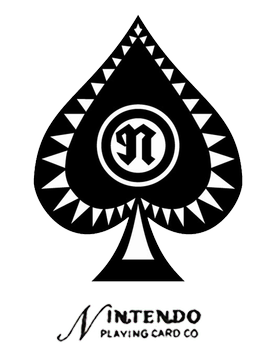
1950–1960

1960–1965

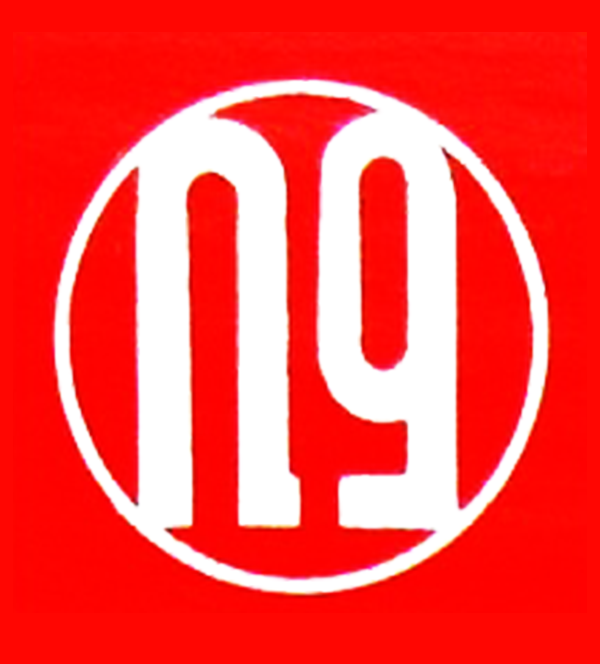
1965–1967

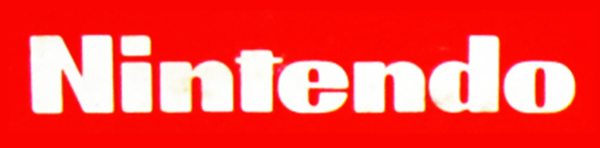
1967–1968

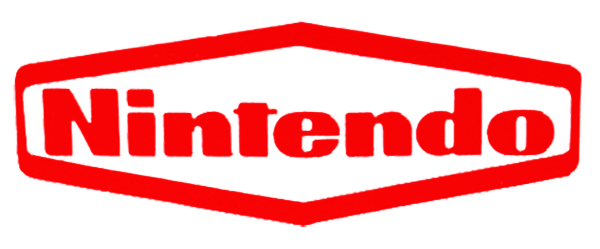
1968–1970

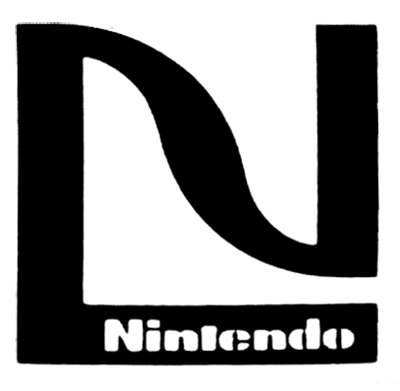
1970–1972

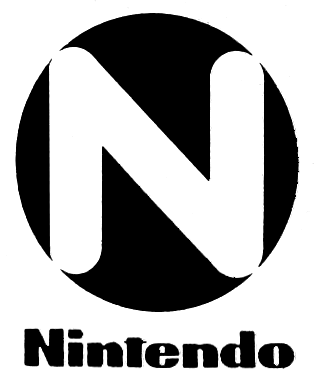
1972–1975

1975–present (red coloring in Western markets)

1975 logo with grey coloring, 2004–2016

1975 logo with red background, 2016–present

== Policy ==
=== Business strategy and "Nintendo DNA" ===
Nintendo defines the core of its business activities as entertainment, with a particular focus on family-oriented experiences. The company has identified “expanding the Nintendo IP fanbase” and “fostering long-term relationships with consumers” as its two primary strategies.

In terms of employee development, Nintendo emphasizes what it refers to as "Nintendo DNA," consisting of three elements: originality, flexibility, and sincerity. The company describes originality as the continuous provision of new forms of entertainment and distinctive experiences. Flexibility is defined as the ability to adapt to changes in the business environment without being constrained by past successes or established conventions. Sincerity is explained as the accumulation of small but reliable actions that can lead to significant outcomes over time, accompanied by a commitment to humility and sustained effort.

Nintendo states that it regards teamwork as essential to the creation of new forms of entertainment and emphasizes fostering a workplace environment in which team members exchange ideas through discussion and receive appropriate guidance when needed. It further explains that employee evaluation at Nintendo Co., Ltd. is based not on innate personal traits or short-term results, but on demonstrated behaviors related to "Nintendo DNA," individual development, and teamwork.

=== Financial ===
Unlike most Japanese companies, Nintendo has generally kept a large cash reserve instead of using the extra funds for investments or stock buybacks and dividends, a policy set in place by Hiroshi Yamauchi. As of September 2025, the company is estimated to have ¥1.5 trillion in cash reserves, amounting to around 120% of its sales. This cash reserved helped Nintendo quickly recover from poor sales of the GameCube and Wii U, as well as provide financial assurance for Nintendo to put into long-term projects.

=== Nintendo of America Inc. v. U.S. Department of the Treasury ===
In March 2026, Nintendo of America filed a lawsuit seeking a refund after the Supreme Court of the United States ruled that the second Trump administration's use of the International Emergency Economic Powers Act to impose tariffs was illegal. Nintendo of America's lawsuit is asking for an unspecified amount of a refund (plus interest). The lawsuit states that the "Plaintiff has been substantially harmed by the unlawful execution and imposition of the unauthorized Executive Orders and corresponding payment of the IEEPA Duties", and it cites the tariffs on other countries including Mexico, Canada, and China.

=== Content guidelines ===
For many years, Nintendo had a policy of strict content guidelines for video games published on its consoles. Although Nintendo allowed graphic violence in its video games released in Japan, nudity and sexuality were strictly prohibited. Former Nintendo president Hiroshi Yamauchi believed that if the company allowed the licensing of pornographic games, the company's image would be forever tarnished. Nintendo of America went further and games released for Nintendo consoles could not feature nudity, sexuality, profanity (including racism, sexism or slurs), blood, graphic or domestic violence, drugs, political messages, or religious symbols—with the exception of widely unpracticed religions, such as the Greek Pantheon. The Japanese parent company was concerned that it may be viewed as a "Japanese invasion" by forcing Japanese community standards on North American and European children. Past the strict guidelines, some exceptions have occurred: Bionic Commando (though swastikas were eliminated in the US version), Smash TV and Golgo 13: Top Secret Episode contain human violence, the latter also containing implied sexuality and tobacco use, River City Ransom and Taboo: The Sixth Sense contain nudity, and the latter also contains religious images, as do Castlevania II and III.

Nintendo's content policy is responsible for the Genesis version of Mortal Kombat having more than double the unit sales of the Super NES version, largely due to Nintendo forcing its publisher Acclaim to recolor red blood to look like white sweat within the game and to tone down its gorier and more violent graphics. By contrast, Sega allowed blood and gore to remain in the Genesis version (though a code is required to unlock the gore). Nintendo allowed the Super NES version of Mortal Kombat II to ship uncensored the following year with a content warning on the packaging. Early Megami Tensei titles were not localized for the West due to Nintendo's content guidelines regarding religious symbols. The first Megami Tensei title to be localized was the Virtual Boy title Jack Bros., with mainline titles receiving localizations starting with Shin Megami Tensei: Strange Journey in 2010; the series, along with the spin-off Persona games, have since seen releases on Nintendo platforms worldwide with Shin Megami Tensei V becoming a Nintendo Switch exclusive on release, and Persona 5 Royal receiving a Switch release.

Video game rating systems were introduced with the Entertainment Software Rating Board (ESRB) of 1994 and the Pan European Game Information of 2003, and Nintendo discontinued most of its censorship policies in favor of consumers making their own choices. Today changes to the content of games are done primarily by the game's developer or, occasionally, at the request of Nintendo. The only clear-set rule is that ESRB AO-rated games will not be licensed on Nintendo consoles in North America, a practice which is also enforced by Sony and Microsoft, its greatest competitors in the present market. Nintendo has since allowed several mature-content games to be published on its consoles, including Perfect Dark, Conker's Bad Fur Day, the Doom series, BMX XXX, the Resident Evil series, Killer7, the Mortal Kombat series, the Wolfenstein series, Eternal Darkness: Sanity's Requiem, BloodRayne, Geist, Dementium: The Ward, Bayonetta 2, Devil's Third, and Fatal Frame: Maiden of Black Water.

Certain games have continued to be modified, however. For example, Konami was forced to remove all references to cigarettes in the 2000 Game Boy Color game Metal Gear: Ghost Babel (although the previous NES version of Metal Gear, the GameCube game Metal Gear Solid: The Twin Snakes, and the 3DS game Metal Gear Solid 3: Snake Eater 3D, included such references), and maiming and blood were removed from the Nintendo 64 port of Cruis'n USA. Another example is in the Game Boy Advance game Mega Man Zero 3, in which one of the bosses, called Hellbat Schilt in the Japanese and European releases, was renamed Devilbat Schilt in the North American localization. In North American releases of the Mega Man Zero games, enemies and bosses killed with a saber attack do not gush blood as they do in the Japanese versions. However, the release of the Wii was accompanied by several even more controversial games, such as Manhunt 2, No More Heroes, The House of the Dead: Overkill, and MadWorld, the latter three of which were initially published exclusively for the console. The Call of Duty franchise, which features strong violence – including depictions of blood and gore – also saw releases on the Wii, Wii U. and Nintendo Switch 2.

Some otherwise mature-rated titles published for the Nintendo Switch and its successor, the Nintendo Switch 2, were not subject to content modification; games like CD Projekt Red's The Witcher 3: Wild Hunt and Cyberpunk 2077 have been released, unmodified, for both consoles. In 2026, Dispatch was released for both consoles, censored, with its developers stating Nintendo's "content policies" as a reason, leading to a renewed discussion around them. In June, AdHoc released a content update for the game that reverted most, but not all, of the censorship.

=== License guidelines ===
Nintendo of America also had guidelines before 1993 that had to be followed by its licensees to make games for the Nintendo Entertainment System, in addition to the above content guidelines. Guidelines were enforced through the 10NES lockout chip. The license guidelines stated that:

- Licensees were not permitted to release the same game for a competing console until two years had passed.
- Nintendo would decide how many cartridges would be supplied to the licensee.
- Nintendo would decide how much space would be dedicated such as for articles and advertising in the Nintendo Power magazine.
- There was a minimum number of cartridges that had to be ordered by the licensee from Nintendo.
- There was a yearly limit of five games that a licensee may produce for a Nintendo console. This rule was created to prevent market over-saturation, which had contributed to the video game crash of 1983.

The last rule was circumvented in several ways; for example, Konami, wanting to produce more games for Nintendo's consoles, formed Ultra Games and later Palcom to produce more games as a technically different publisher. This disadvantaged smaller or emerging companies, as they could not afford to start more companies. In another side effect, Square Co. (now Square Enix) executives have suggested that the price of publishing games on the Nintendo 64 along with the degree of censorship and control which Nintendo enforced over its games, most notably Final Fantasy VI, were factors in switching its focus towards Sony's PlayStation console.

In 1993, a class action suit was taken against Nintendo under allegations that its lockout chip enabled unfair business practices. The case was settled, with the condition that California consumers were entitled to a $3 discount coupon for a game of Nintendo's choice.

=== Intellectual property protection ===
Nintendo has generally been proactive in ensuring that its intellectual property in both hardware and software is protected. Nintendo's protection of its properties began as early as the arcade release of Donkey Kong which was widely cloned on other platforms, a practice common to the most popular arcade games of the era. Nintendo did seek legal action to try to stop the release of these unauthorized clones but estimated it still lost $100 million in potential sales to these clones. Since then, Nintendo has been proactive in preventing copyright infringement of its games by video game emulators and fan games and other works using the company's intellectual property. The company has also suffered from various data breaches and has sought action against those that have released these leaks.

=== Seal of Quality ===
Nintendo Seal of Quality

Seal in NTSC regions

Seal in PAL regions

The gold sunburst seal was first used by Nintendo of America, and later by Nintendo of Europe. It is displayed on any game, system, or accessory licensed for use on one of its video game consoles, denoting the game has been properly approved by Nintendo. The seal is also displayed on any Nintendo-licensed merchandise, such as trading cards, game guides, or apparel, albeit with the words "Official Nintendo Licensed Product".

In 2008, game designer Sid Meier cited the Seal of Quality as one of the three most important innovations in video game history, as it helped set a standard for game quality that protected consumers from shovelware.

==== NTSC regions ====
In NTSC regions, this seal is an elliptical starburst named the "Official Nintendo Seal". Originally, for NTSC countries, the seal was a large, black and gold circular starburst. The seal read as follows: "This seal is your assurance that NINTENDO has approved and guaranteed the quality of this product." This seal was later altered in 1988: "approved and guaranteed" was changed to "evaluated and approved". In 1989, the seal became gold and white, as it currently appears, with a shortened phrase, "Official Nintendo Seal of Quality". It was changed in 2003 to read "Official Nintendo Seal".

The seal currently reads:

The official seal is your assurance that this product is licensed or manufactured by Nintendo. Always look for this seal when buying video game systems, accessories, games, and related products.

==== PAL regions ====
In PAL regions, the seal is a circular starburst named the "Original Nintendo Seal of Quality". Text near the seal in the Australian Wii manual states:

This seal is your assurance that Nintendo has reviewed this product and that it has met our standards for excellence in workmanship, reliability, and entertainment value. Always look for this seal when buying games and accessories to ensure complete compatibility with your Nintendo product.

=== Charitable projects ===
In 1992, Nintendo teamed with the Starlight Children's Foundation to build Starlight Fun Center mobile entertainment units and install them in hospitals. By the end of 1995, 1,000 Starlight Nintendo Fun Center units were installed. The units combine several forms of multimedia entertainment including gaming, and aim to boost children's morale during hospital stays.

=== Environmental record ===
Nintendo has consistently been ranked last in Greenpeace's "Guide to Greener Electronics" due to its failure to publish information. Similarly, it is ranked last in the Enough Project's "Conflict Minerals Company Rankings" due to Nintendo's refusal to respond to multiple requests for information.

Like many other electronics companies, Nintendo offers a recycling program for customers to mail in unused products. Nintendo of America claimed 548 tons of returned products in 2011, 98% of which became reused or recycled.

== Legal issues ==
Starting in 1989, the Federal Trade Commission investigated Nintendo for vertical price-fixing. Nintendo agreed to settle in 1991 for US$25,000,000 in the form of an "instant redemption certificate" for consumers who had bought Nintendo consoles between June 1, 1988, and December 31, 1990.

In 2002, the European Commission fined Nintendo and its distribution partners including Scottish company John Menzies for price fixing between European single market countries from 1991 to 1998 following a two-year probe. Nintendo appealed the penalty due to the fine amount of 149 million euros and John Menzies, fined 18 million euros, was considering legal options. John Menzies received an out-of-court settlement from Nintendo in 2003, arguing it followed Nintendo's policy. In 2009, the General Court reduced Nintendo's fine to 119 million euro as well as those of the distributors including John Menzies, but the 4.5 million euros fine of Itochu through its Greek subsidiary Itochu Hellas remained unchanged.

In July 2026, Nintendo faced a class-action lawsuit regarding retained U.S. government tariff refunds that had previously increased consumer costs for Switch hardware and accessories. The company filed a motion to dismiss, arguing consumers were not entitled to the funds because they received products at the agreed-upon retail price.

== Legacy ==
The Nintendo Difference: Nintendo's Impact On Gaming

"Nearly every generation, Nintendo has led a charge of innovation that has fundamentally reshaped the gaming world. These innovations haven't always been well received, but Nintendo's fingerprints are so firmly etched into our industry, that the company is arguably the most important figure in it."

— Ben Reeves, Game Informer

It is considered that Hiroshi Yamauchi's strategic decisions, mainly to take Nintendo into the world of electronic games, ensured not only the success of his company but the survival of the industry as a whole, as it "restored public confidence in electronic games after the gloomy collapse of the U.S. market in the early 1980s". The company was already the most successful in Japan by 1991, with its products having "redefined the way we play games" and its business model having prioritized title sales strategies over consoles, unlike what most distributors at the time were doing.

Its social responsibility policy and philosophy focused on quality and innovation have already led to Nintendo being classified as a "consumer-centric manufacturer", something that has allowed it to differentiate itself from its direct competitors, Sony and Microsoft. Forbes magazine has since 2013 included Nintendo in its list of the "World's Best Employers", which takes into consideration work environment and staff diversity. Time magazine in turn chose Nintendo in 2018 as one of the "50 Genius Companies" of the year, saying that "resurrection" has become a "habit" of the company and highlighting the success of the Nintendo Switch over the Wii U. Its capital in 2018 exceeded ten billion yen and net sales were over nine billion dollars, mostly in the North American market, making it one of Japan's richest and most valuable companies.

Nintendo characters have had a significant impact on contemporary popular culture. Mario is a symbol of the gaming industry, as well as a "cultural icon." According to John Taylor of Arcadia Investment Corp. the character "is by far the biggest single property in electronic gaming." Other prominent company characters include Princess Peach, Pikachu, Link, Donkey Kong, Kirby, and Samus Aran.

== See also ==
- PlayStation
- Xbox
- Sega
- Atari
- SNK
- Super Nintendo World
- Illumination
- Lewis Galoob Toys, Inc. v. Nintendo of America, Inc.
- Universal City Studios, Inc. v. Nintendo Co., Ltd.
