= History of Nintendo =

The Nintendo logo since May 11, 2016

The history of Nintendo, a Japanese video game company based in Kyoto, starts in 1889 when Fusajiro Yamauchi founded "Yamauchi Nintendo", a producer of hanafuda playing cards. Sekiryo Kaneda was company president from 1929 to 1949. His successor Hiroshi Yamauchi had Nintendo producing toys like the Ultra Hand, and video games, including arcade games, the Color TV-Game series of home game consoles (1977–83), and the Game & Watch series of handheld electronic games (1980–86).

Shigeru Miyamoto designed Donkey Kong (1981) for arcades: Nintendo's first international hit game, and origin of the company's mascot, Mario. After the American video game crash of 1983, Nintendo filled a market gap there by releasing their Japanese Famicom home console (1983) as the Nintendo Entertainment System (NES) in 1985. Miyamoto and Takashi Tezuka's innovative Famicom/NES titles, Super Mario Bros. and The Legend of Zelda, greatly influenced gaming. The Game Boy handheld console (1989) and the Super Nintendo Entertainment System home console (1990) were successful, yet Nintendo had an intense business rivalry with Sega's consoles. The Virtual Boy (1995), a portable console with stereoscopic 3D graphics, was a critical and financial failure. With the Nintendo 64 (1996), Nintendo began making games with fully-3D computer graphics. The Pokémon media franchise, partially owned by Nintendo, has been a worldwide hit since 1996.

The Game Boy Advance (2001) was another success. The GameCube home console (2001), while popular with Nintendo's fans, sold poorly compared to Sony and Microsoft's competing consoles. In 2002, Satoru Iwata became president, leading development of the Nintendo DS handheld (2004) with a touchscreen, and the Wii home console (2006) with a motion controller; both were extraordinarily successful. Wii Sports remains Nintendo's best-selling game. The Nintendo 3DS handheld (2011) successfully retried stereoscopic 3D. The Wii U home console (2012) sold poorly, putting Nintendo's future as a manufacturer in doubt, and influencing its entry into mobile gaming. Before dying in 2015, Iwata led development of the successful Nintendo Switch (2017), a hybrid home/handheld console. Tatsumi Kimishima succeeded him, followed by Shuntaro Furukawa in 2018. The Nintendo Switch 2 released in 2025.

== 1889–1949: Hanafuda cards ==
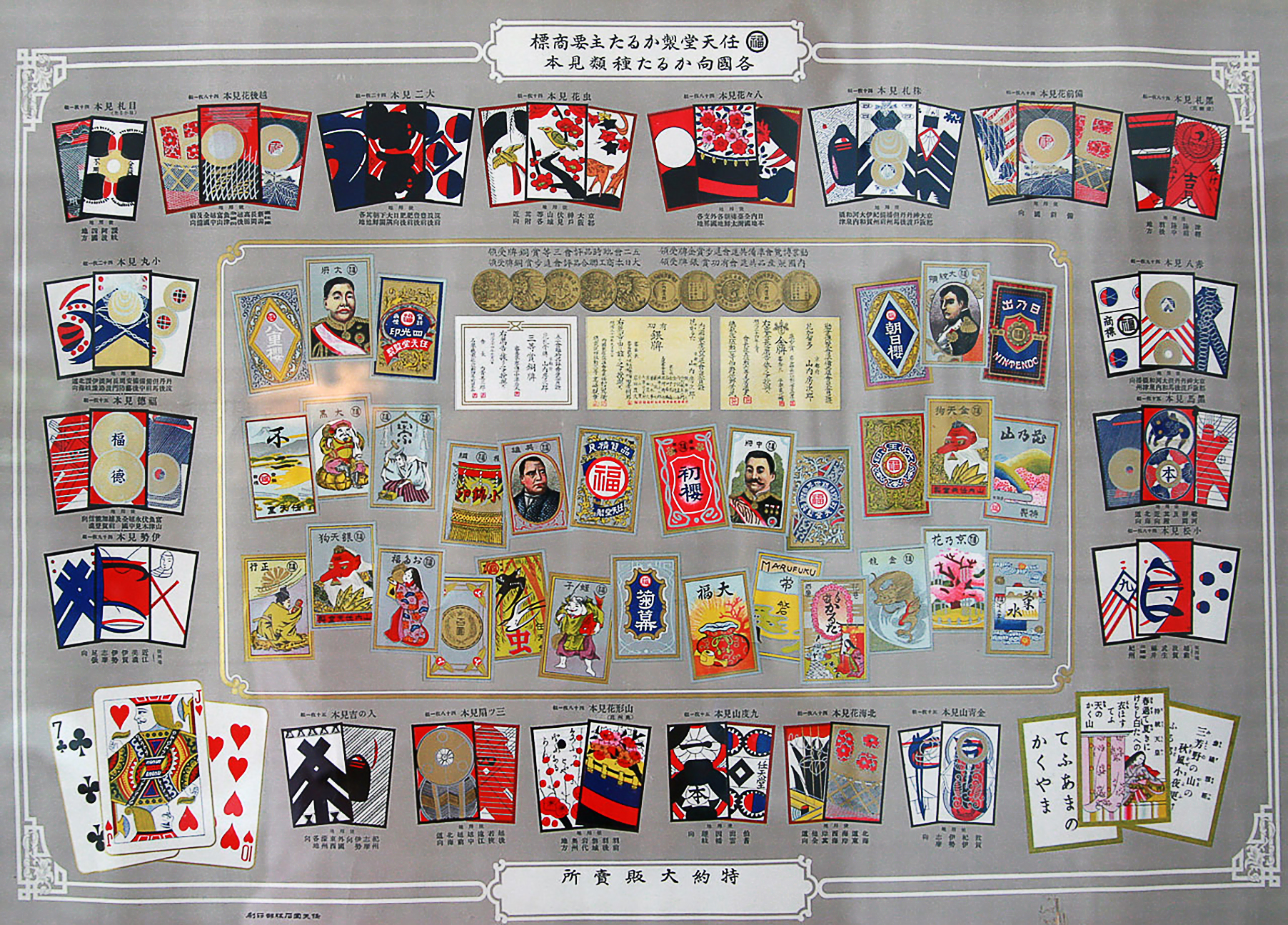
Nintendo poster from early Meiji Era, showing the company's hanafuda cards

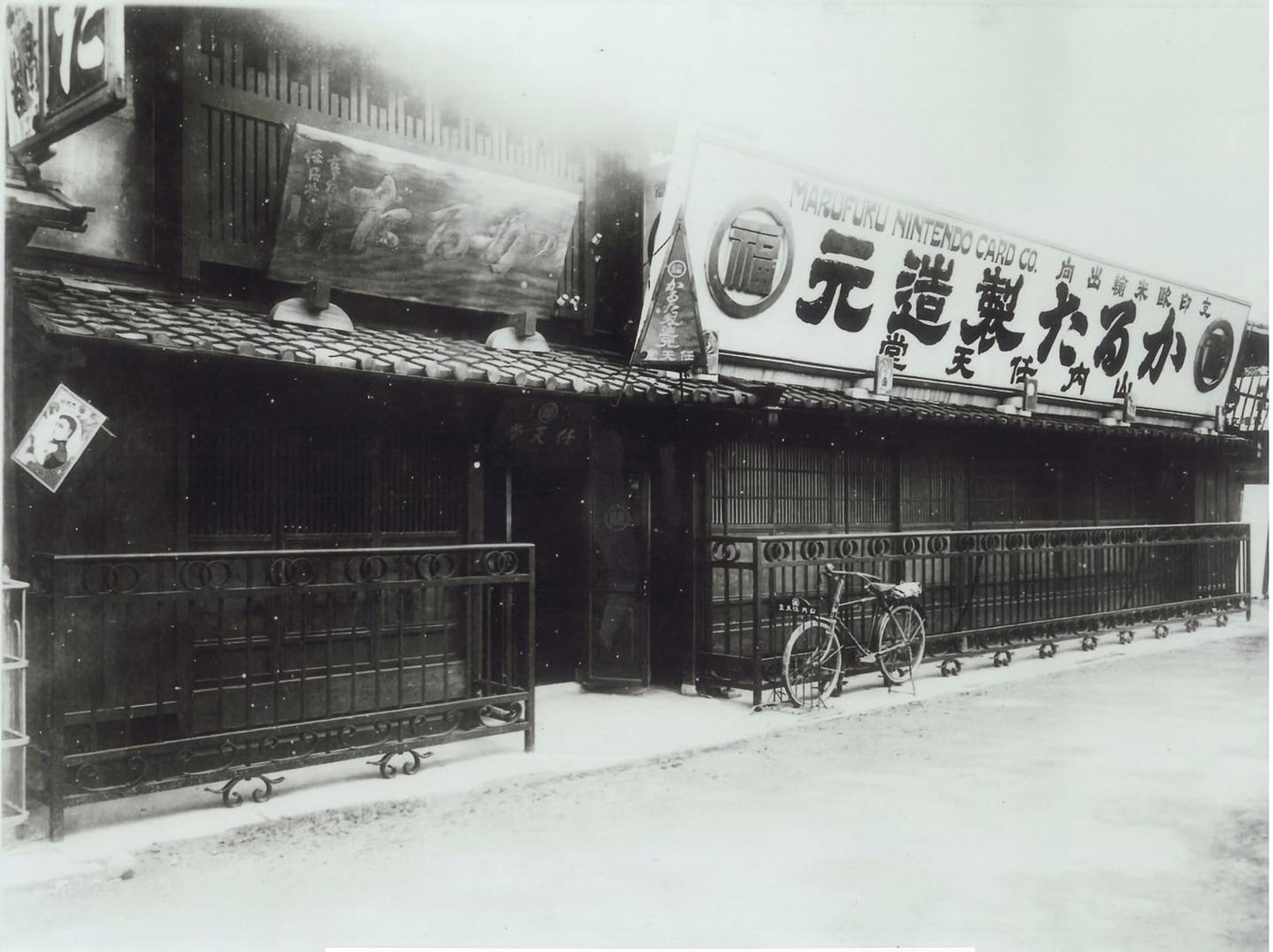
Nintendo's first headquarters was in Kyoto (1889).

Nintendo was founded as Yamauchi Nintendo (山内任天堂) by Fusajiro Yamauchi on September 23, 1889, though it was originally named Nintendo Koppai. Based in Kyoto, Japan, the business produced and marketed hanafuda, a type of Japanese playing card. The name "Nintendo" is commonly assumed to mean "leave luck to heaven", but there are no historical records to validate this. Hanafuda cards were an alternative to Western-style playing cards which were banned in Japan at the time. Nintendo's cards gained popularity, so Yamauchi hired assistants to mass-produce them.

Fusajiro Yamauchi did not have a son to take over the family business. Following the common Japanese tradition of mukoyōshi, he adopted his son-in-law, Sekiryo Kaneda, who then legally took his wife's last name of Yamauchi. In 1929, Fusajiro Yamauchi retired and allowed Kaneda to take over as president. In 1933, Sekiryo Kaneda established a joint venture with another company and renamed it Yamauchi Nintendo & Co.

Nintendo's headquarters were almost destroyed in 1945, during World War II, when the United States military was preparing to use their newly invented nuclear bomb on a Japanese city; Kyoto was the top city considered by the military for an attack, but U.S. Secretary of War Henry L. Stimson removed it as a potential target due to his appreciation of the city.

In 1947, Sekiryo established a distribution company, Marufuku Co., Ltd., to distribute the hanafuda and several other types of cards produced by Nintendo. Sekiryo Kaneda also had only daughters, so again his son-in-law (Shikanojo Inaba, renamed Shikanojo Yamauchi) was adopted into the family. Yamauchi later abandoned his family and did not become company president. Subsequently, his son Hiroshi Yamauchi was raised by his grandparents, and he later took over the company instead of his father.

== 1949–1966: Disney partnership and public listing ==
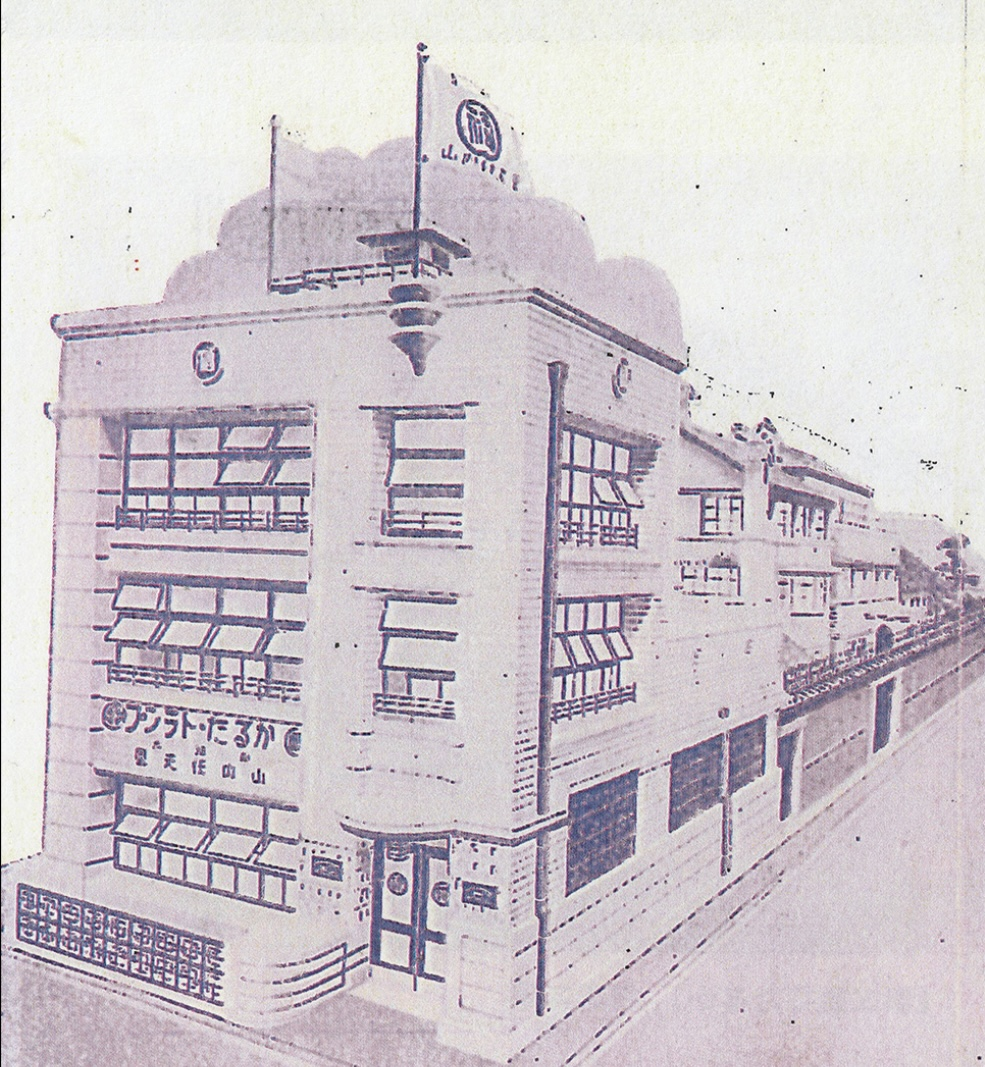
Nintendo's second headquarters from 1933-1959

In 1949, Hiroshi Yamauchi attended Waseda University in Tokyo. However, after his grandfather suffered a debilitating stroke, he left to take office as the president of Nintendo. In 1950, he renamed Marufuku Co. Ltd. to "Nintendo Kuruta". In 1953, Nintendo became the first company in Japan to produce playing cards from plastic.

In 1956, Yamauchi visited the U.S., to engage in talks with the United States Playing Card Company (USPCC), the dominant playing card manufacturer in the United States, based in Cincinnati. He was shocked to find that the world's biggest company in his business was relegated to using a small office. This was a turning point for Yamauchi, who then realized the limitations of the playing card business.

In 1958, Nintendo made a deal with Disney to allow the use of Disney's characters on Nintendo's playing cards. Previously, Western playing cards were regarded as something similar to hanafuda and mahjong: a device for gambling. By tying playing cards to Disney and selling books explaining the different games playable with the cards, Nintendo could sell the product to Japanese households. The tie-in was a success and the company sold at least 600,000 card packs in one year. Due to this success, in 1962, Yamauchi took Nintendo public, listing the company in Osaka Stock Exchange Second division.

In 1960, Nintendo operated a taxi company in Kyoto known as "Daiya Taxi". It was sold off due to difficulties with the labor unions that made it hard to manage the company. Currently, "Daiya Taxi" is owned by Daiya Transportation Co. Ltd.

In 1963, Yamauchi shortened the company's name from "Nintendo Playing Card Co., Ltd." to "Nintendo." Following this name change, Nintendo started to begin experimenting in other areas of business using the newly injected capital. This included establishing a food company in partnership with two other firms, with a product line featuring instant rice (similar to instant noodles), and a vacuum cleaner called Chiritory.

While many sources have reported that Nintendo owned a chain of love hotels during this period, an investigation by a Japanese blogger as well as Nintendo historian Isao Yamazaki found that there was no evidence of this in any of Nintendo's securities reports dating to 1962, which detail the many other businesses, nor any contemporary newspapers. The claim appears to have originated in David Sheff's book Game Over (first published in 1993), which alleged that Yamauchi opened a love hotel of which he was the most frequent patron. Sheff's book was a narrative constructed based primarily on direct interviews, leaving his source unclear, and the claim was not present in contemporary Japanese books detailing Nintendo's history.

All of Nintendo's other business ventures eventually failed. Toymaking, however, succeeded based on prior experience in the playing card business. In 1964, while Japan was experiencing an economic boom due to the Tokyo Olympics, the playing card business reached saturation. Japanese households stopped buying playing cards, and the price of Nintendo stock fell from 900 yen to 60 yen.

In 1965, Nintendo hired Gunpei Yokoi as a Maintenance Engineer for the assembly line. However, Yokoi soon became famous for much more than his ability to repair conveyor belts.

== 1966–1972: Toy company and new ventures ==
During the 1960s, Nintendo struggled to survive in the Japanese toy industry, which was still small at this point, and already dominated by already well-established companies such as Bandai and Tomy. Because of the generally short product life cycle of toys, the company took the approach of introducing new products at a quicker rate, marking the beginning of a major new era for Nintendo.

In 1966, Yamauchi, upon visiting one of the company's hanafuda factories, noticed an extending arm-shaped toy, which had been made by one of its maintenance engineers, Gunpei Yokoi, for his own enjoyment. Yamauchi ordered Yokoi to develop it as a proper product for the Christmas rush. Released as the Ultra Hand, it became one of Nintendo's earliest toy blockbusters, selling over hundreds of thousands units. Seeing that Yokoi had potential, Yamauchi pulled him off assembly line work. Yokoi was soon moved from maintenance duty to product development.

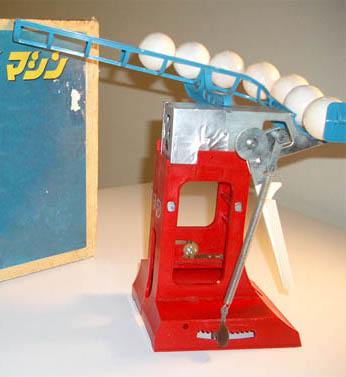
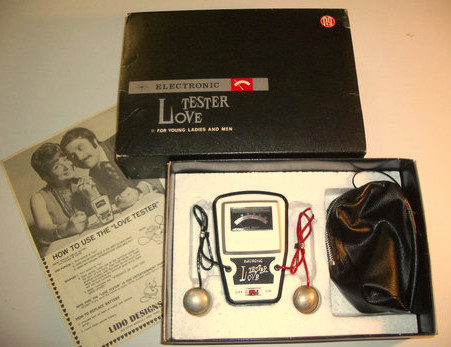
The Ultra Machine and the Love Tester for adults are two commercial toys made by Nintendo in the late 1960s.

Due to his electrical engineering background, it soon became apparent that Yokoi was quite adept at developing electronic toys. These devices had a much higher novelty value than traditional toys, allowing Nintendo to charge a higher price margin for each product. Yokoi went on to develop many other toys, including the Ten Billion Barrel puzzle, a baseball throwing machine called the Ultra Machine, and a Love Tester.

Nintendo released the first solar-powered light gun, the Nintendo Beam Gun, in 1970; this was the first commercially available light-gun for home use, produced in partnership with Sharp.

In 1972, Nintendo released the Ele-Conga, one of the first programmable drum machines. It plays pre-programmed rhythms from disc-shaped punch cards, which can be altered or programmed by the user, to play different patterns.

== 1972–1983: Arcade, Color TV-Game, and Game & Watch ==
=== Entrance into video games ===
Released in 1972, the first commercially available video game console, the Magnavox Odyssey, has a light gun accessory, the Shooting Gallery. This was the first involvement of Nintendo in video games. According to Martin Picard in the International Journal of Computer Game Research: "in 1971, Nintendo had—even before the marketing of the first home console in the United States—an alliance with the American pioneer Magnavox to develop and produce optoelectronic guns for the [Odyssey, since] it was similar to what Nintendo was able to offer in the Japanese toy market in 1970s".

In 1973, its focus shifted to family-friendly arcades with the Laser Clay Shooting System, using the same light gun technology used in Nintendo's Kousenjuu series of toys, and set up in abandoned bowling alleys. Gaining some success, Nintendo developed several more light gun machines for the emerging arcade scene. While the Laser Clay Shooting System ranges had to be shut down following excessive costs, Nintendo had founded a new market.

=== Color TV-Game consoles ===
In 1977, Nintendo released the Color TV-Game 6 and Color TV-Game 15, two consoles jointly developed with Mitsubishi Electric. The numbers in the console names indicate the number of games included in each. They were the start of the Color TV-Game line of console.

=== Shigeru Miyamoto and Donkey Kong (1981) ===
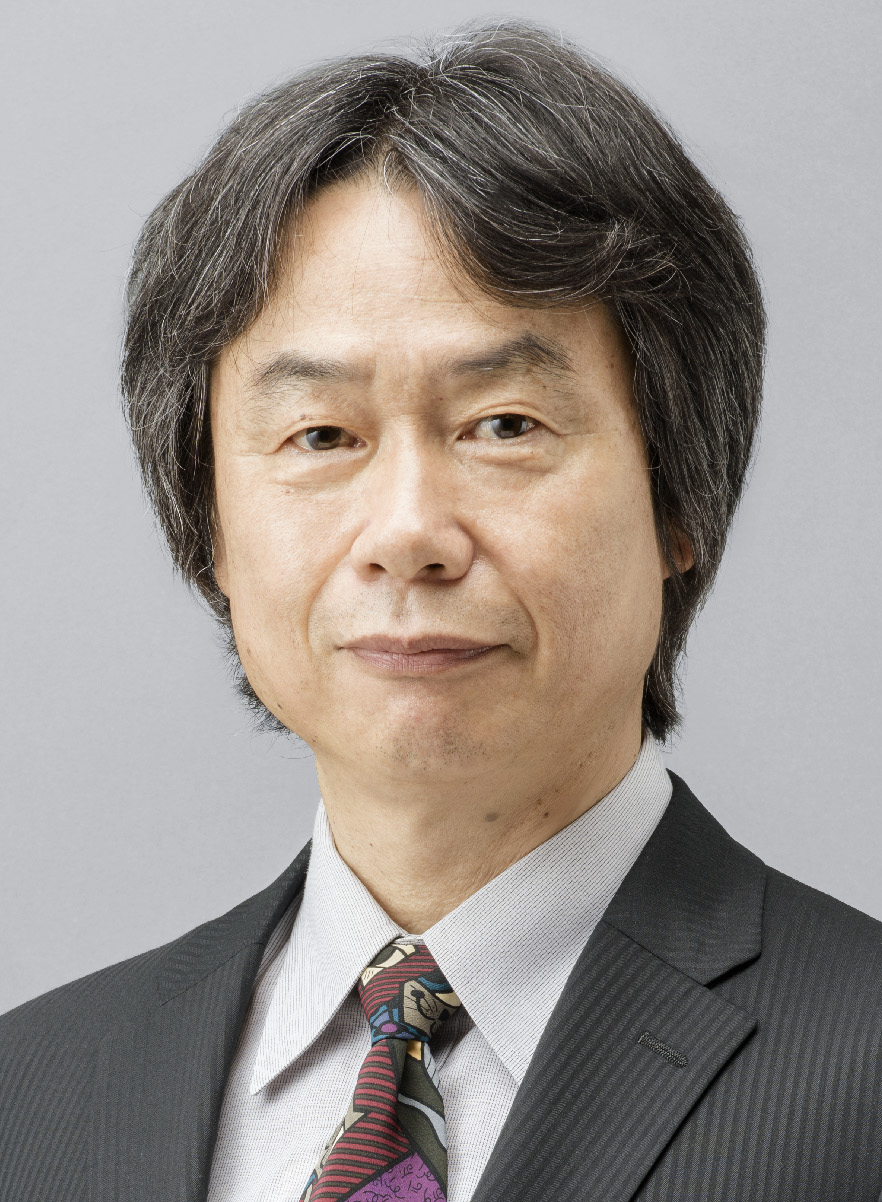
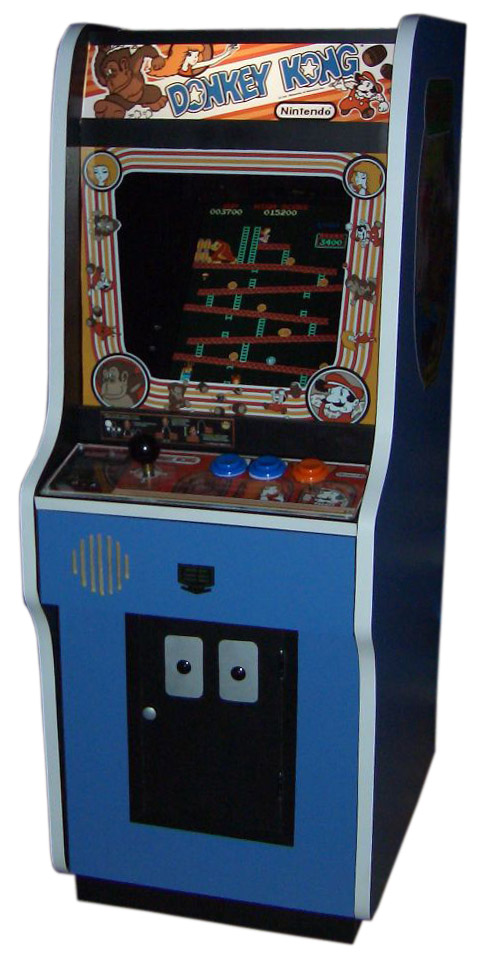
Shigeru Miyamoto created the 1981 game Donkey Kong.

In the early 1980s, Nintendo created some of its most famous arcade games. The massively popular Donkey Kong was designed by Shigeru Miyamoto and released in arcades in 1981. Home releases soon followed, made by Coleco for the Atari 2600, Intellivision, and ColecoVision video game systems. Some of Nintendo's other arcade games were ported to home consoles by third parties, including Donkey Kong Jr., and Mario Bros. Nintendo started to focus on the home game market. It stopped manufacturing and releasing arcade games in Japan in late 1985.

The release of Donkey Kong caused Universal Studios, Inc. to take legal action and sue Nintendo for copyright infringement on their character King Kong, which was actually in the public domain. The court sided with Nintendo in Universal City Studios, Inc. v. Nintendo Co., Ltd. Nintendo thanked their lawyer, John Kirby, by giving him a $30,000 boat called the Donkey Kong, along with "exclusive worldwide rights to use the name for sailboats," and named the character Kirby after him.

=== Game & Watch ===
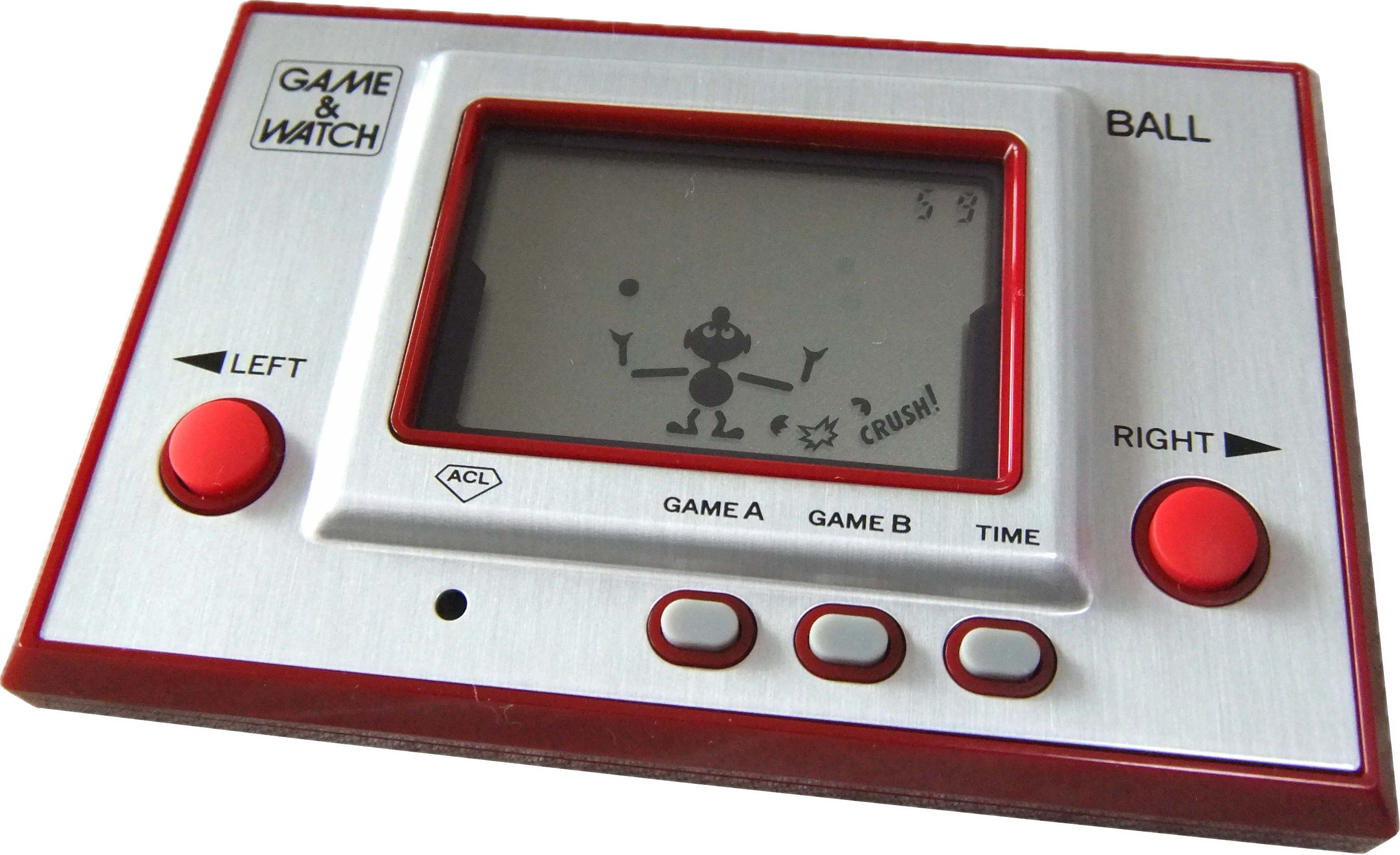
Ball (1980), the first release in the Game & Watch series

In addition to the arcade games, Nintendo was testing the consumer handheld video game market with the Game & Watch. It is a line of handheld electronic games produced by Nintendo from 1980 to 1991. Created by Gunpei Yokoi, each Game & Watch features a single game to be played on an LCD screen in addition to a clock or an alarm. It is the earliest Nintendo product to garner major success, with 43.4 million units sold worldwide.

== 1983–1989: Famicom and Nintendo Entertainment System ==
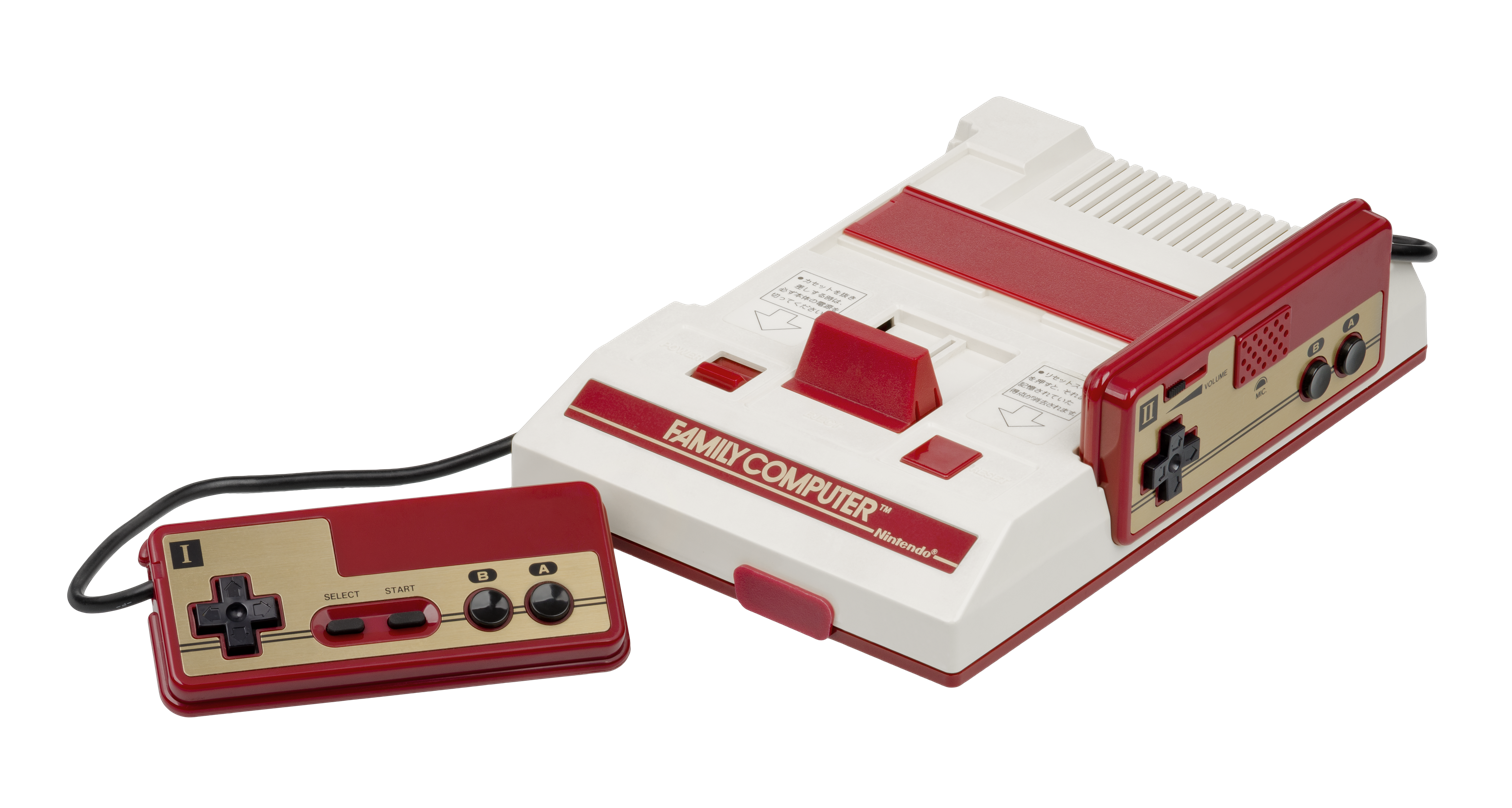
The Famicom, released in 1983

=== Famicom ===
In 1983, Nintendo released their first cartridge-based game console, the Family Computer or "Famicom", in Japan. More than 500,000 units were sold within two months. After a few months of favorable sales, Nintendo received complaints that some Famicom consoles would freeze on certain games. The fault was found in a malfunctioning chip and Nintendo decided to recall all Famicom units that were currently on store shelves.

=== Nintendo Entertainment System (NES) ===
In 1983, Nintendo was in negotiations with Atari, one of gaming's largest companies, to distribute the Famicom in the United States. However, right before the deal was finalized, Atari backed out of it after its executives visited the 1983 Consumer Electronics Show (CES) and saw a demonstration of Donkey Kong's port for the Coleco Adam home computer, Coleco being one of Atari's main competitors; the executives were unaware of the port beforehand. Atari began restarting negotiations later that year, but by then, Nintendo thought the partnership would be unsuccessful, given what just happened to the United States' gaming market: from 1983 to 1985, the gaming industry, particularly in North America, experienced a large scale recession which greatly weakened its four major console manufacturers: Atari, with the Atari 2600; Coleco, with the ColecoVision; Magnavox, with the Odyssey 2; and Mattel Electronics with the Intellivision.

Nintendo decided to release the Famicom in North America without Atari's help. They renamed it the "Nintendo Advanced Video System" (AVS), and for a brief time before its launch, marketed it as a high-end home computer meant for gaming. Like similar computers at the time, it could connect to QWERTY and musical keyboards, and store data in a tape drive. The company first showed it to the public at the 1985 CES; reception to it was lukewarm, spurred by attendees' negative feelings towards gaming after the 1983 crash. Nintendo decided to redo the AVS' design, strictly making it a home game console, but which was marketed as dissimilar to America's existing consoles.

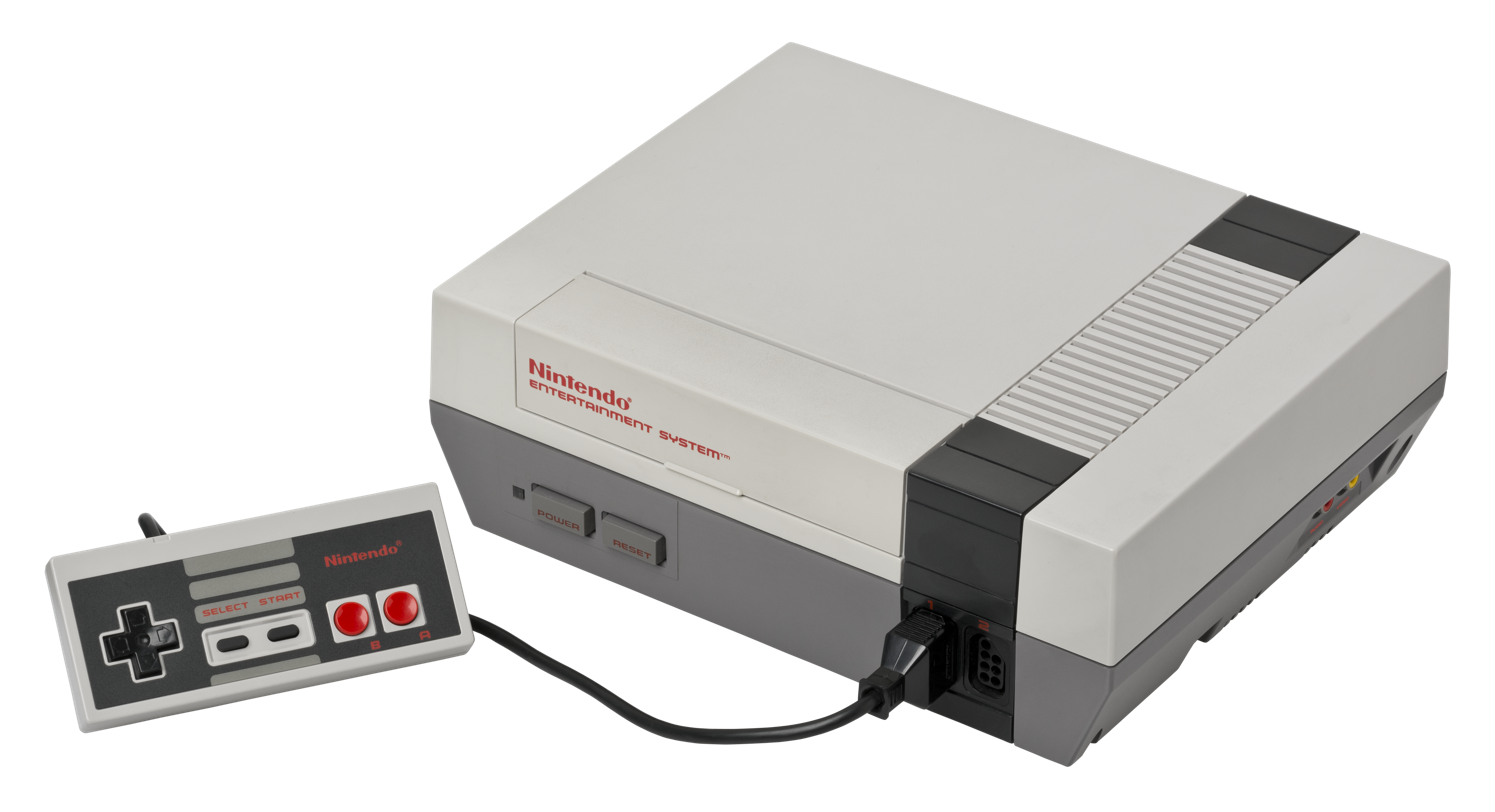
The Nintendo Entertainment System (NES), released in 1985

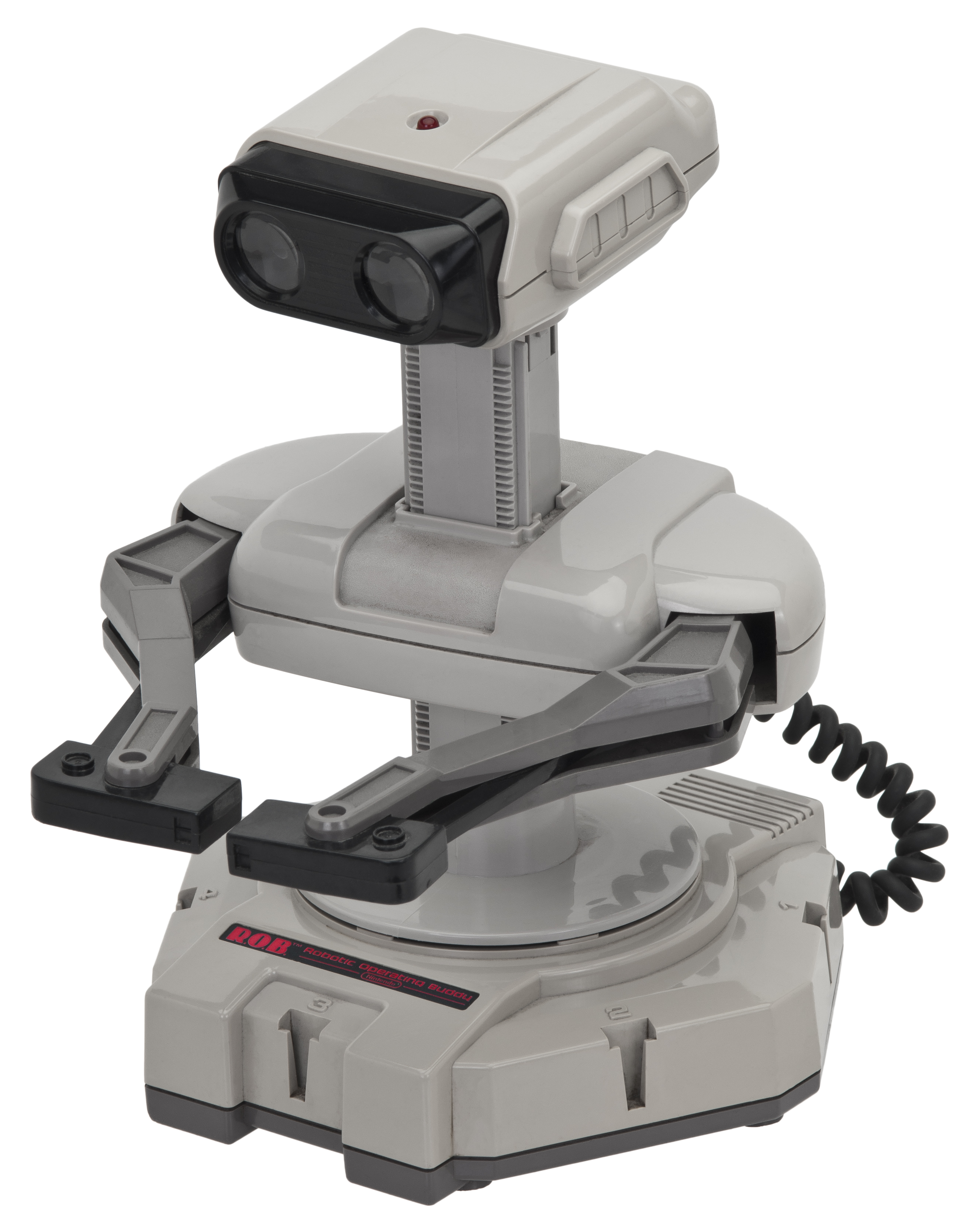
The R.O.B. peripheral for the console

It was renamed the "Nintendo Entertainment System" (NES), the phrase "entertainment system" intentionally used to avoid sounding like a console. Its games were referred to by Nintendo as "game paks" [sic] instead of cartridges, and they were inserted into a "control deck" instead of a console. To look similar to contemporary entertainment devices such as VCRs and stereo systems, the NES had a gray, boxy design with a "futuristic aesthetic". The company created R.O.B., a robot-shaped peripheral for the console, to market it as having another aspect than the games themselves.

Nintendo recognized that the 1983 crash was partially caused by the large amount of perceived low-quality games from third party developers being sold for American game consoles, so NES cartridges contained the patented "10NES" lockout chip: a chip on the cartridge's circuit board which connects to a corresponding chip within the console, once the cartridge is inserted—the console only plays a game if it detects the presence of the 10NES within its cartridge. The 10NES was only available to Nintendo and third party developers who Nintendo officially licensed to publish games for the system; third parties thus had to get the company's approval to make any NES game. The 10NES also prevented pirated versions of licensed games from running. After the console found success, an Atari subsidiary developer named Tengen found a way to reverse engineer the chip, and created their own version of it which theoretically let them publish unlicensed games for the NES; this did not ultimately happen, as Nintendo won a lawsuit against them for patent infringement.

A statement by Nintendo in a magazine about the "Seal of Quality" on NES games

Nintendo allowed third parties to make NES games if they released only five titles for the system per year, which did not feature gratuitous violence or intense depictions of controversial topics, such as religion. Games the company officially approved for the console were designated with a "Nintendo Seal of Quality" disclaimer on the front of its packaging. Nintendo put ads in magazines to encourage consumers to trust the seal a sign of a game's "excellence in workmanship, reliability, [and] entertainment value." They still use the seal on packaging.

Nintendo test marketed the NES in the New York City area in late 1985. The first unit sold at the console's launch event was to an employee of an unknown competing company, who also bought all 15 of NES' launch titles. It launched nationwide the following year.

As the console became known to American consumers, many of them started referring to it as "a Nintendo", and any other game consoles as "Nintendos". This worried the company, who predicted that if other consoles kept being called that, due to the Lanham Act, the trademark that allowed only Nintendo to use the name on consoles would be expired, and competitors could start selling their own "Nintendos"—much how like soda brands other than Coca-Cola are often sold in America as "Cokes". In 1990, the company put out posters in retailers nationwide, proclaiming: "There is no such a thing as a Nintendo. There's the Nintendo Entertainment System. There's Nintendo game software. [...] But there's no such thing as a Nintendo. You see, 'Nintendo' is an adjective, not a noun."

==== Super Mario Bros. and its sequels ====
One of the first games released for the NES was Super Mario Bros., directed by Shigeru Miyamoto and assistant directed by Takashi Tezuka. It began the Super Mario game series, and was one of the first side-scrolling platformers ever made. Historian Steven L. Kent writes:

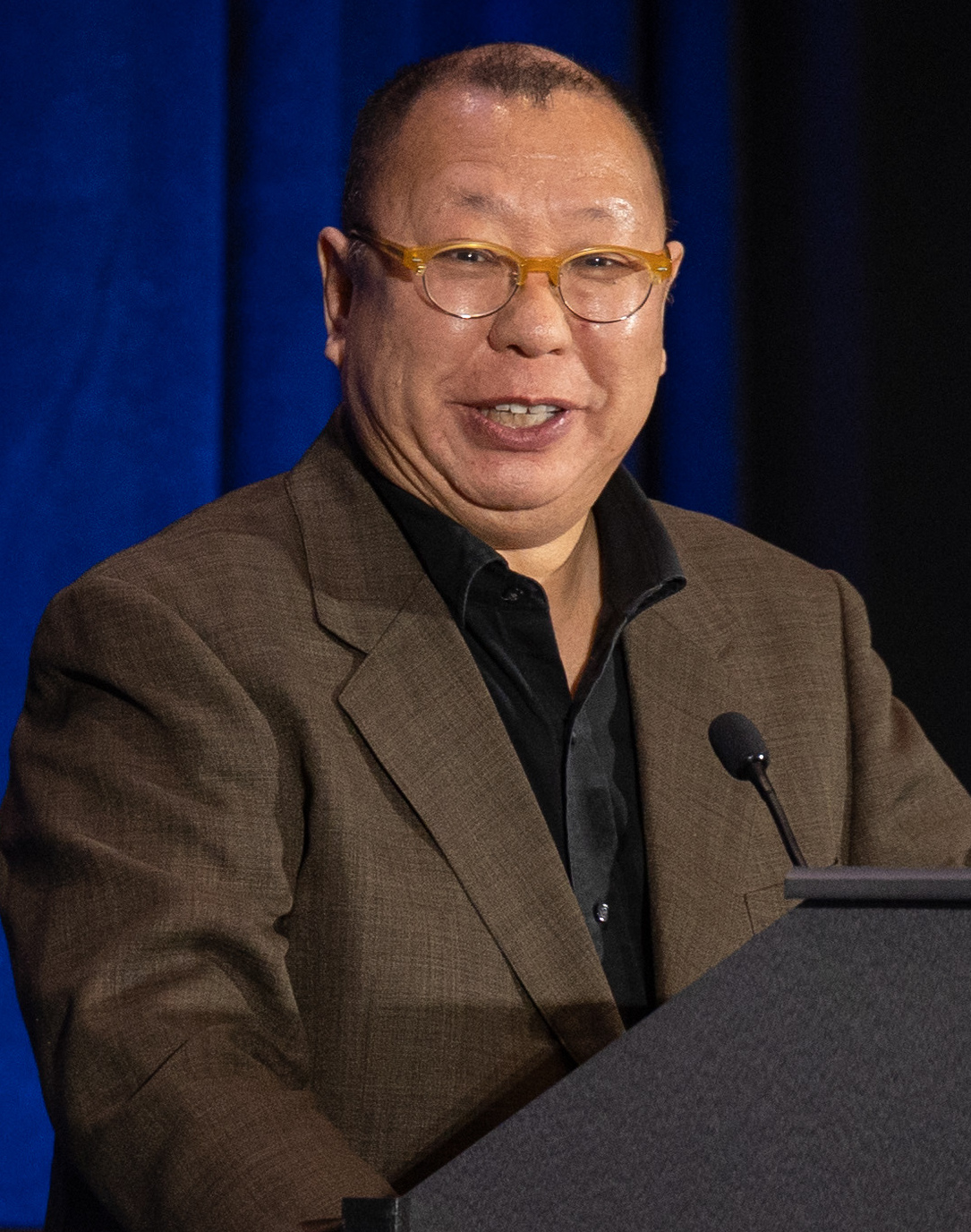
Takashi Tezuka was the assistant director of Super Mario Bros.

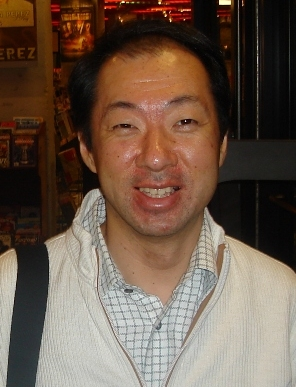
Koji Kondo composed the game's score

"[The game] took Mario out of his single-screen setting [from Donkey Kong and Mario Bros.] and placed him in a huge vivid world [...] players now controlled him as he ran through a seemingly endless, brightly coloured countryside filled with caverns, castles, and giant mushrooms. The landscape was much too expansive to fit on a screen."

It introduced the series' staple power-ups, collectible coins, punchable floating blocks, enemies which Mario can stomp on, as well as the characters Bowser and Princess Peach. Composer Koji Kondo influenced numerous game scores with his work on Super Mario Bros., which includes its iconic main theme. Using a program that could export music written in the BASIC programming language to a Famicom game, Kondo aimed to make attention-grabbing background music for the levels that never became tiring to listen to, even after repeating on short loops.

Digital Spy's Mark Langshaw writes that "gamers back in 1985 had never seen a platformer done so well" as Super Mario Bros. It became one of the most successful games ever released, selling 40 million copies. Nintendo has ported it to other consoles, "at virtually every opportunity". In 1986, Nintendo of America started releasing the NES version as a bundle with the system. Many writers claim that because Super Mario Bros. is responsible for the NES' success in North America, it is thus responsible for saving the North American gaming industry, after the 1983 crash made it seem bound to fail permanently.

A sequel, Super Mario Bros. 2 (1986), released for the Famicom, but not the NES, as Nintendo predicted Western gamers would find it "too difficult, too weird, or maybe too Japanese" compared to the first game. The "Super Mario Bros. 2" the West received in 1988 was a Mario-themed version of an unrelated Famicom game, Yume Kōjō: Doki Doki Panic (1987). This version was a success, prompting its own port back to the Famicom as Super Mario Bros. USA. Super Mario Bros. 3 (1988) released for both systems. It introduced many mechanics to the Mario series, and games as a whole, and has been labeled by many outlets as one of the best games of all time. Footage of its gameplay was first shown to American audiences as product placement in the 1989 gaming-themed film The Wizard.

==== The Legend of Zelda ====
Miyamoto, Tezuka, and Kondo also worked on The Legend of Zelda (1986) for the Famicom and NES. The game's core concept, of exploring the high fantasy setting of Hyrule, was inspired by Miyamoto's experiences in the countryside near Kyoto, his home city. Ryan Lambie writes for Den of Geek: "He wanted to reproduce in video game form the same sense of awe and excitement he felt when he explored [the countryside's] forests and caves as a kid, to introduce the pleasure of discovering things or the anxiety of becoming lost in a maze." The Legend of Zelda is an early nonlinear game, so the tasks required to complete it can be done in an order of the player's choosing. The player, controlling Link, traverses the open world of Hyrule to find pieces of the magical Triforce artifact in order to save Princess Zelda from Ganon. Similar to role-playing video games (RPGs)—which, until then, had mostly released for PCs instead of consoles—Zelda features "monsters, dungeons, missions to complete, [and] characters to converse with".

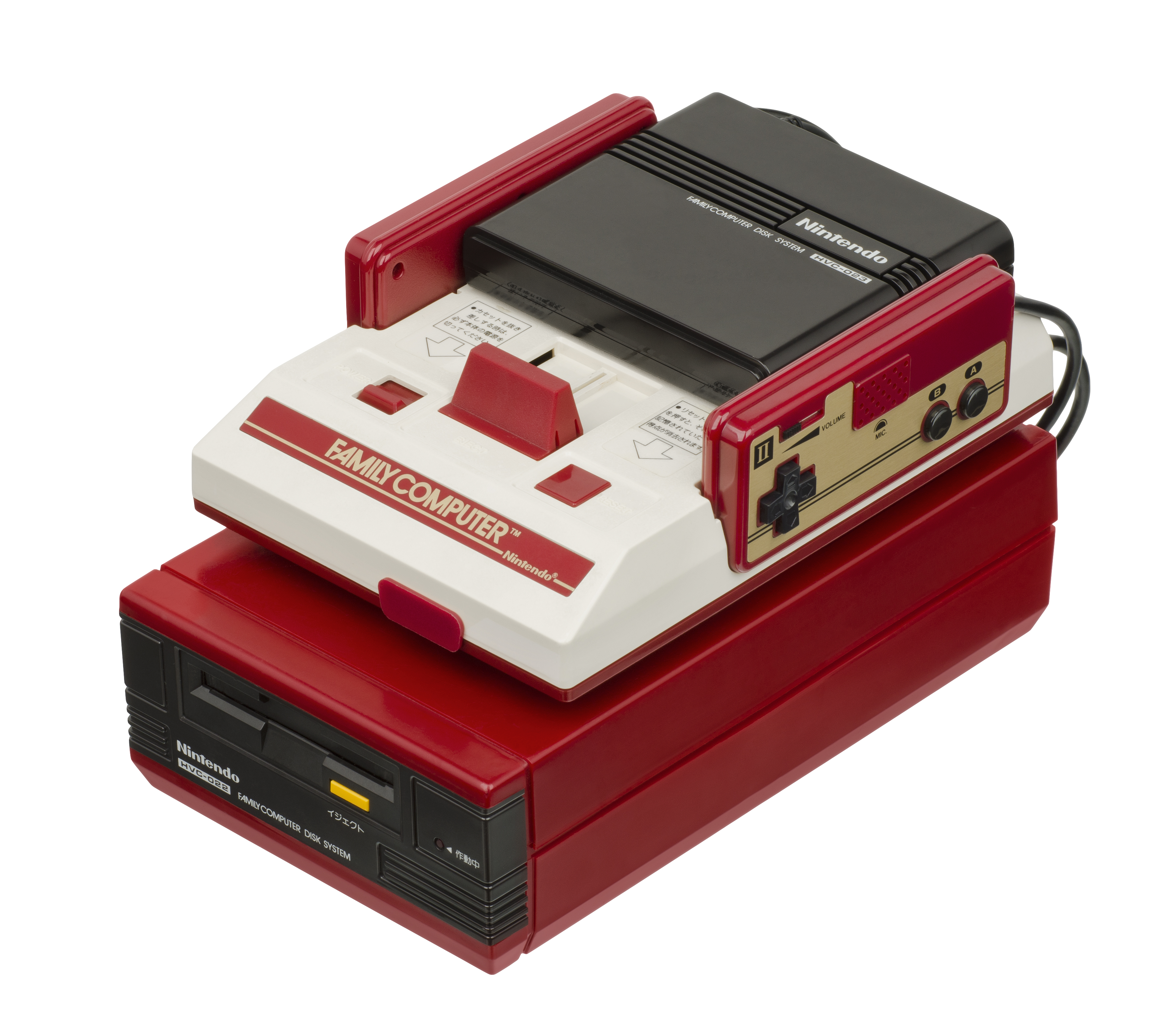
The Famicom Disk System (top), released in 1986, attached to a Famicom console (bottom)

The ambitious concept required more space than was available on Famicom, so, the game was released for the Famicom Disk System, a disk drive that can attach to the console and allow it to run floppy disks. Zelda's disk had a storage capacity of 112 kilobytes, far more than a standard Famicom cartridge. The game could run on a standard NES cartridge when it released for that system in 1987. As Zelda required more time to complete than any previous console game, it introduced a player's ability to save their progress in a game before turning off its console, then later returning to the game from where they left off. As the save system allowed for longer games, it laid the foundation for more complex storylines within console games.

==== Metroid ====
In 1986, Nintendo released Metroid, a 2D action-adventure game. It introduced a unique type of level design to the genre: the player character, Samus Aran, could explore the game world by navigating both X- and Y-axes of a large map—as opposed to previous action-adventures, which had players move in only one direction—which has a maze-like layout designed to feel claustrophobic. The map expands in size throughout a playthrough, as the player uses items and abilities they discover on the map to unlock gates which contain entryways to new areas. In 1987, Konami's game Castlevania II: Simon's Quest deviated from the first Castlevania (1986) by featuring level design similar to Metroid's. Metroid and Simon's Quest formed the basis of the long-lasting "Metroidvania" subgenre of games. Metroid is also notable for making Samus one of the first female main characters in an action game. Multiple outlets claim that the character changed many gamers' perceptions of women's roles in video game stories.

Nintendo Power's logo from 2005 to 2012

=== Nintendo Power ===
In 1988, Nintendo of America began publishing Nintendo Power, a bimonthly magazine with news about, and strategy guides to, games on Nintendo consoles. It was designed "primarily to promote upcoming Nintendo products", and contained prose that, Reeves Wiedeman writes for The New Yorker, "read like lightly repurposed promotional material from the company’s marketing department", although its staff had some amount of independence from Nintendo. The magazine soon gained a devoted readership, as it was one of the easiest ways for Nintendo fans to get information on upcoming releases. It also included gaming-themed posters, detailed walkthroughs for games, game reviews from critics (which were generally positive), and rankings of record high scores in various games that were submitted by readers. In 2007, Nintendo entered a contract to transfer the publishing and distribution of Nintendo Power to Future plc. The magazine ended publication in 2012, likely having shut down as gaming news had become more accessible via the Internet and mobile phones.

== 1989–1996: Game Boy, Super Nintendo Entertainment System, and Virtual Boy ==
=== Game Boy ===
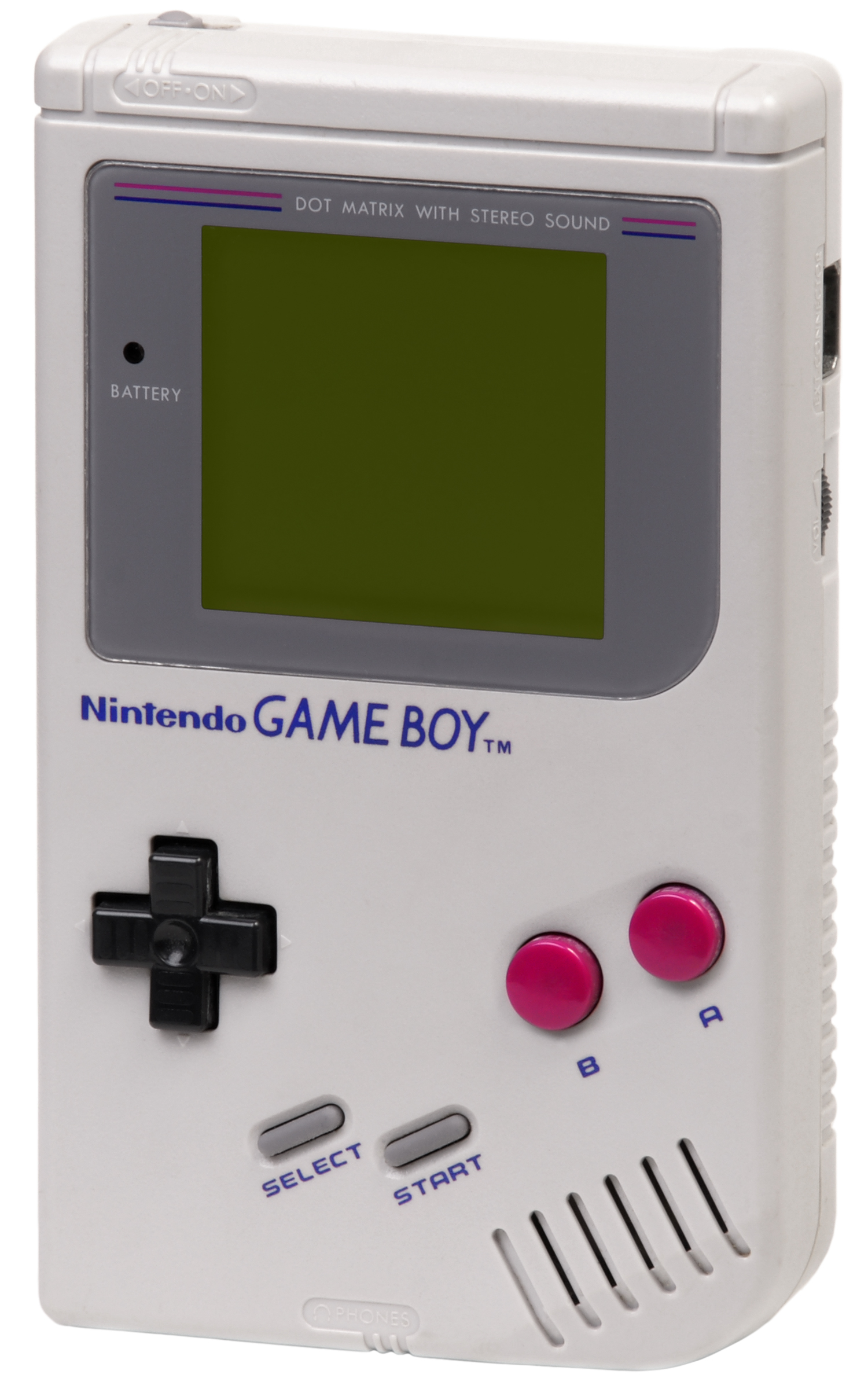
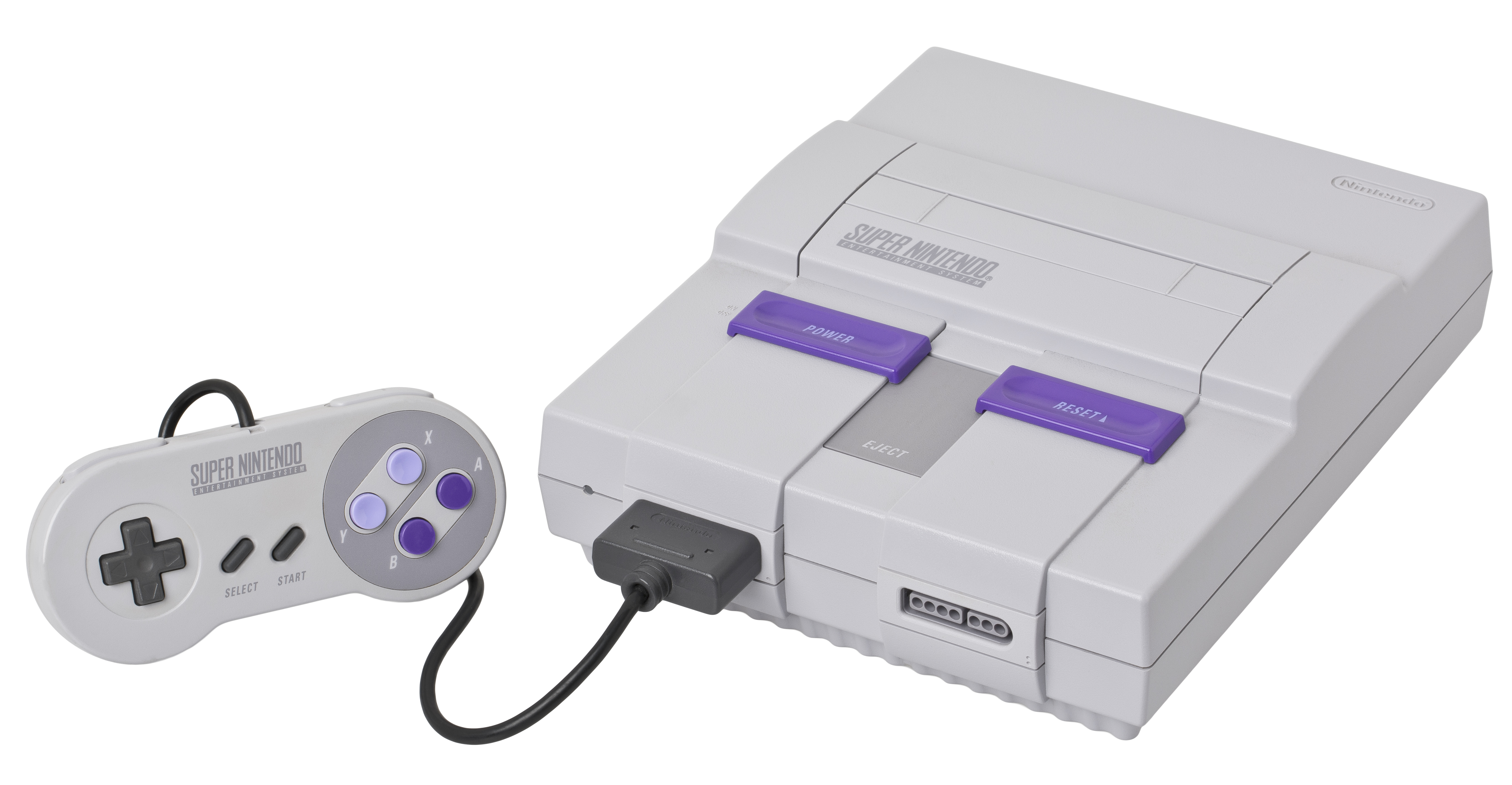
The Game Boy and Super Nintendo Entertainment System are Nintendo's fourth generation video game consoles.

In 1989, Nintendo released the Game Boy, along with the accompanying game Tetris. Due to the price, the game, and its durability (unlike the static and screen rot of the prior Microvision from Milton Bradley Company), the Game Boy line eventually amassed sales of 118 million units. Super Mario Land was released with the system, and 14 million copies were sold worldwide. Also in 1989, Nintendo announced a successor to the Famicom, the Super Famicom.

=== Super Nintendo Entertainment System (SNES) ===
The Super Famicom was released in Japan in 1990. It sold out across Japan within three days, with 1.6 million units sold by mid-1991. Later in 1991, the Super Famicom was launched in the U.S. as the "Super Nintendo Entertainment System" (SNES), followed by Europe in 1992. Like the NES, the Super Nintendo Entertainment System had high technical specifications for its era. The SNES controller was more ergonomic than that of the NES, as it now had rounded edges and four new buttons, a standard which is evident on many modern controllers today.

In 1991, Nintendo agreed to a settlement regarding price-fixing allegations brought by the Federal Trade Commission and attorneys general in New York and Maryland. Nintendo had been accused of threatening to cut off shipments of the NES to retailers who discounted the price of the system. The estimated cost of the settlement was just under $30 million.

=== Film and TV ventures ===
In the 1980s and 1990s, Nintendo licensed its intellectual properties (IPs) for five American TV shows produced by DiC: Captain N: The Game Master; The Super Mario Bros. Super Show!; King Koopa's Kool Kartoons; The Adventures of Super Mario Bros. 3; and Super Mario World. In 1993, the first film adaptation of a video game, Super Mario Bros., released in theaters. A live action film, it was a financial and critical failure, making Nintendo apprehensive about licensing their IPs for films for decades.

=== "Console war" with Sega ===
Around 1990, Nintendo occupied 80% of the global gaming market, the other 20% split among three other competitors; historian Frank Cifaldi writes that the "most promising of these" was Sega, a "scrappy little upstart" in Japan. Sega released their Sega Mega Drive home console in Japan in 1988. It launched in the U.S. as the "Sega Genesis". Initially, the Mega Drive "was making a modest name for itself" in Japan, whereas in America, the Genesis was "hardly making a dent in Nintendo's 8-bit empire" despite excited media coverage. Sega "ostensibly [had not] much to lose" when, in 1990, they hired former Mattel marketer Tom Kalinske to run Sega of America.

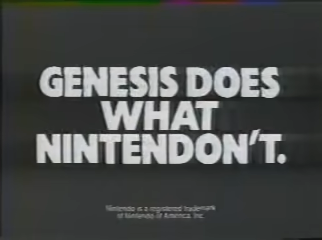
Still from a TV ad with the phrase "Genesis does what Nintendon't", one of many taglines and phrases Sega used to attack Nintendo's products

Kalinske and his team began an intense and unorthodox campaign that made Sega a viable competitor. The team decided not to focus on what they viewed as Nintendo's core demographic, younger children, and worked on making Sega seem cool to a teenage audience. Keith Stewart writes for The Guardian that Sega of America made themselves the "brash bad boy of the industry" with a print and TV ad campaign "that set out to belittle Nintendo and its quaint, family-orientated consoles". Their TV ads "went straight for the teenagers with [an] aggressive, rock music-driven, jump cut-filled" style, and directly targeted Nintendo, such as with the tagline "Genesis does what Nintendon't".

Sega toured malls across America, setting up demonstrations favorably comparing their games against Nintendo's. They alleged the Genesis was more powerful than the SNES due to a hardware feature known as "blast processing"; they marketed the phrase so intensely that Nintendo took out a two-page ad in various gaming magazines to rebut Sega's use of the phrase; in reality, it was a real feature which was unique to the Genesis, but did not provide the complete technological superiority over the SNES that Sega was claiming. Sega worked to get American game studios like Accolade, Electronic Arts (EA), and Spectrum Holobyte to develop Genesis-exclusive titles. Developers moving to the Genesis forced Nintendo to remove some of its stringent game licensing standards made for the NES' launch, such as developers not being allowed to publish a game on both Nintendo's and a competitor's consoles.

Eventually, the Genesis became the most popular game console in the U.S., and Nintendo's market share dropped to approximately 45%. However, the SNES ultimately sold 49.10 million units worldwide, compared to the Genesis' estimated 40 million. By 1993, Nintendo had reportedly become one of the top ten leading companies in the world.

=== 1993—94 U.S. Senate hearings on video games ===
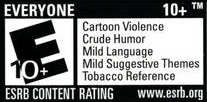
Nintendo and Sega, among others, successfully lobbied the U.S. Congress from censoring gaming content by putting ESRB ratings such as this on game packaging

In the 1990s, as games started commonly depicting graphic violence or sexual themes, U.S. lawmakers became concerned about the industry's effect on children, then gaming's largest demographic. Gaming had already earned a reputation in America as a "ravager of young minds", which influenced Yamauchi to have Nintendo donate $3 million to the Massachusetts Institute of Technology in 1990, to "help it create games that think", as the Associated Press wrote. Soon after Mortal Kombat, some in Congress began calling to censor games like it, or as Senator Joe Lieberman said, "ban them constitutionally". This led to the 1993—1994 U.S. Senate hearings on video games. Hoping for games' content to be free from government oversight, Nintendo and Sega participated in the gaming industry's creation of the Entertainment Software Rating Board (ESRB), a private organization which creates age and content ratings for display on game packages in North America, and which lobbied Congress to only hold game publishers accountable for working with the ESRB—rather than passing censorious legislation. Games like Mortal Kombat were given the "M" or "Mature" rating on their packaging, signifying to retail workers that they should only be sold to those aged 18 or above. Nintendo then relaxed some of their censorship rules.

=== Collaborations with Sony and Philips ===
Around 1987, as Nintendo was developing the SNES, it partnered with Japanese technology company Sony to make the system's sound card, the team at Sony headed by engineer Ken Kutaragi. In 1988, the two companies increased their cooperation on the SNES, as they worked to make a CD-ROM disk drive peripheral for the console, that could play game disks in order for the console to play games of larger sizes and with improved graphics and sound. In 1990, Nintendo and Sony publicized this collaboration, and in 1991, the device's name was publicly revealed as the "Super NES CD-ROM".

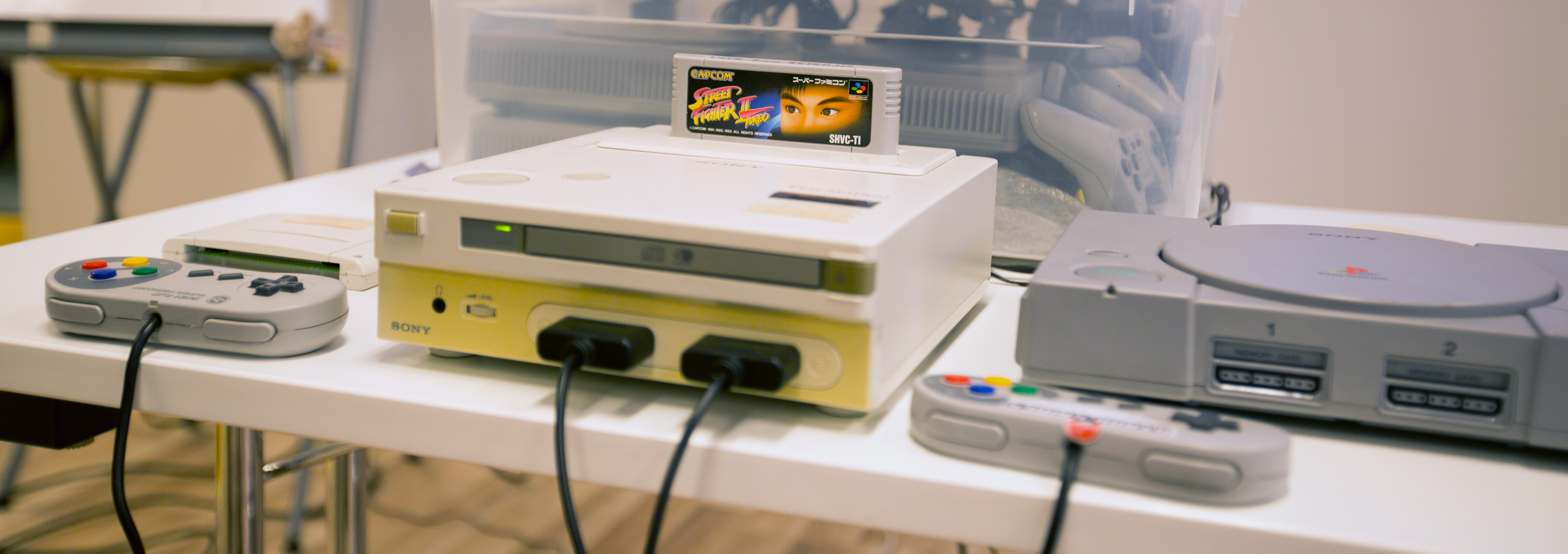
The only known prototype of Nintendo and Sony's unreleased "PlayStation" console (center), next to Sony's publicly released console of the same name (right) which resulted from the prototype

Before development finished on the SNES, Nintendo re-examined their licensing terms with Sony and found that Sony would, in their view, receive a disproportionate amount of revenue from their games which were CD-based. Nintendo attempted to renegotiate their deal with Sony, but did not get a desired outcome. One day after Sony publicly revealed their collaboration with Nintendo at the Consumer Electronics Show, Nintendo cancelled their deal by announcing they were working on CD-based games with Dutch electronics company Philips instead, surprising Sony.

Philips Interactive Media developed four games using Nintendo properties for Philip's disc-based multimedia player, the CD-i: Link: The Faces of Evil, Zelda: The Wand of Gamelon, Hotel Mario, and Zelda's Adventure—all four were critically panned. Led by Ken Kutaragi, Sony decided to continue work on the standalone console under the name "PlayStation" which launched in 1994. It attracted developers frustrated with Nintendo's strict licensing policies, and allowed them to develop games that could display fully-3D computer graphics.

In 1995, Nintendo had new competition when Sega introduced their 32-bit Saturn, while Sony introduced the 32-bit PlayStation. Sony's fierce marketing campaigns ensued, and it started to cut into Nintendo and Sega's market share.

=== Company expansion ===
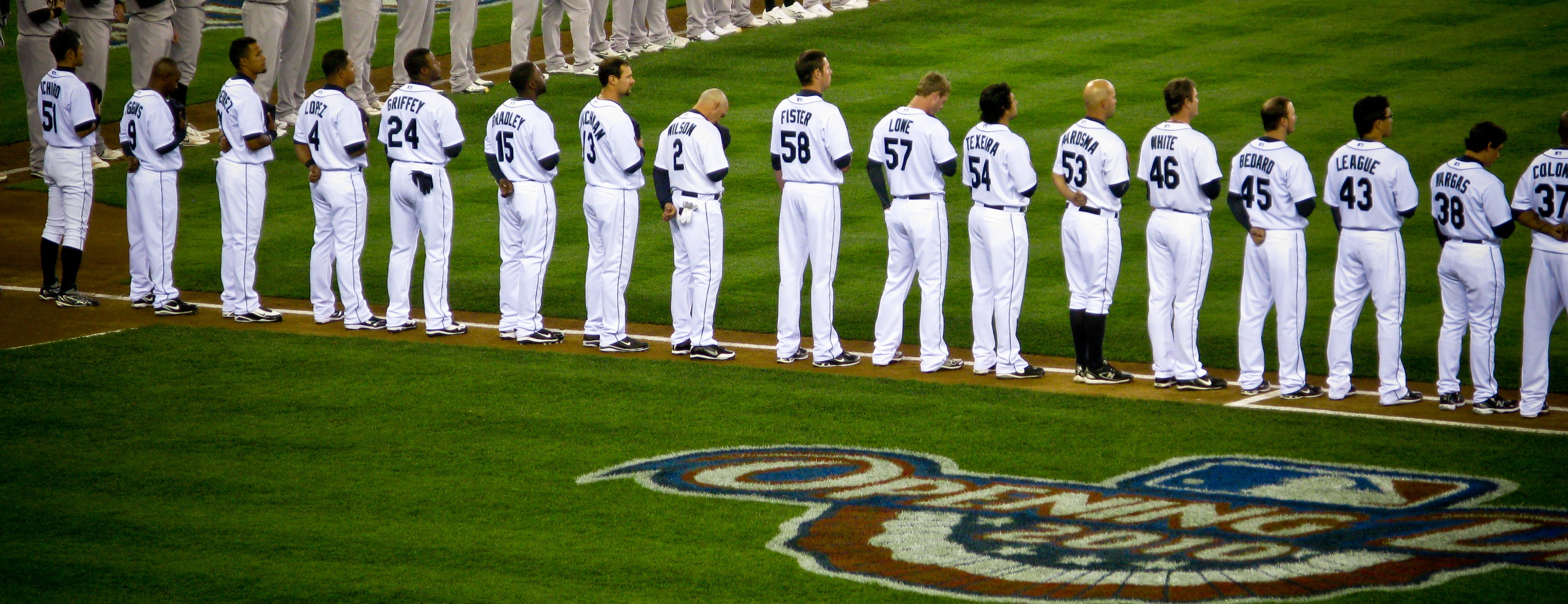
Nintendo purchased the Seattle Mariners, an American baseball team, in 1992

In 1992, at the behest of Hiroshi Yamauchi, Nintendo bought majority shares of the Seattle Mariners, a Major League Baseball team based in Seattle, Washington. The team had put themselves up for sale in 1991, as large amounts of debt put them on the verge of shutting down. Both a foreign organization buying an American sports team, as well as Yamuachi relinquishing control of the Mariners to its American managers, were unusual; Yamauchi said that his decision was "not being undertaken as business, but rather as a form of community service" by helping a struggling American company: "Japan has the United States to thank for its miraculous [post-World War II] growth, and Nintendo has also been allowed to do business in America. I owe a great debt to the United States, and I want to do everything in my power to pay it back. Nintendo sold their majority share of the team in 2016, retaining only 10% ownership.

HAL Laboratory, a Japanese game development studio, has had a strong business relationship with Nintendo since 1984, releasing games for Nintendo consoles from that point on. In 1993, HAL was on the verge of bankruptcy; at Yamauchi's behest, Nintendo bought them and made them a second-party developer of games for Nintendo systems, on the condition that HAL employee Satoru Iwata become the studio's head. Iwata was a game designer and programmer who had been with the studio since 1980, shortly after its founding. He had designed the Famicom games Balloon Fight and Adventures of Lolo. After Iwata became the studio's head, he played a major role in developing or publishing their games EarthBound, Pokémon Gold and Silver, and Super Smash Bros., among others.

In 1994, after many years of Nintendo's products being distributed in Australia by Mattel since the NES in 1985, Nintendo opened its Australian headquarters and its first managing directors were Graham Kerry, who moved along from Mattel Australia as managing director and Susumu Tanaka of Nintendo UK Ltd.

In 1995, Nintendo purchased part of Rare.

=== Project Reality ===
In 1993, Nintendo announced plans to develop a new 64-bit console codenamed Project Reality, capable of rendering fully 3D environments and characters. In 1994, Nintendo also claimed that Project Reality would be renamed Ultra 64 in the US. The Ultra 64 moniker was unveiled in arcades on the Nintendo branded fighting game Killer Instinct and the racing game Cruis'n USA. Killer Instinct was later released on the SNES. Soon after, Nintendo realized Konami owned the rights to the "Ultra" name. Specifically, only Konami had rights to release games for the new system with names like Ultra Football or Ultra Tennis. Therefore, in 1995 Nintendo changed the final name of the system to Nintendo 64, and announced that it would be released in 1996. The system and several games were previewed, including Super Mario 64, to the media and public.

=== Virtual Boy ===
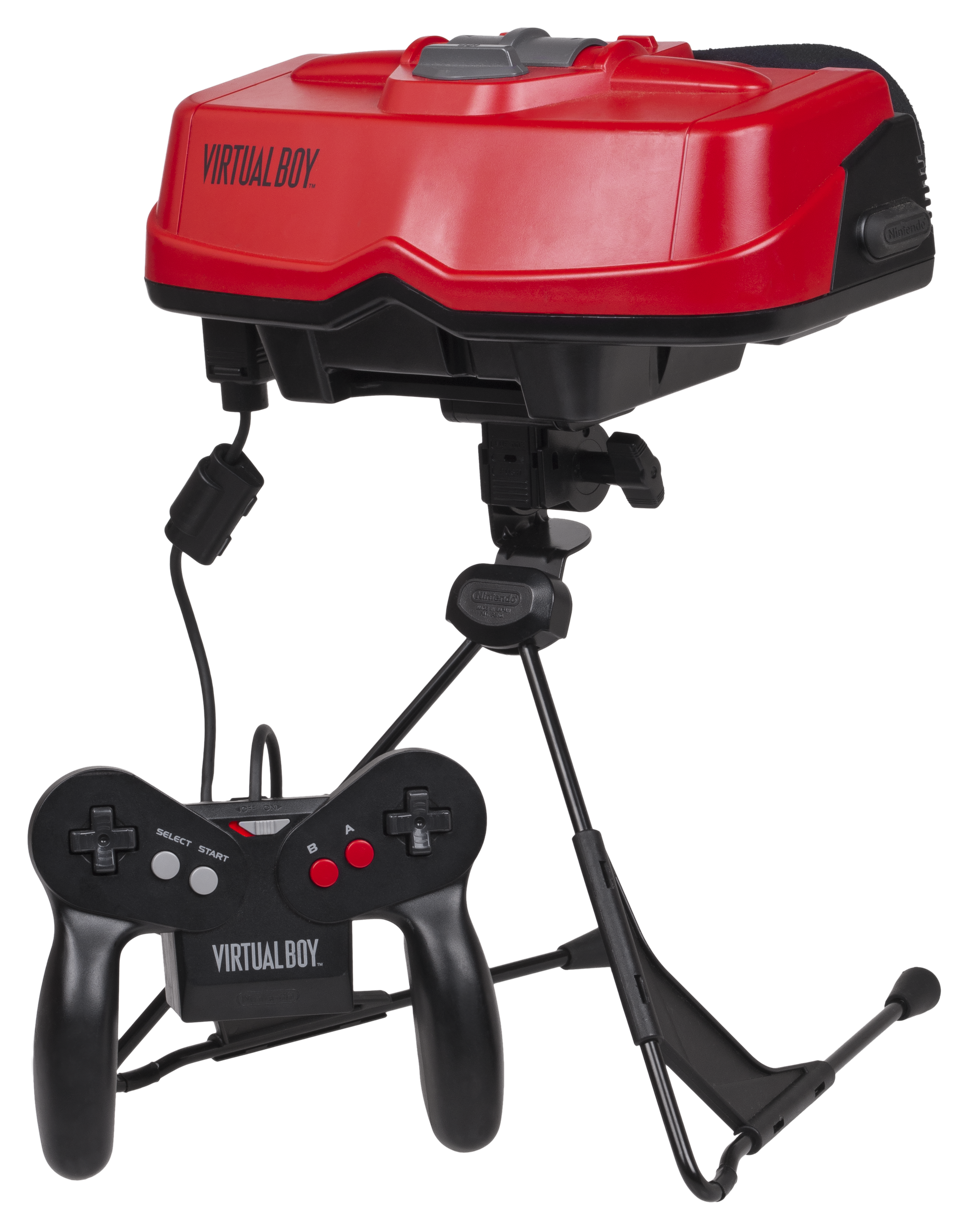
The Virtual Boy tabletop console, released in 1995, with its controller

In 1995, Nintendo launched the Virtual Boy console in Japan. Designed by Gunpei Yokoi, it was a virtual reality "tabletop console", which displays its games on a monitor located inside a headset which sits at tabletop level, and connects to a traditional controller. The monitor displays games entirely through stereoscopic 3D visuals, the 3D effect achieved via two "flat, oscillating mirrors [that] beam a different image to each eye". The monitor can only display pixels colored either black or four shades of red. The Virtual Boy remains the company's largest commercial failure. The combination of the 3D and red monochrome visuals frequently caused eye fatigue and headaches for users. Each Virtual Boy game includes the option to automatically pause the gameplay every 15 to 30 minutes, and were each packaged with multiple warnings noting that long periods of play could cause headaches, and in rare cases, seizures. The console's various games were seen as disappointing, and only 22 titles were ever released for it. Nintendo discontinued the system in Japan later that year, and afterwards, continued selling it in North America for only a few more months.

== 1996–2001: Nintendo 64 and Game Boy Color ==
=== Pokémon franchise ===
Game Freak started in Japan in 1982 as a gaming magazine. In 1989, its co-founder, Satoshi Tajiri, turned the publication into a game development studio and made multiple games for Nintendo and Sega consoles, including Yoshi, Mario & Wario, and Pulseman. Around 1990, Tajiri came up with the idea for Pocket Monsters, a game about collecting animals and having them fight other animals. It was inspired by his childhood memories of exploring forests and catching bugs and tadpoles inside of them. Tajiri pitched the game to Nintendo, who hesitantly greenlit the game. Led by Tajiri, Game Freak spent six years developing Pocket Monsters for the Game Boy, with Tajiri being aided by Miyamoto. In 1996, it released in Japan; two different variants of the game, Pocket Monsters Red and Pocket Monsters Green, were sold in stores containing slight differences but featuring the same core gameplay. In the West, Pocket Monsters was released under the name Pokémon, the two versions renamed Pokémon Red Version and Pokémon Blue Version, respectively.

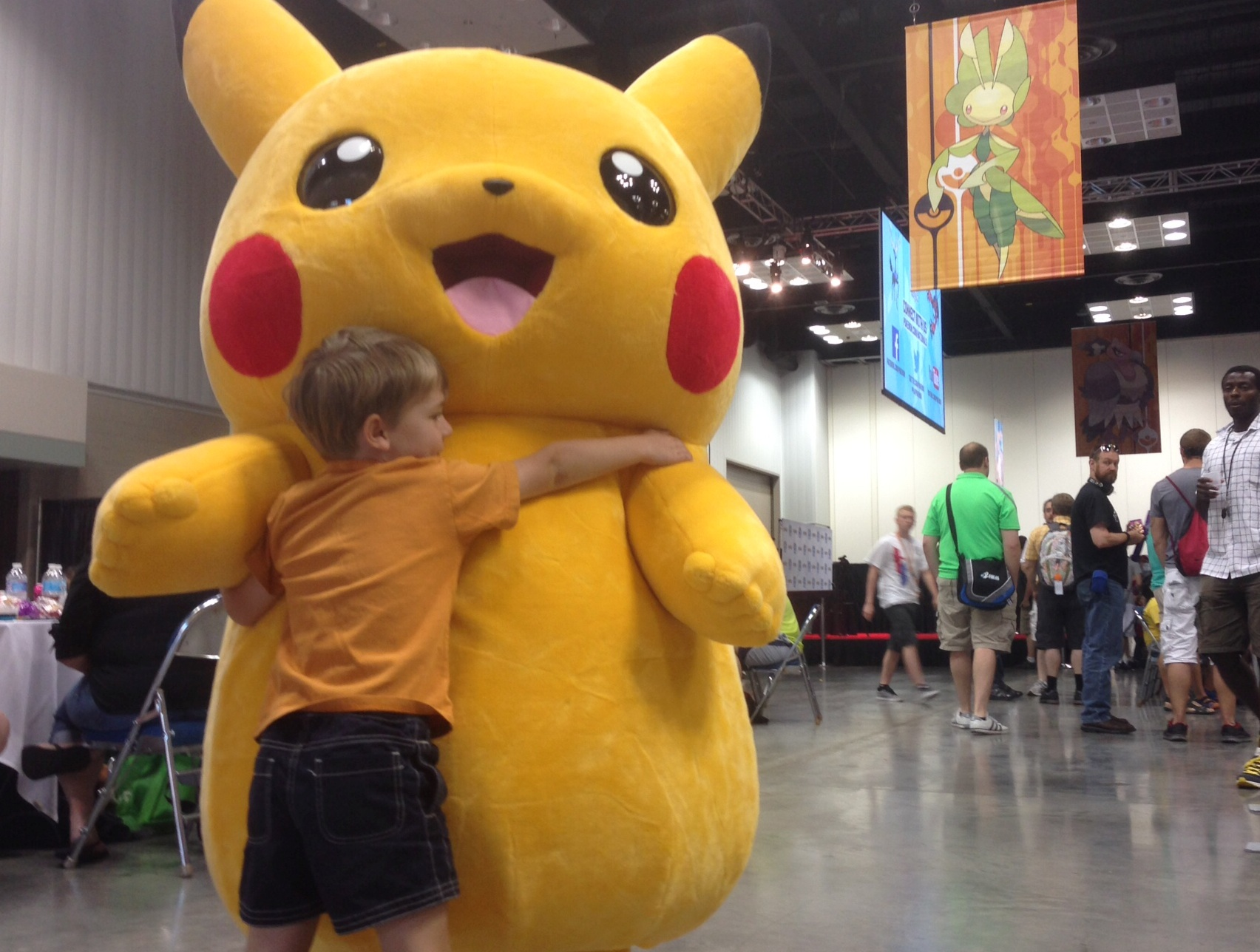
A child hugging a costumed performer dressed as Pikachu, the species of Pokémon that serves as the franchise's mascot

Pokémon Red and Blue sold millions of copies worldwide. It began a prolific series of Pokémon games, which became one part of an extensive media franchise. Red and Green were adapted into an anime TV series, which premiered in Japan in 1997 and later syndicated in other countries. In 1998, the Pokémon Center franchise of international Pokémon-themed retail stores started with the opening of Pokémon Center Tokyo, and Pokémon: The First Movie, a film based on the anime series, debuted in Japanese theaters. In 1999, the Pokémon Trading Card Game franchise was launched. In 2000, The Pokémon Center Company, the Japanese business which managed the retail franchise, rebranded as The Pokémon Company, which began managing the media franchise's branding and merchandise within Japan. In 2001, Pokémon USA, Inc. was founded as an American branch of The Pokémon Company; it eventually became The Pokémon Company International, to manage branding and merchandise everywhere but Japan.

Pokémon continues to be a worldwide cultural phenomenon, but its popularity in the 1990s was so strong as to be dubbed "Pokémania" by some writers. Time magazine described the sensation as such:

"[It] may be [hard to survive] the relentlessness of Pokemania [sic], a multimedia and interactive barrage like no other before it, with children mesmerized into cataloging a menagerie of multiplicative monsters, with trading cards linked to games linked to television shows linked to toys linked to websites linked to candy linked back to where you started--a pestilential Ponzi scheme. [...] Smelling profits, America's conglomerates have pokeyed up to cash in."

— Howard G. Chua-Eoan and Tim Larimer, "Beware of the Poke Mania" [sic], Time (November 22, 1999)

During "Pokémania" in the West, the franchise's popularity with children elicited such a widespread negative response among adults, especially parents, that anthropologist Christine Yano later wrote that such reactions constituted a moral panic. Such a negative response did not significantly exist in Japan. The Pokémon Trading Card Game provoked a particularly strong response. Pokémon cards were "almost universally banned" from American elementary schools, and schools in other countries implemented similar bans. In the U.S. and U.K., there was a noticeable trend of violence over, or thefts of, the cards, especially between children. In response to many Christians alleging Pokémon to be Satanic, the Catholic Church declared it devoid of “any harmful moral side effects".

Neither Game Freak nor The Pokémon Company are owned by Nintendo, but the latter still receives revenue from the Pokémon property; the franchise is jointly owned by Nintendo, Game Freak, and Creatures Inc., the latter being the producers of the franchise's video games. Game Freak could hypothetically develop Pokémon games for Nintendo's competitors' platforms, but do not, as a friendly gesture towards Nintendo.

=== Nintendo 64 ===
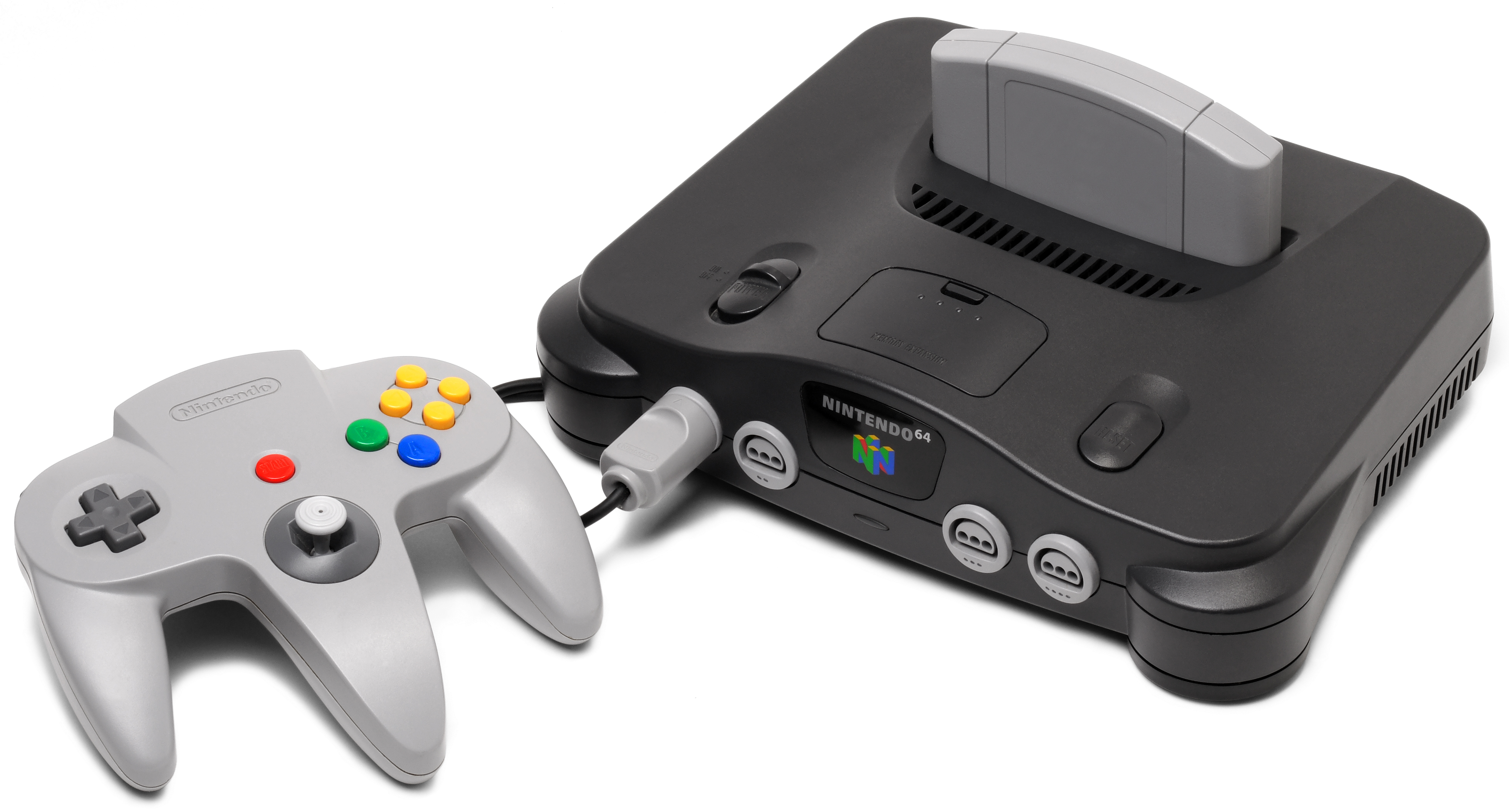
Nintendo 64 black console with blank game cartridge and grey controller

In 1996, the Nintendo 64 was released in Japan and North America, and it had a successful launch. Nintendo's extremely competitive climate was pushed by many third-party companies immediately developing and releasing many of their leading games for Nintendo's competitors. Many of those third-party companies cited cheaper development and manufacturing costs for the CD format, versus the cartridge format.

One of the launch titles for the console was Super Mario 64, a platformer developed by Nintendo EAD. It was one of the first-ever 3D platformers. It had a long development period, as Miyamoto felt that before his team at EAD started designing the game's levels, he personally needed to perfect Mario's controls in 3D space, which had a complexity never before seen in games. Since Super Mario Bros., Mario's platforming controls have adhered to properties of real-life physics: mass, momentum, and inertia—paired with an unrealistic ability of being able to move mid-air—and the player has to consider these properties before moving and jumping. Before Super Mario 64, 3D platformers did not include all of these properties, making them to difficult to play; It created the rules of 3D platforming movement that most games in the genre adhered to afterwards. It was ultimately the best-selling game for the Nintendo 64.

=== Game Boy Pocket and exit of Gunpei Yokoi ===
Nintendo followed with the release of the Game Boy Pocket, a smaller version of the original Game Boy, designed by Gunpei Yokoi as his final product for the company. A week after the release of the Game Boy Pocket, he resigned from his position at Nintendo. He then helped create the WonderSwan, a competing handheld console.

In 1997, Yokoi died in a car accident at the age of 56. He was driving on the Hokuriku Expressway in Ishikawa Prefecture, when he hit the car in front of him. Stepping out to inspect the damage on his car, he was hit by a passing vehicle, seriously injuring him and causing his death two hours later.

=== Legal issues ===
In 1997, the European Economic Community forced Nintendo to drastically rework its third-party licensing contracts, ruling that the company could no longer limit the number of games a license could release, require games to undergo prior approval, or require third-party games to be exclusively manufactured by Nintendo.

In 1998, Nintendo sued the owner of the "zelda.com" domain name, which linked to pornographic images at the time.

In 1999, Israeli-British illusionist Uri Geller sued Nintendo for £60 million over his likeness allegedly being represented in the Pokémon Alakazam. The lawsuit was dropped in 2003, and Geller sued multiple times after; in 2020, he apologized for the legal battle.

In 2000, Nintendo made an $80 million USD settlement with the Attorney General of New York, over hand injuries sustained by children while rotating the Nintendo 64 controller's joystick in five different minigames within Mario Party. The company issued game gloves to prevent future injuries.

In 2000, Nintendo announced that they had gotten Apollo Ltd., a major Hong Kong company who had produced pirated versions of Nintendo games, shut down by Hong Kong law enforcement.

=== Founding of Retro Studios ===
In 1998, as Nintendo was developing its next home console, codenamed "Dolphin" at the time, they worked with American game producer and former Acclaim Entertainment employee Jeff Spangenburg to found Retro Studios, a game development studio based in Austin, Texas. Spangenberg was fired from Acclaim earlier that year, and then secured a deal with Nintendo of America to develop for the Dolphin; Nintendo funded Retro's 40,000-square-foot studio. Within a few years, the studio had about 150 employees.

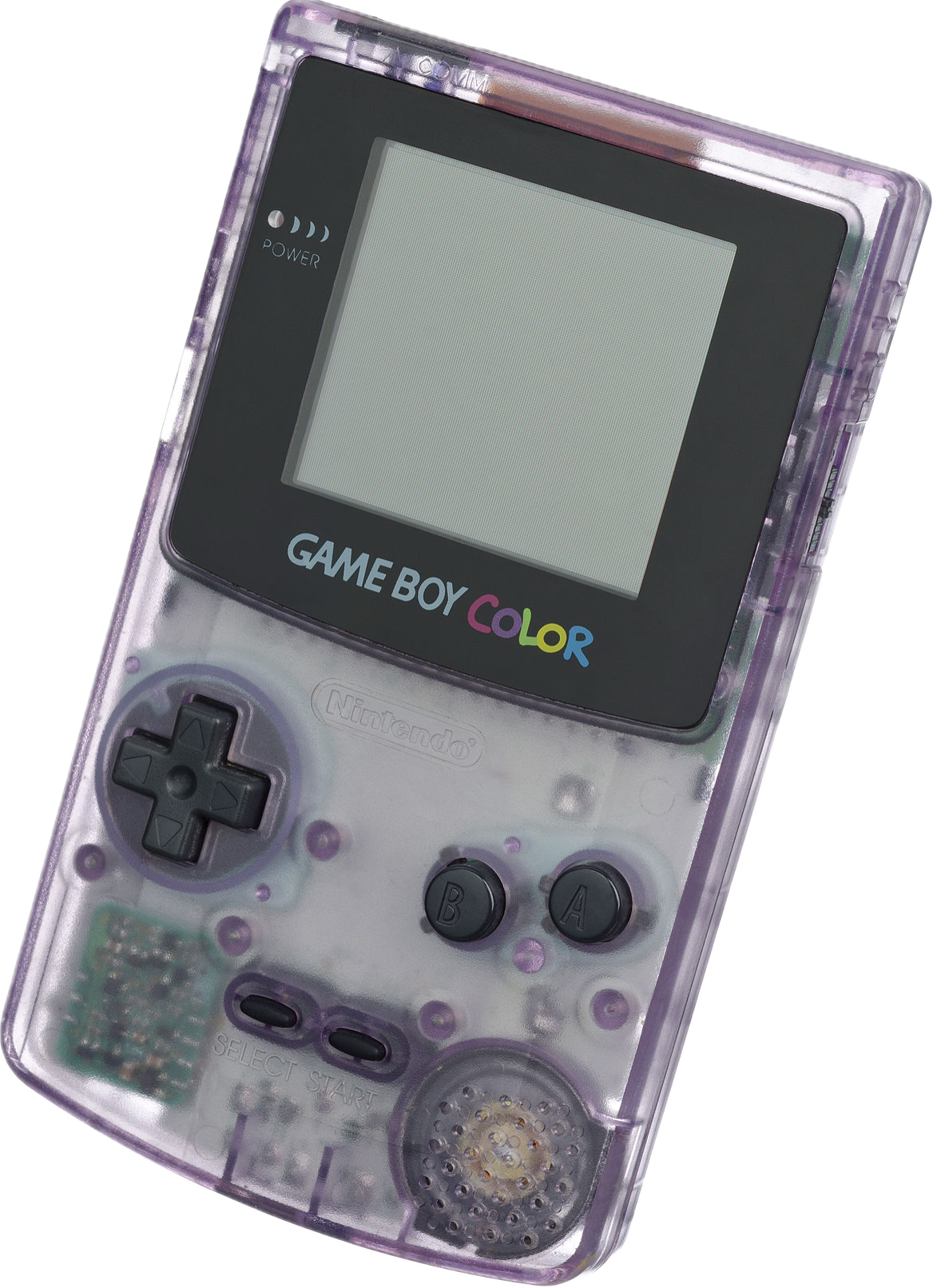
The Game Boy Color, released in 1998

=== Game Boy Color ===
In 1998, the Game Boy Color was launched in Japan, with releases in North America and Europe a month later. It was a version of the original Game Boy that could display a wide variety of colored pixels, compared to the original handheld's monochrome display. The Game Boy Color could run cartridges of games whose graphics were developed with the new system in mind, but it was also backwards compatible with games originally intended for the monochrome Game Boy; for the latter games, users could choose between four predefined palettes which automatically colored the entire display.

=== The Legend of Zelda: Ocarina of Time ===
The Legend of Zelda: Ocarina of Time, the first Zelda game to use a fully-3D graphics engine, released for the Nintendo 64 in 1998. It popularized both the "context-sensitive button" mechanic, which allows a controller's button to have multiple different uses in a game, depending on the player's location in the game world; and "camera lock-on", which lets the player temporarily force the game's camera to only rotate around one point in 3D space, to more easily understand and interact with a 3D environment. 1Up.com wrote in 2012 that these additions made the game feel "intuitive" as opposed to "the bulk of 3D action adventures in the mid-to-late [1990s, which] played like hell". Ocarina of Time was unanimously lauded by critics. Guinness World Records labels it the "most critically acclaimed video game ever", as its average review score from critics is a 99 out of 100 on Metacritic.

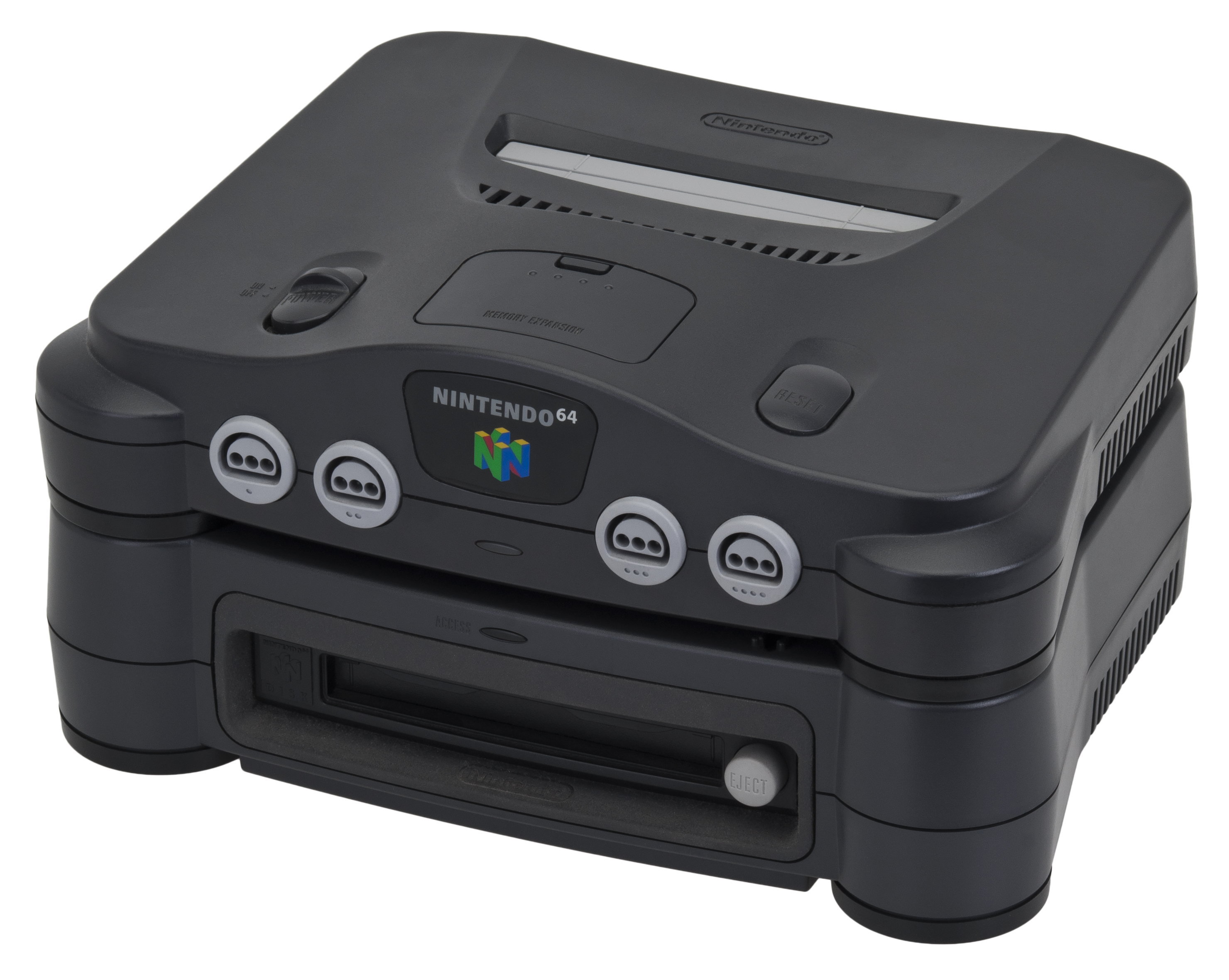
The 64DD, released in 1999, attached below a Nintendo 64 console

=== 64DD ===
In 1999, Nintendo released the 64DD, a disk drive peripheral that allowed the Nintendo 64 to play disk-based games. The company advertised the device in international gaming magazines for years prior, essentially saying it would "change the way we play games". However, the 64DD was only sold in Japan, and only seven games were made for it. The peripheral was mainly sold only through a website called Randnet, as a bundle with all seven games.

== 2001–2004: Game Boy Advance and GameCube ==
=== Game Boy Advance ===
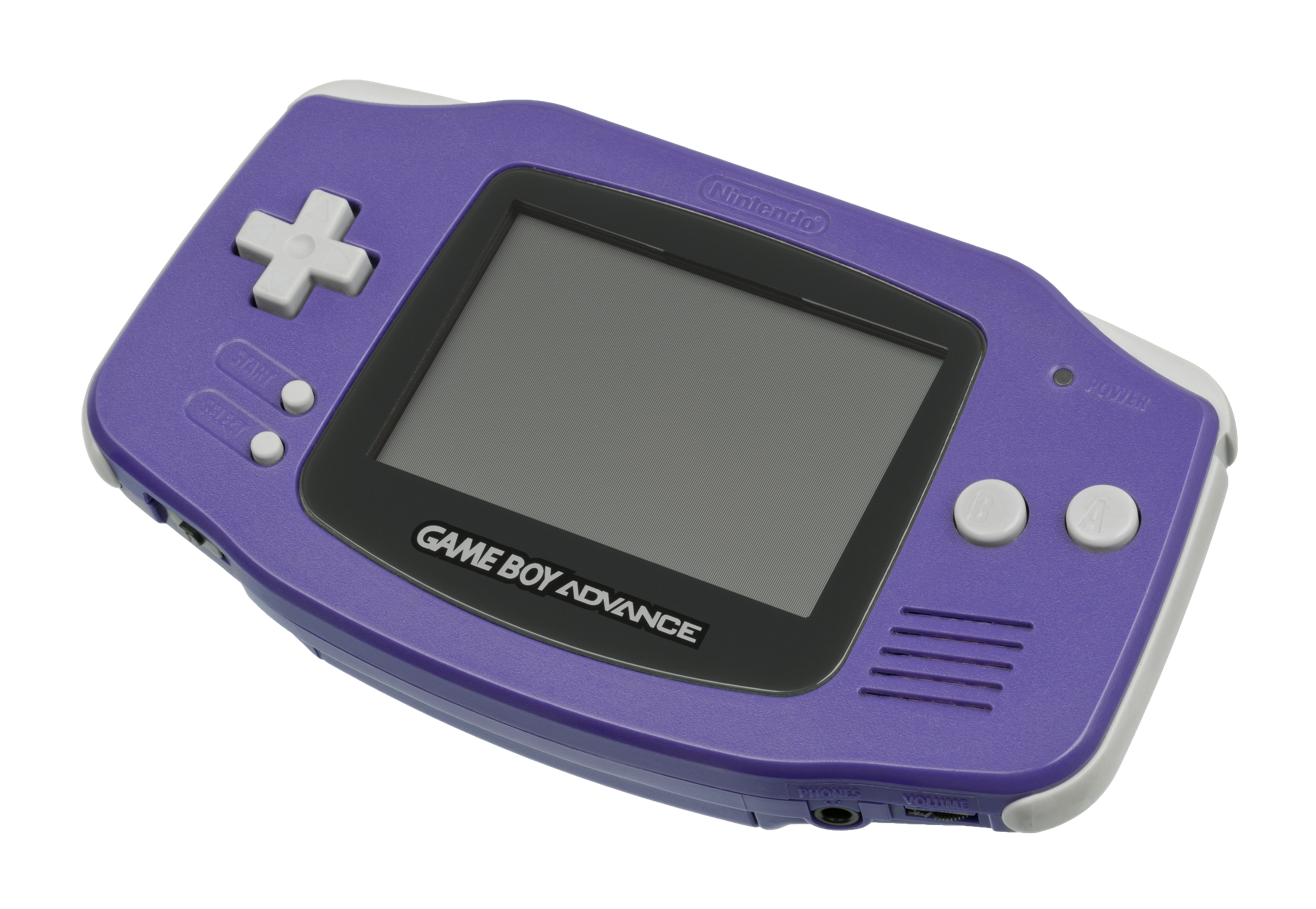
The original Game Boy Advance released in 2001, in its Indigo version

Nintendo released the Game Boy Advance (GBA) handheld console worldwide in 2001. The system had a much larger screen than previous versions of the Game Boy, and its screen could display more colors than the Game Boy Color. The GBA had backwards compatibility with Game Boy and Game Boy Color cartridges, and much like the unreleased accessory for the Dolphin, it could connect to the GameCube using a "Link Cable" and be used as a second display for compatible GameCube games. In North America, the GBA was highly successful at launch, becoming Nintendo's fast-selling system at the time, with 500,000 units sold in around a month.

=== GameCube ===
In the early 2000s, Sega stopped making game consoles after the financial failure of their Dreamcast home console. Becoming solely a game developer and publisher, Sega began releasing their developers' games on Nintendo consoles. Sony became Nintendo's main rival in the console field, but both companies now competed against American technology company Microsoft, who released the Xbox home console in 2001.

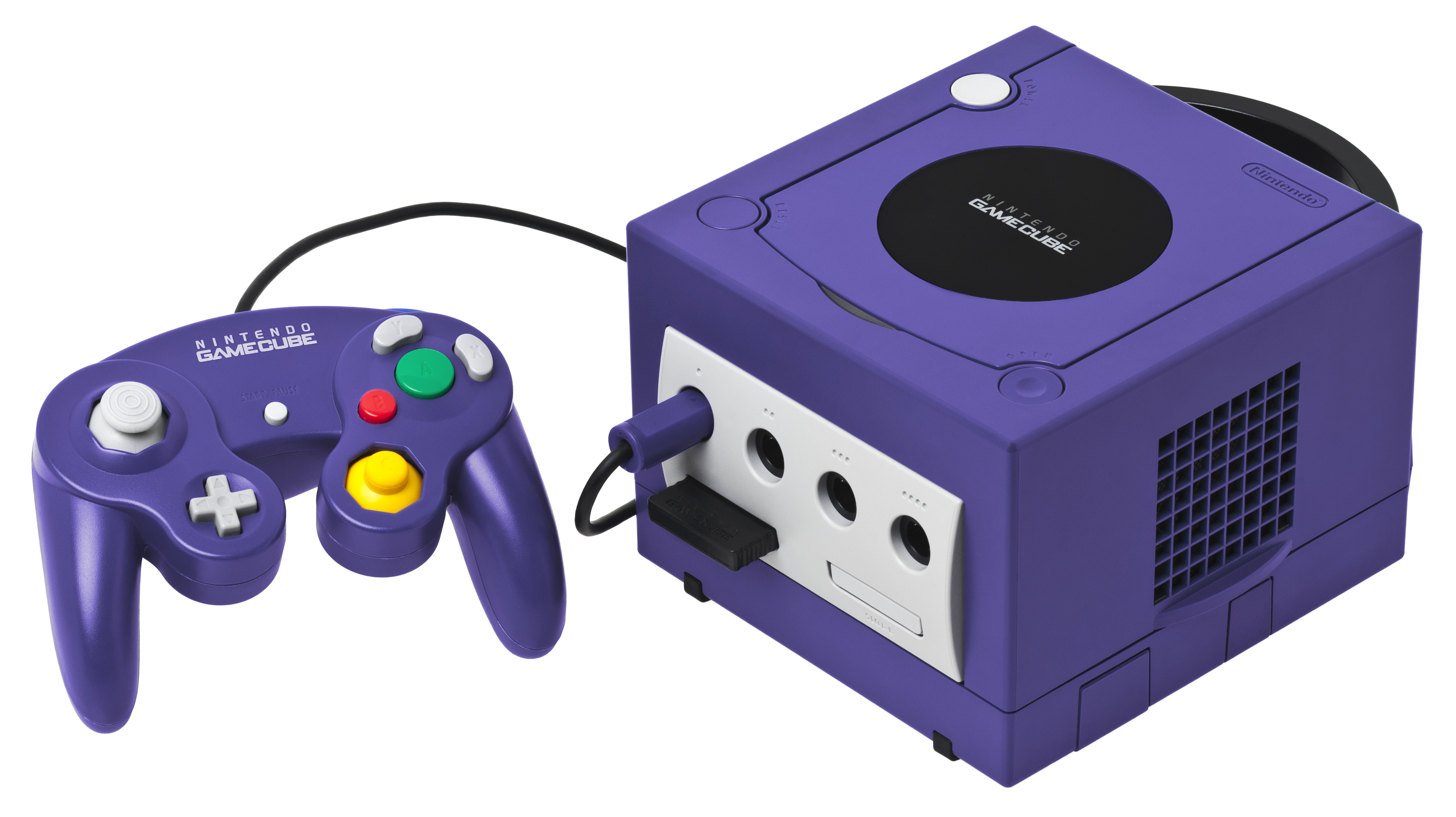
The GameCube, released in 2001, with its controller and a memory card

The Dolphin was officially announced as Nintendo's next home console at E3 1999. At Nintendo's "SpaceWorld 2000" trade show the next year, more details were given, and the console was revealed to be named the "GameCube". The GameCube had a more ergonomic controller than previous Nintendo consoles, and included a handle for easy carriage. Its games were released in disk format, meaning the console, in theory, had enough power to attract third-party developers back to the system after the relative weakness of the Nintendo 64; however, the mini-disc format was used, as to prevent piracy and have Nintendo not pay fees to the DVD Forum consortium, who made DVD technologies such as game disks—this meant a GameCube disk can only store 1.6 gigabytes of data, which was once again underpowered compared to Nintendo's competitors.

While developing the GameCube, Nintendo built a peripheral for it which included an LCD screen, that could function as a second display for games—aside from the monitor connected to the console itself—and display stereoscopic 3D graphics, similar to the Virtual Boy. Nintendo's developers were able to run the eventual launch title Luigi's Mansion on the peripheral, but mass-producing it would have been too expensive for the company.

The GameCube was released in 2001 in Japan and North America, and 2002 in Europe. The system had a strong launch—Nintendo said it was stronger than those of the PS2 and Xbox—but sales in succeeding months were lower than expected. This was partially due to the system's small early library. The GameCube also did not have a built-in DVD player, while the PS2 did; the Panasonic Q edition of the GameCube, which does have one, only ever released in Japan.

=== Leadership changes ===
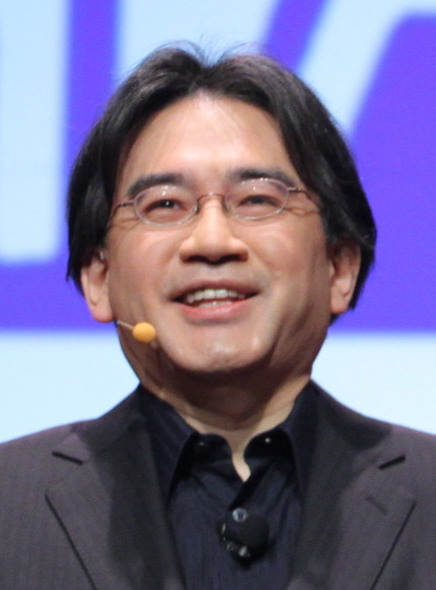
Satoru Iwata became president of Nintendo in 2002

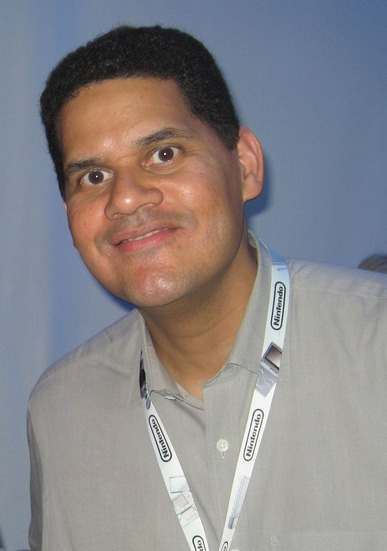
Reggie Fils-Aimé joined Nintendo of America in 2003, becoming the division's president and CEO in 2006

In 2000, Satoru Iwata resigned as the head of HAL Laboratory to lead Nintendo's corporate planning division. In 2002, Yamauchi surprised Iwata by offering him the position of Nintendo's corporate president. Iwata agreed to the appointment, and he was president later that month—the first in his position to not be from the Yamauchi family. Yamauchi remained on the company's board of directors until 2005, and with a 10% stake, he was Nintendo's largest individual shareholder until his death in 2013; that year, Forbes magazine estimated his net worth at $2.1 billion USD, making him the 13th wealthiest person in Japan.

In 2002, Minoru Arakawa resigned as president of Nintendo of America, and Nintendo named Tatsumi Kimishima as his successor. In 2003, Reggie Fils-Aimé—the future president and CEO of Nintendo of America—joined the company as the executive vice president of sales and marketing for the America division. Before that, he had been on the marketing teams of Panda Express, Pizza Hut, and Procter & Gamble, among others.

=== GameCube reception and Game Boy Advance SP ===
Despite the GameCube's technological improvements from the Nintendo 64, third parties generally still kept away from the new system. Nintendo was late in giving development kits to third-party developers in the lead-up to the system's launch. Gavin Lane writes for Nintendo Life that the GameCube was also hurt by Nintendo continuing to target a demographic of younger players, despite having an older audience of people who owned previous Nintendo consoles; Lane writes that Sony, meanwhile, "expertly co-opted anxious teenagers desperate to distance themselves from childish things" with the PS2. The cartoon-like aesthetic of the GameCube title The Legend of Zelda: Wind Waker, as well as the handle on the console, added to the perception that the GameCube was meant for children.

The GameCube did not feature any major distinguishing features from its competing consoles, except for its acclaimed, console-exclusive games like Super Smash Bros. Melee and Super Mario Sunshine. Metroid Prime, the first game from Retro Studios, saved the studio from potential collapse after they had worked on multiple unfinished game projects. Taking a risk on the studio, Nintendo had then given them the Metroid property to work with. Prime was a success, with multiple publications later labeling it one of the greatest games of all time; Retro's future was thus secured. Third-party developer Capcom, who historically have had a "rather close relationship" with Nintendo, released Resident Evil 4 as a GameCube exclusive upon its 2005 launch; it was initially one of the "Capcom Five", five games that were announced by Capcom in 2002 to be GameCube exclusives. Luke Plunkett writes for Kotaku that in 2003, the announcement was revealed to be "the result of some PR miscommunication, and not an act of corporate benevolence" towards Nintendo, when Capcom stated that the four games besides Resident Evil 4 were planned to be multi-platform. Eventually, Resident Evil 4 also released for the PS2.

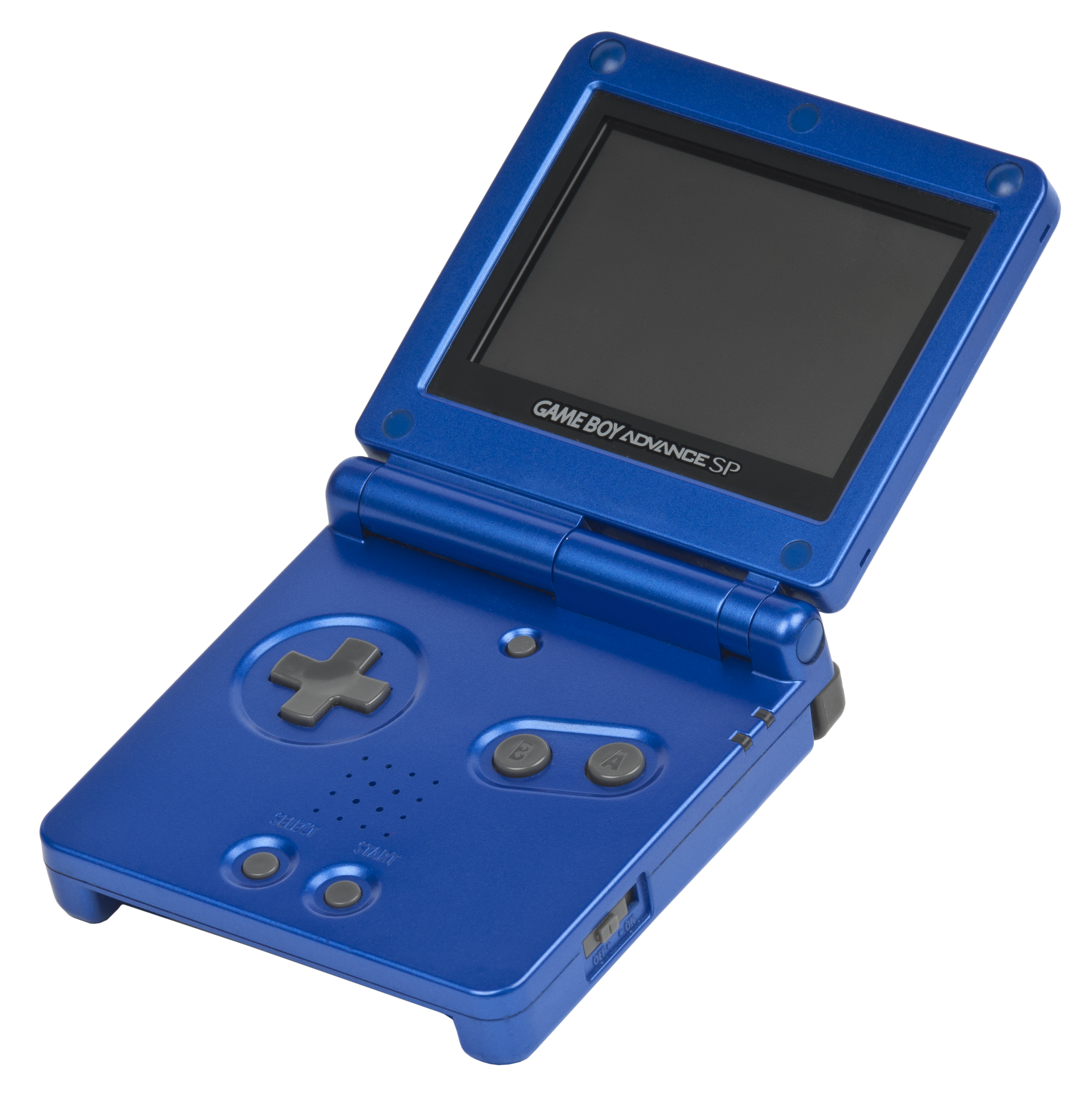
The Game Boy Advance SP, released in 2003, in Cobalt Blue

Despite the relative failure of the GameCube, Nintendo was kept financially stable in this era by its revenue from the handheld gaming market, which the company had "essentially cornered". In 2003, an updated version of the GBA, the Game Boy Advance SP, was announced. It released worldwide that year.

Nintendo temporarily halted production of the GameCube in 2003, as the company needed to sell models of the system that were filling up warehouses. Nintendo of America allocated $100 million to selling the GameCube for the 2003 holiday season, and dropped its U.S. price to $99.99—far below the Xbox and PS2, which were $179.99. Despite these efforts, the system was still Nintendo's lowest selling console worldwide by the end of its life cycle, being far outpaced by the PS2, which ultimately sold 118 million more units than the GameCube's 21 million. Nintendo stopped making first-party GameCube games in 2007.

=== Rare sale ===
In 2002, Nintendo sold its 49% stake in Rare to Microsoft, who had Rare develop games for the Xbox. At the time, an industry analyst wrote for Eurogamer that this was likely a part of a new strategy of Nintendo's to not rely on second-party development; instead, the company would better utilize its subsidiaries like HAL Laboratory, and fund third-party development using a financial "war chest" that Yamauchi had started building before his departure. Rare had also accounted for little of Nintendo's profits for 2001 and 2002. Industry commentators, as well as Rare designer Martin Hollis, later criticized the sale, either because they consider Rare's releases on the Xbox and Xbox 360 to be subpar, or they believe Nintendo removed themselves of a valuable asset.

=== European Commission fine ===
Nintendo's aggressive business tactics in Europe caught up to them later in 2002, when the European Commission determined that they had engaged in anti-competitive price-fixing business practices since at least the early 1990s. This commission laid a heavy fine against the company: €149 million, one of the largest antitrust fines applied in the history of the commission.

=== iQue ===
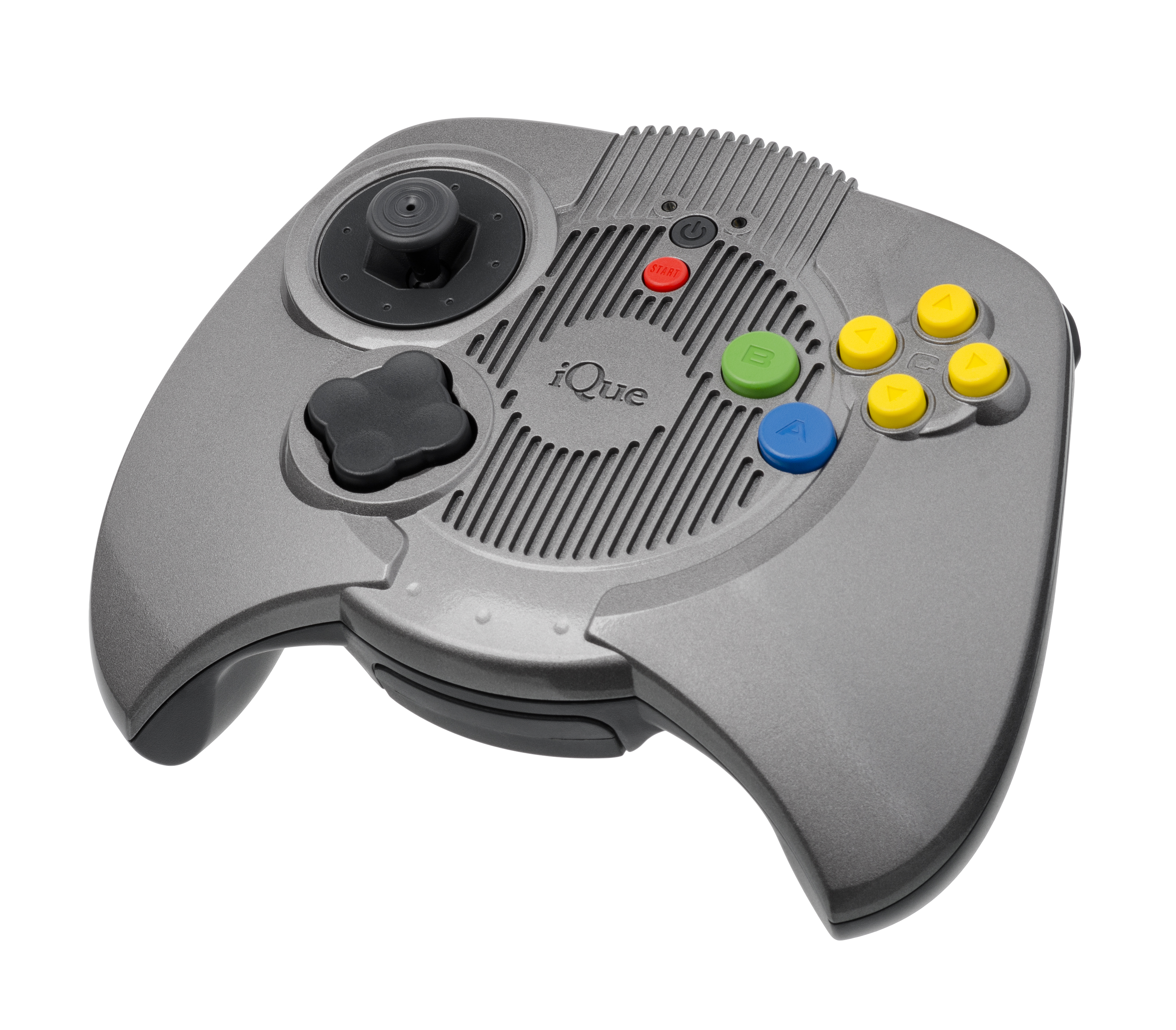
The iQue Player, both a console and a controller, released in 2003 in China

In 2002, Nintendo and Chinese-American scientist Wei Yen co-founded the company iQue, a joint venture to manufacture and distribute official Nintendo games within mainland China. The Chinese government's Ministry of Culture had banned the sale of game consoles nationally in 2000; this led the country's gaming market to be dominated by counterfeit consoles running pirated games. Wishing to combat piracy of their games, Nintendo created iQue to work with the government to legally sell games for a China-exclusive home console, the iQue Player. The system was ultimately unsuccessful, in terms of its own sales, as well as combating piracy. Only 14 games were released for the system. iQue still sells Nintendo games in China, but on regional versions of Nintendo's globally-released consoles.

=== 2004 restructuring ===
In 2004, Iwata restructured Nintendo by replacing the company's four Research & Development divisions with four new divisions, one of them being Nintendo EAD, which was kept in operation. Still led by Miyamoto, EAD was now split into eight teams (EAD 1-8) who each developed separate games. Two departments were made to work on hardware: Integrated Research & Development (IRD) for consoles, and Research & Engineering Development (RED) for handhelds. The fourth division, Software Planning & Division (SPD), developed titles with smaller scopes than the EAD teams, and supervised external first-party development (employees within Nintendo but based outside their Kyoto office). This structure existed until 2015.

== 2004–2011: Nintendo DS and Wii ==
=== "Revolution" console ===
At E3 2004, Satoru Iwata announced the GameCube's successor, codenamed "Revolution" and ultimately released as the "Wii". The Revolution started development shortly after the GameCube's launch, and was made as a "small, quiet and affordable" console, which did not prioritize graphical power. Iwata claimed graphics were not as important to the console as the gameplay of its titles, saying the latter would cause a "gaming revolution".

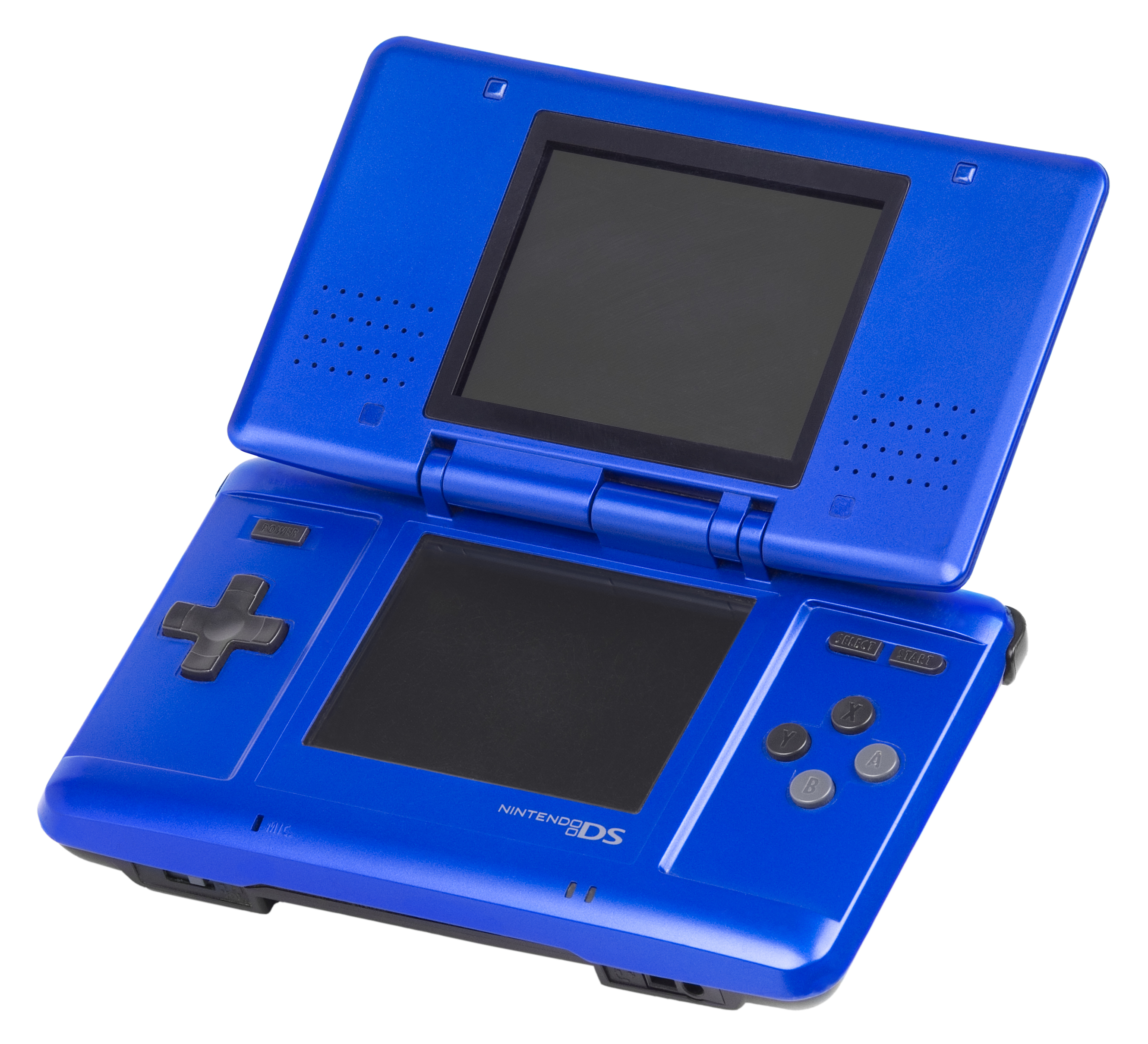
The original model of the Nintendo DS released in 2004, in blue

=== Nintendo DS ===
At E3 2004, Nintendo also revealed the Nintendo DS handheld, saying that the system displayed games on either or both of two screens, one screen above the other; the screens can be folded closed when its user is not playing. The DS was detailed to use Wi-Fi to wirelessly communicate with 15 other nearby devices, support a new 3D graphics engine, and play multiplayer modes of games they do not own through wireless connectivity, provided a nearby device is running the game. The DS launched in the U.S. and Japan in 2004, and in Europe and Australia in 2005. PictoChat, a text- and drawing-based wireless messaging app between nearby DS systems, came preinstalled on every system. Nintendo targeted the DS at a demographic of teenagers and young adults, and tried to prevent this new audience from perceiving the device as being meant for the company's traditional, younger demographic. In the U.S., it was advertised with a series of sexually suggestive TV commercials. Nintendo was overwhelmed by the number of DS pre-orders, and halted further ones before launch; a reported two million systems had been ordered, whereas the company had only prepared one million to be available at launch. By then, two factories in China had been allocated to produce the system, and Nintendo added a third to meet consumer demand. Soon, the company started competition in handheld gaming when Sony released the PlayStation Portable (PSP).

=== Nintendo World Store ===
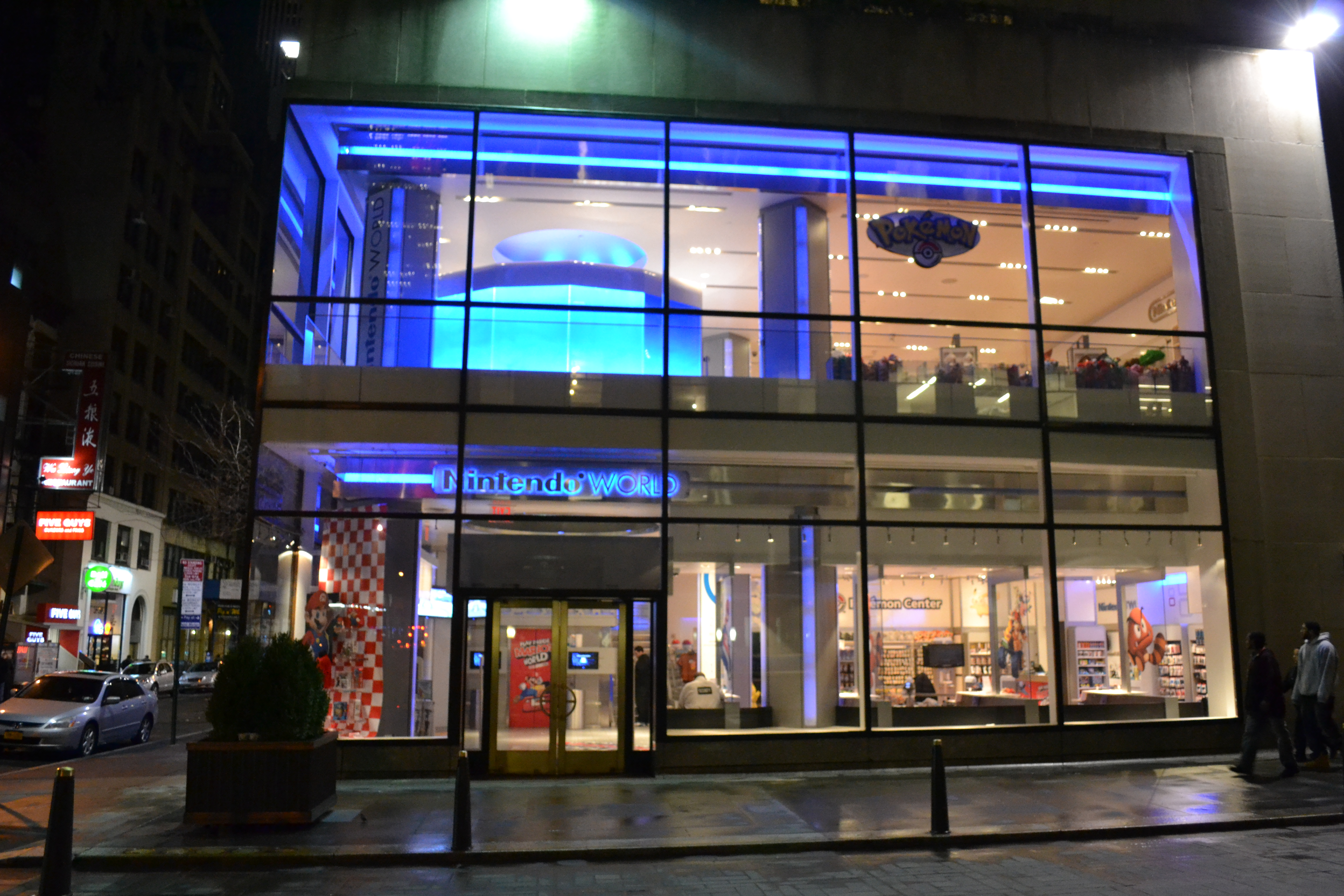
The Nintendo World Store in New York City, pictured in 2012

In 2005, Nintendo opened its first retail store accessible to the general public, Nintendo World Store, at the Rockefeller Center in New York City. It consists of two stories, and contained many kiosks of GameCube, Game Boy Advance, and Nintendo DS games. There are also display cases filled with products from Nintendo's past, including hanafuda cards.

=== Wii, Game Boy Micro, and DS Lite ===
At E3 2005, Nintendo showed the Revolution's design, though not its eventual motion-sensing controller. They said the console would launch in 2006—notably, this was after the Xbox 360 and PlayStation 3 (PS3)'s releases in 2005. The Revolution would have online gaming through Wi-Fi, and could run GameCube games. Iwata said the system would be "where the big idea can prevail over big budgets"; Neal Ronaghan later wrote for Nintendo World Report that in hindsight, this was likely referring to the system's motion-controlled games. The company said their plan with the DS and Revolution was to make games for both Nintendo's traditional audience, and a potential wider audience of casual gamers. They also revealed the Game Boy Micro: a smaller version of the GBA with a brighter screen, and a faceplate which could be easily detached and replaced with a different design. It released later that year.

In 2005, Nintendo revealed the design for the Revolution's controller, later named the Wii Remote, which was shaped like a TV remote and could be controlled alongside an attachable joystick; the latter device was later named the Wii Nunchuck. The controller can be held vertically like a TV remote, or horizontally like a traditional gaming controller. Nintendo said that they intended it to be understood by both traditional and casual gamers, and with its internal gyroscope, to be used for motion control within games. The Register's Tony Smith wrote that the controller seemed to represent Nintendo moving away from competing with Sony and Microsoft, whose consoles "are likely to be pitched heavily toward hard-core gamers."

In 2006, Nintendo announced a new version of the DS which had been in development since the handheld's launch, the Nintendo DS Lite. It was two-thirds smaller and 20% lighter than the original system, with a brighter screen. The brightness could be adjusted to one of four different levels. It released worldwide later that year.,

Do you know anyone who's never watched TV, never seen a movie, never read a book? Of course not. So let me ask you one more question. Do you know someone, maybe even in your own family, who's never played a video game? I bet you do. How can this be? If we want to consider ourselves a true mass medium, if we want to grow as an industry, this has to change.

— Reggie Fils-Aimé, presenting the Wii at E3 2006

Nintendo also announced that the Revolution would release as the "Wii". The name, like the rest of the console, was intended to appeal to casual audiences, and it initially was highly controversial among Nintendo's fans. They revealed multiple games they would publish for it that use motion controls, including Excite Truck, Wii Sports, and Super Mario Galaxy. Lucas Thomas wrote that these games' E3 demos showcased "effortless" and "crucially different" implementations of motion control, which helped assuage the gaming community's skepticism towards the "shocking and surprising" concept behind the Wii.

Later that year, Reggie Fils-Aimé was promoted to president and CEO of Nintendo of America. The former president of the division, Tatsumi Kimishima, was promoted to chairman of the board and CEO. Also in 2006, Nintendo officially established a South Korean subsidiary, Nintendo Korea, in the country's capital, Seoul, replacing Daewon Media as the official distributor of Nintendo products there.

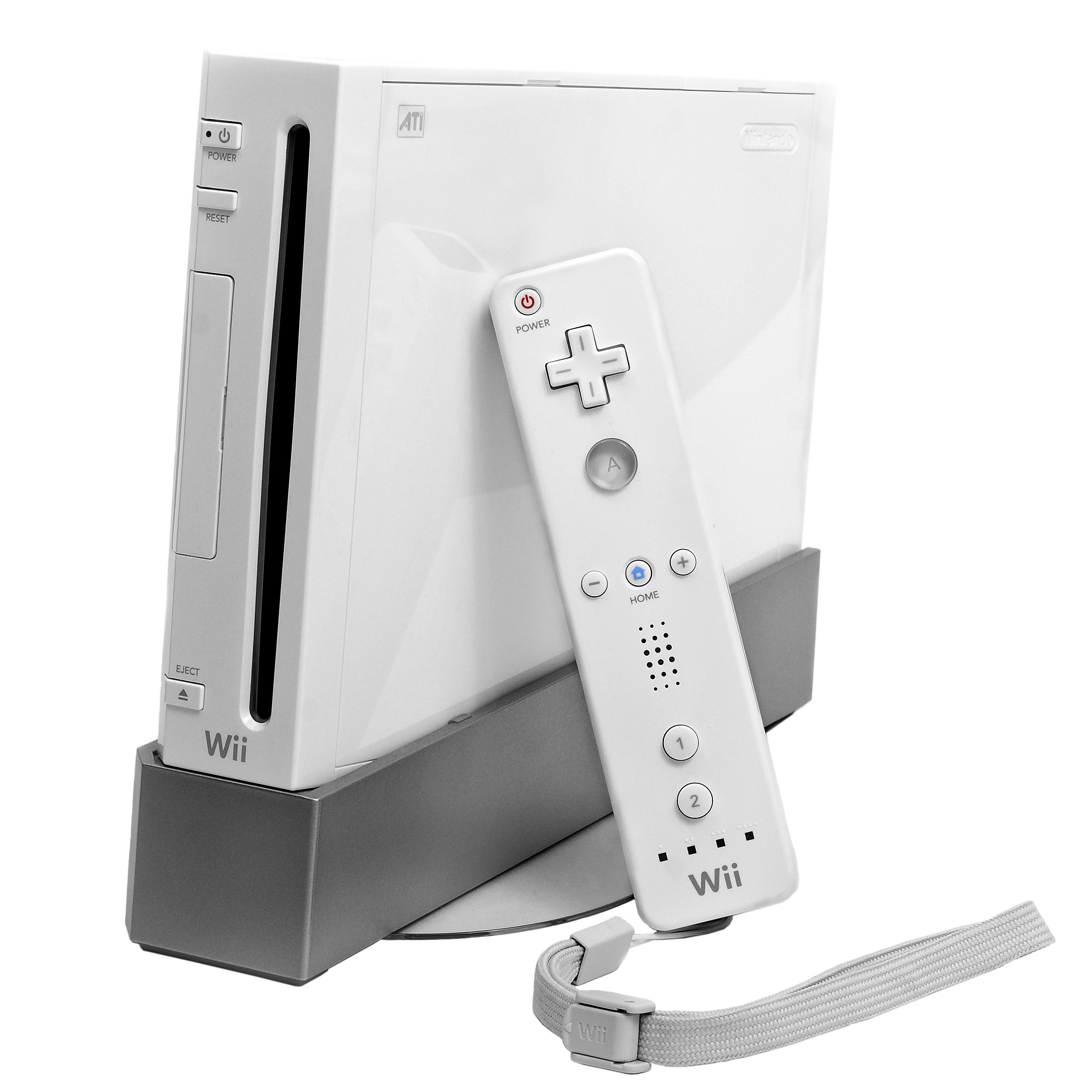
Original Wii console with Wii Remote

In 2006, it was revealed that Nintendo, along with Microsoft, was made the target of a patent-infringement lawsuit. Leveled by the Anascape Ltd., the suit claimed that Nintendo's use of analog technology in their game controllers constituted a violation of their patents. The lawsuit sought to recover damages from both corporations and possibly force them to stop selling controllers with the violating technology. Microsoft settled with Anascape, while Nintendo went to trial, initially losing and being ordered to pay $21 million USD in damages. Nintendo appealed, and in 2010, the Federal Circuit reversed the ruling. Anascape's appeal to the Supreme Court of the United States was denied.

In 2006, Nintendo announced launch details for its Wii console, and demonstrated features of the "Wii Menu" GUI. The system was released worldwide later that year. The console sold fast and was a big breakthrough for Nintendo, picking up the pace lost from the GameCube. Its unexpected success was attributed to the expanded demographic Nintendo had targeted. In response to the Wii, in 2010, Sony and Microsoft released various PS3 and Xbox 360 add-ons targeting the same wider demographic as Nintendo.

In 2007, Nintendo announced Nintendo Australia's new managing director, Rose Lappin. She was the first female head of one of Nintendo's subsidiaries.

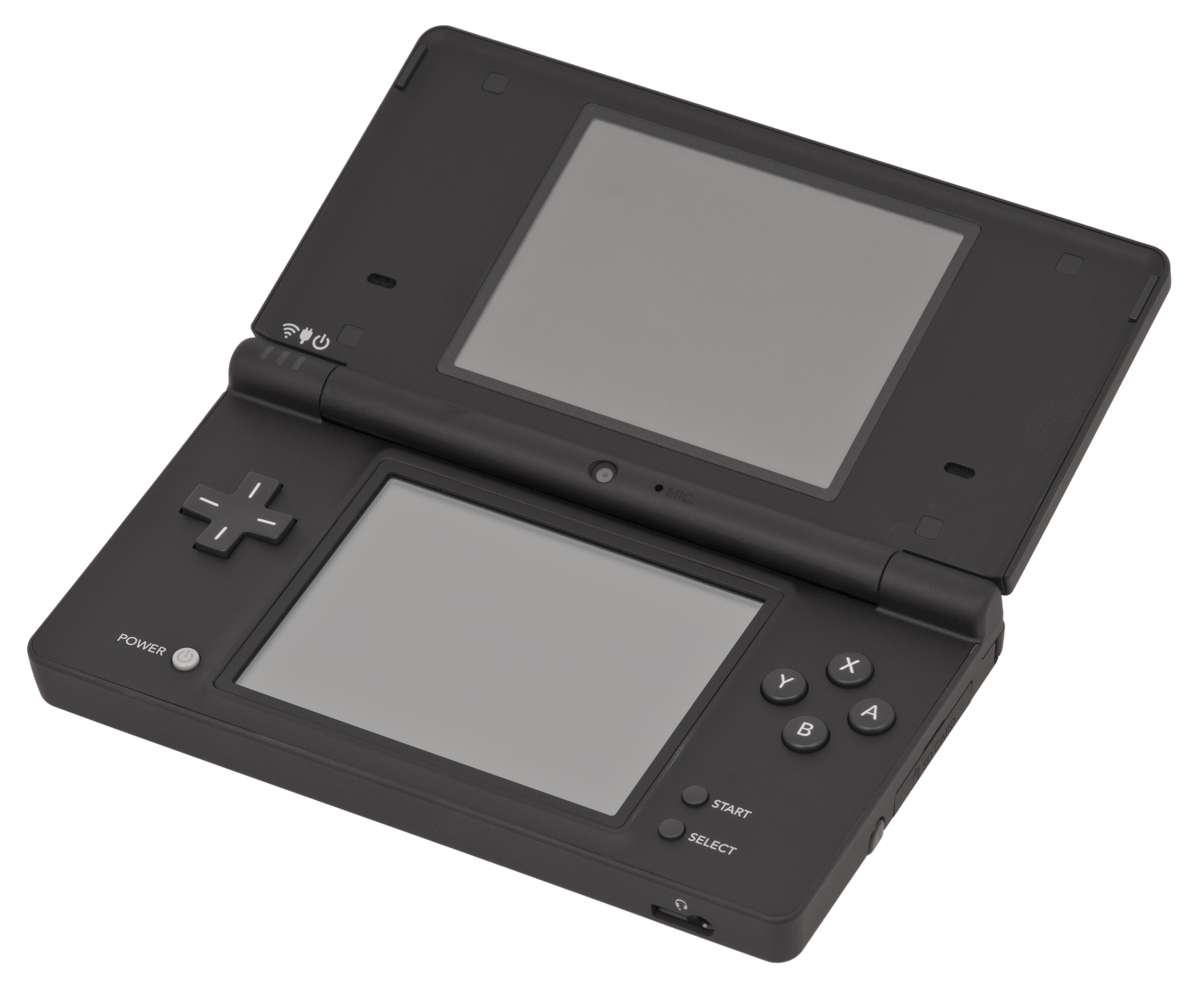
The Nintendo DSi, released in 2009, in black

=== Nintendo DSi ===
In 2008, Nintendo released an updated version of the Nintendo DS Lite in Japan; the Nintendo DSi. It includes all features of the Nintendo DS Lite, but it includes a camera on the inside and outside of the system, and newer features. It is the first handheld game system manufactured by Nintendo that allows downloadable gaming content to the system. The Nintendo DSi was released in worldwide in 2009.

== 2011–2017: Nintendo 3DS and Wii U ==
=== Nintendo 3DS ===
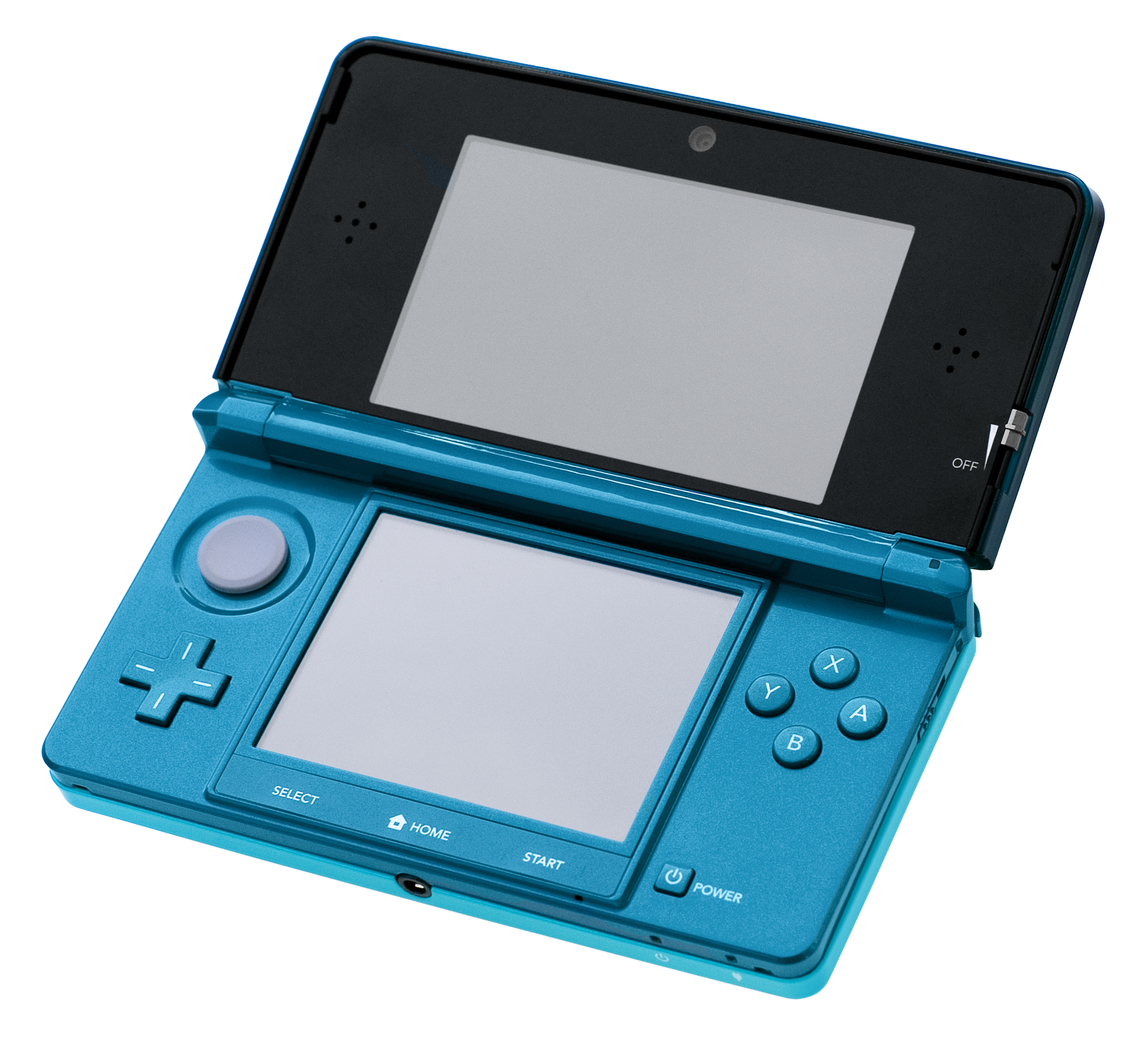
The original Nintendo 3DS, released in 2011, in aqua blue

At E3 2010, Iwata introduced the Nintendo 3DS handheld console. It retained the general dual-screen design of the DS, but was revealed to allow for autostereoscopic 3D visuals in games—a way to view 3D visuals without the use of special glasses. The depth of the 3D effect (from the player's perspective) can be adjusted through a slider; if the slider is fully off, the system will display traditional 2D visuals. The system can play 3D videos, such as certain movies that were streaming on Netflix until its 3DS service shut down. The 3DS includes gyro and motion sensors, as well as three cameras, two of them able to take photos viewable in 3D.

The console introduced StreetPass, which allows two nearby 3DS systems to exchange data when both are connected to Wi-Fi and in sleep mode (turned on when its screens are closed). This was implemented in some games as a way for two systems to essentially have online multiplayer gaming without either user's involvement. From 2011 to 2013, Nintendo operated Swapnote, an online service for sending drawings and pictures made within the app to other 3DS users; the company ended the service after an incident in Japan in which two men used Swapnote to take child pornography photos and discretely share them with each other.

The console launched worldwide in 2011. Critics praised the 3DS, saying its 3D effect was immersive and comfortable, but criticized its display resolution, battery life, and expensive U.S. price, at $249.99. 3DS sales started off slowly. In the U.S., it had a "reasonably strong launch", but in part due to its price, it sold little during its second quarter on the market; Nintendo responded by dropping the price to $169.99; this helped the 3DS rebound in the country. The device's Japanese price was also lowered.

=== Wii U ===
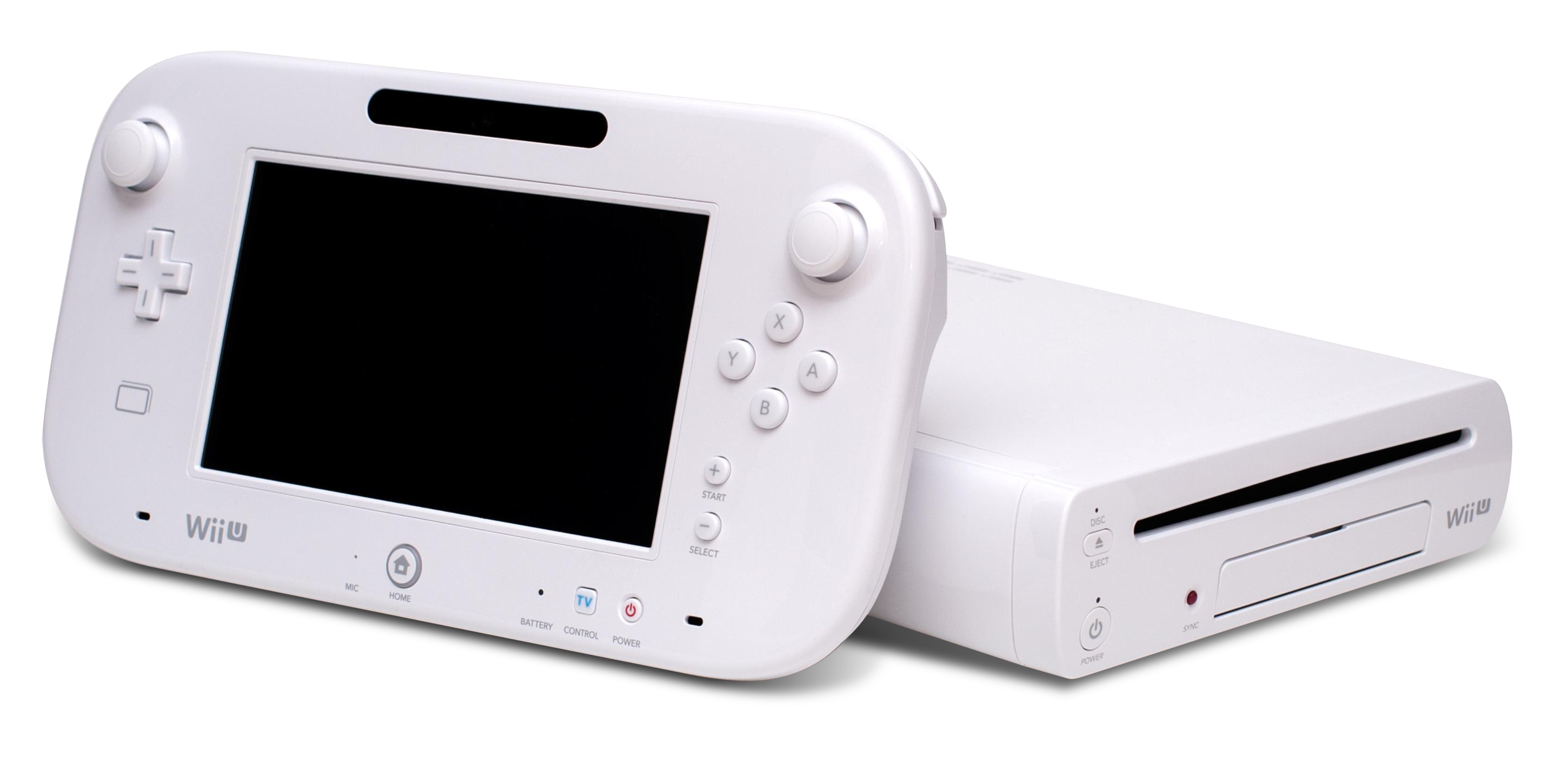
A Wii U GamePad (left) and Wii U console (right), released in 2012, in white.

In 2011, Nintendo announced a successor the Wii, codenamed "Project Cafe". More details came at E3 2011 where it was revealed as the "Wii U". Chris Zeigler wrote for The Verge: "Nintendo says [the "Wii U"] name underscores the fact that the gaming experience is all about you". The console was partially the traditional "box" with a processor that connects to a monitor such as a TV, but the Wii U's distinguishing feature was the Wii U GamePad, a touchscreen display and controller which is wirelessly connected to the "box", and includes a microphone, gyroscope, and camera. Nintendo showed the possible implementations of the GamePad's display in games, such as showing the perspective of a rifle scope in a game, magnifying details of a TV depending on which area of the TV the GamePad's gyroscope was aimed at. The company said the Wii U would output high-definition video (HD), be backwards compatible with Wii games and accessories, and support some form of video conferencing.

In the early 2010s, Nintendo's profits fell to lows not seen during their history as a gaming company. For the fiscal year ending March 31, 2012, it reported $530 million in losses on $8 billion in revenue, their first annual loss since 1981. The game industry as a whole had had weaker sales that year, but Nintendo was further hurt by a weak start for the 3DS, and declining Wii sales. Erik Kain wrote for Forbes that the posting "makes sales of the upcoming Wii U all the more crucial". Nick Wingfield wrote for The New York Times that Nintendo could be helped by developing games for mobile devices like the iPhone, which had an increasing gaming market as those devices grew more important in culture; he wrote that this was unlikely, though, as Nintendo only made software for its hardware—in 2011, Iwata said mobile gaming was incompatible with Nintendo's identity. Industry executives were reported as saying the decision "represents a missed opportunity, allowing a new generation of game brands, like Angry Birds, to emerge unchallenged on mobile devices, much as Disney did [years] ago by allowing Pixar to own computer animation."

"[Their] new console, the Wii U, may be Nintendo’s last, best hope for regaining its former glory. Executives are hoping for a holiday hit, and perhaps even another runaway success [like the Wii]. [...] But will it be the blowout that Nintendo needs? Many industry veterans and game reviewers are skeptical. They question whether the Wii U can be as successful as the original, now that many gamers have moved on to more abundant, cheaper and more convenient mobile games."

— Nick Wingfield, "Nintendo Confronts a Changed Video Game World", The New York Times (November 24, 2012)

The Wii U had high demand at its American launch in 2012; on Black Friday, it almost sold out among retailer GameStop's 3,000 U.S. locations. Sales slowed by 2013; 600,000 units had sold in Japan, and 400,000 in the U.S. The latter was 200,000 lower than the Wii in the same period after their U.S. launches. Iwata admitted that "[by] the end of the Christmas season, it wasn't as though stores in the U.S. had no Wii U left in stock, as it was when [the Wii launched]." While he stated "sales are not bad, and I feel it's selling steadily", Nintendo recognized it was not meeting sales expectations, and reduced their sales outlook for the Wii U as well as the 3DS. Wii U sales continued to slump, and Nintendo posted a second consecutive annual loss in 2013.

Analysts later claimed that consumer disinterest in the Wii U resulted from confusing marketing. Jason Schreier later wrote for Kotaku that the system was poorly marketed from its start, labeling its E3 2011 presentation "perhaps the worst hardware reveal in modern history", as Nintendo mainly referred to the GamePad as a "new controller" instead of a part of a new console, leaving many to assume the Wii U was a tablet peripheral for the Wii, rather than its successor. In 2013, Iwata said Nintendo had not "tried hard enough to have consumers understand the product." A weak 13 million units were ultimately sold by the end of Wii U manufacturing in 2017. However, the 3DS was a gradual success, having sold 75 million units by the end of its manufacturing in 2020.

=== Nintendo Direct ===
In 2011, Nintendo debuted their "Nintendo Direct" presentations: periodic online video broadcasts detailing upcoming game releases on Nintendo consoles or announcing new games or hardware. These presentations are still released as of 2026. Microsoft and Sony followed suit by making similar video series for Xbox and PlayStation news.

=== YouTube copyright claims ===
In 2013, Nintendo started copyright claiming "Let's Play" videos of their games on YouTube—claiming future advertising revenue generated by video recordings of gameplay, which had until then gone to whoever uploaded it. Claiming copyright on a YouTube video via a "Content ID Match" had been done previously—by the owners of music and film IPs to receive revenue from song uploads or movie clips on the site—but Nintendo's decision to do so for Let's Plays was controversial. Many in the gaming community argued that gameplay was, in this context, created by the person who performed it, and thus not the financial property of Nintendo. Nintendo soon removed their claims.

=== Death of Satoru Iwata ===
In 2014, Satoru Iwata was diagnosed with bile duct cancer. It was detected early, and soon, he underwent a successful operation to remove it. Afterwards, he issued a public statement through Nintendo, saying "a bile duct growth can be difficult-to-treat", but "it was detected very early" and that "I came through [the surgery] well". Within a year, the cancer reappeared. Iwata did not attend E3 2015, leading Nintendo to issue a statement that said, in part, "Mr. Iwata’s focus in this period [aside from upcoming Wii U and 3DS games] will be on other areas of our business that require his presence in Japan". Meanwhile, he did speak at Nintendo's annual shareholder meeting. Within months, his cancer worsened, and he died from it at the age of 55.

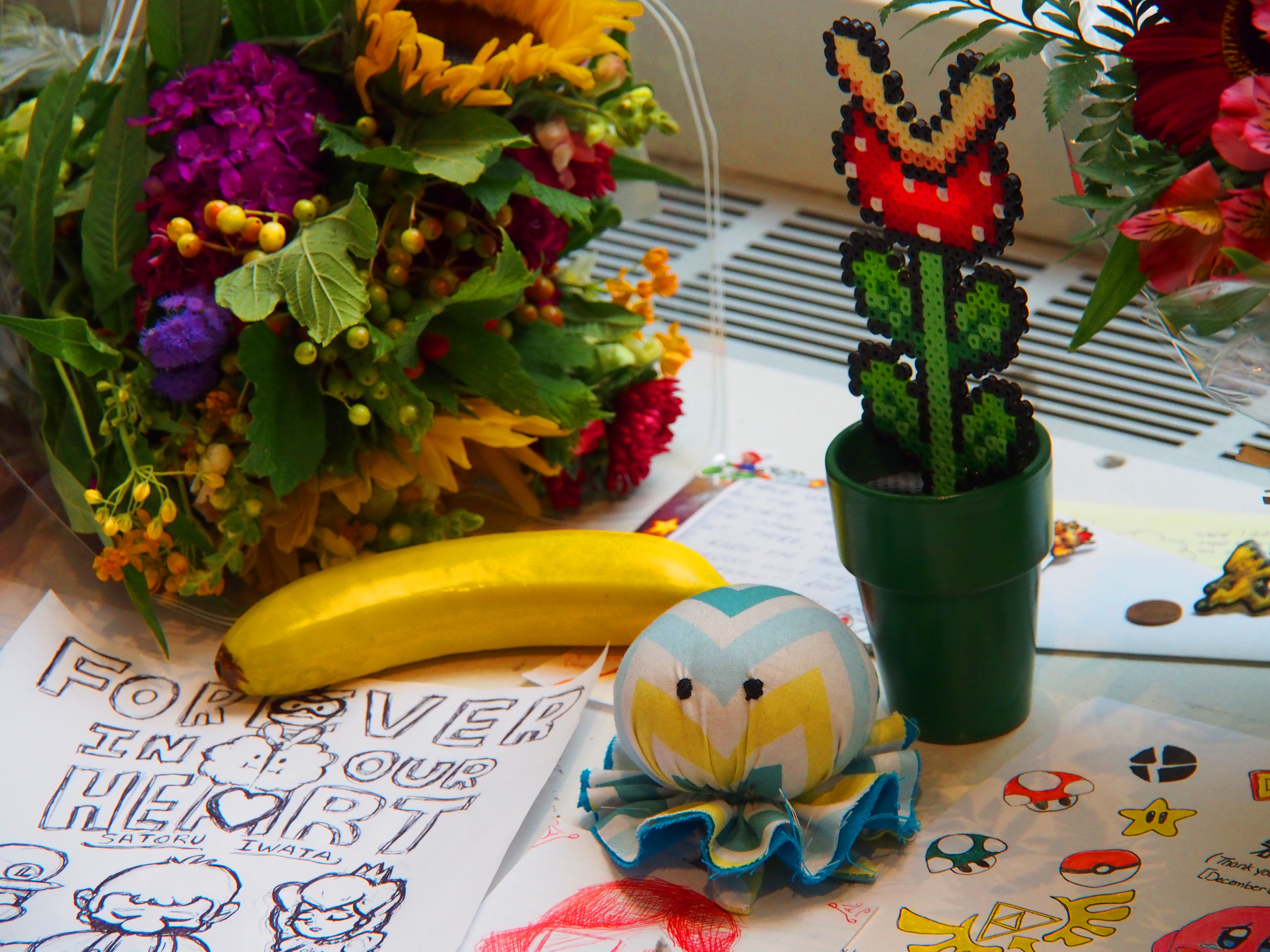
A memorial from Nintendo's fans to Satoru Iwata at the Nintendo World Store, following his death in 2015

Matt Peckham wrote for Time that Iwata was "the rarest of confluences in the business world: a corporate leader with bona fide creative experience", who presided over Nintendo's "most inventive period yet" and "[shook] industry foundations" with the Wii. Takashi Mochizuki wrote for The Wall Street Journal that Iwata left behind a "mixed legacy" at the company, as although he led the launch of the successful DS and Wii, "the company’s share price and market presence lagged behind with the rise of games on smartphones, a trend which Mr. Iwata was long reluctant to join." His death led to an "outpouring of sympathy" from Nintendo's fans, who, Peckham writes, had been "so endeared" to Iwata because of his "playful, almost mischievous and refreshingly candid personal style", which fans saw in E3 and Nintendo Direct presentations.

Later that year, Nintendo announced Tatsumi Kimishima as Iwata's successor. The decision was notable for Kimishima being one of the only people in the history of the company's upper management to come from a "purely business background" rather than a creative one.

=== Mobile games ===
Before his death, Iwata had established a partnership with mobile developer DeNA to create mobile games based on Nintendo properties.

== 2017–2025: Nintendo Switch ==
=== Nintendo Switch ===
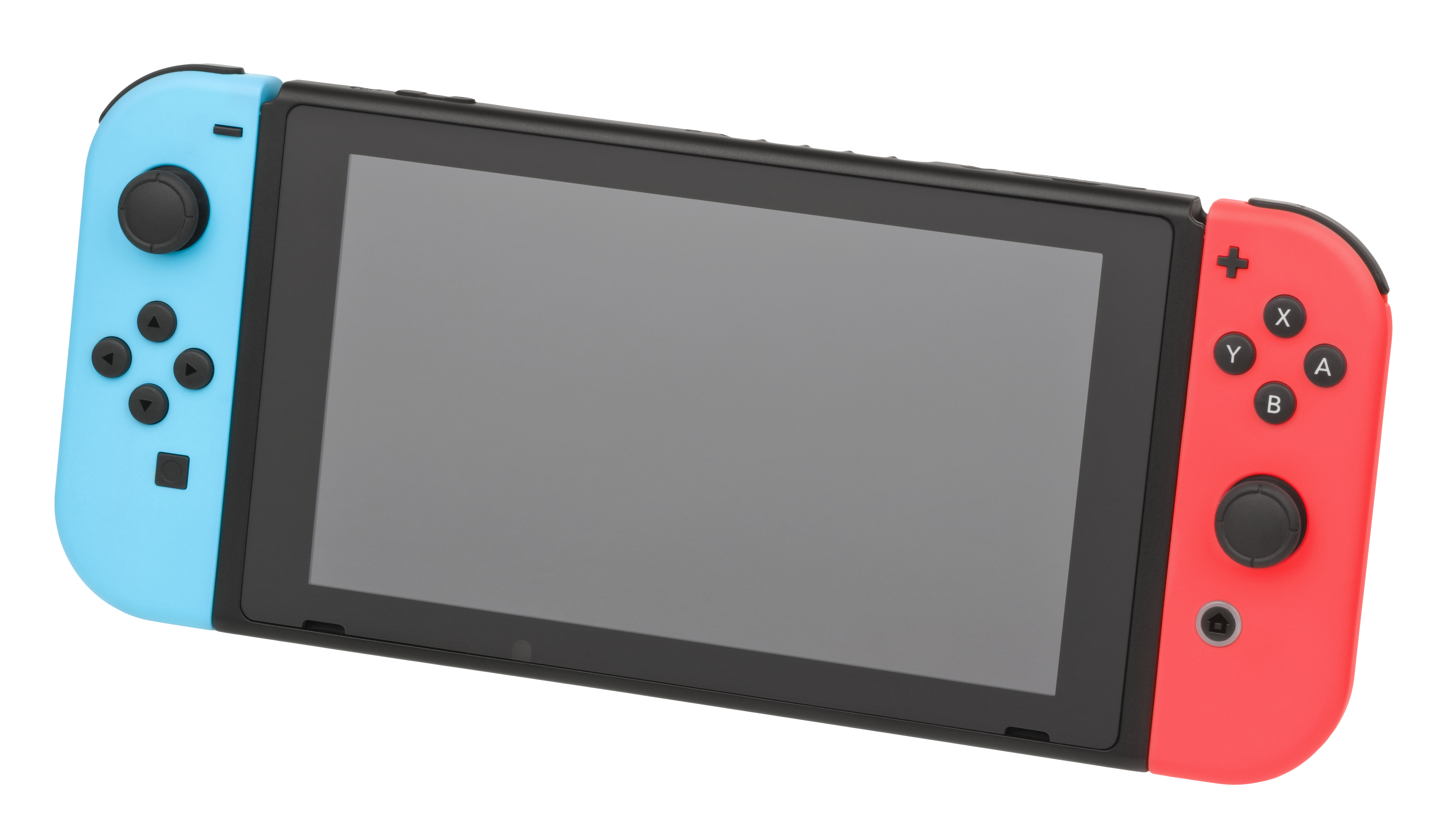
The Nintendo Switch (pictured in handheld mode), introduced in 2017, is a hybrid console that allows for both portable and home console play.

After beginning the conceptual phase of development in 2012, Nintendo announced in a 2015 press conference that they were developing a dedicated video game system, codenamed "NX". Fils-Aimé said in 2021 that the system was a "make or break" console for the company, as it became apparent that the Wii U's lifespan would be considerably shorter than average. In 2016, they revealed that the NX was set for a 2017 release. The NX was formally unveiled as the "Nintendo Switch" in 2016, a hybrid console able to switch between portable and home console play.

The Switch was released in 2017. It launched with 15 titles, five of them exclusive to the Japanese eShop. Three of them were developed by Nintendo and released worldwide: 1-2-Switch, Snipperclips, and The Legend of Zelda: Breath of the Wild. The latter released simultaneously on the Wii U, and was a massive critical success; it was later named the best video game of all time by multiple outlets.

=== Internal changes ===
In 2018, Shuntaro Furukawa succeeded Kimishima as Nintendo's president, and in 2019, Doug Bowser replaced Fils-Aimé as President and COO of Nintendo of America.

ValueAct Capital, a San Francisco-based investment firm, announced in 2020 that they had purchased US$1.1 billion worth of Nintendo stock, or a 2% stake of the company. Nintendo announced its acquisition of SRD Co., Ltd. in 2022, who had worked with Nintendo for over 40 years, primarily as a support studio.

In 2022, the Public Investment Fund of the Saudi government purchased a 5% stake in Nintendo. In 2025, the developer of Pokémon Go, Niantic, Inc., sold the game's rights to Scopely, a game developer and publisher which is owned by the Public Investment Fund.

=== Attraction openings ===
In 2020, hotel and restaurant development company Plan See Do announced their intent to refurbish the former headquarters of Marufuku Nintendo as a hotel set to open the next year, and in 2021, Nintendo announced that the Uji Ogura plant in which the company's playing cards were produced would be transformed into a museum titled the "Nintendo Gallery". In 2023, Universal Studios Hollywood in Los Angeles opened Super Nintendo World, a theme park themed around the Mario franchise. In 2025, another Super Nintendo World park opened in Universal Orlando in Florida.

=== Re-entry into film ===
In 2022, Nintendo acquired Japanese animation studio Dynamo Pictures, renaming it to Nintendo Pictures

Following the failure of the 1993 Super Mario Bros. film, Nintendo was wary of creating films based on their properties. This lasted until around 2014, when data belonging to Sony Pictures was leaked by hackers, revealing a recent email discussion about Nintendo and Sony collaborating on an animated Mario film. In 2018, Nintendo announced an animated Mario film from Illumination, The Super Mario Bros. Movie, which released in 2023. The movie received mixed reviews from critics and was a commercial success, grossing over $1.36 billion in the box office. A sequel, The Super Mario Galaxy Movie, was released in 2026. In 2021, Furukawa announced Nintendo's plans to consider animated adaptations of their properties beyond Mario. In 2022, the company acquired Japanese animation studio Dynamo Pictures and renamed them to Nintendo Pictures. Upcoming films based on Nintendo properties include a live action adaptation of the Legend of Zelda franchise under the same name.

== 2025–present: Nintendo Switch 2 ==
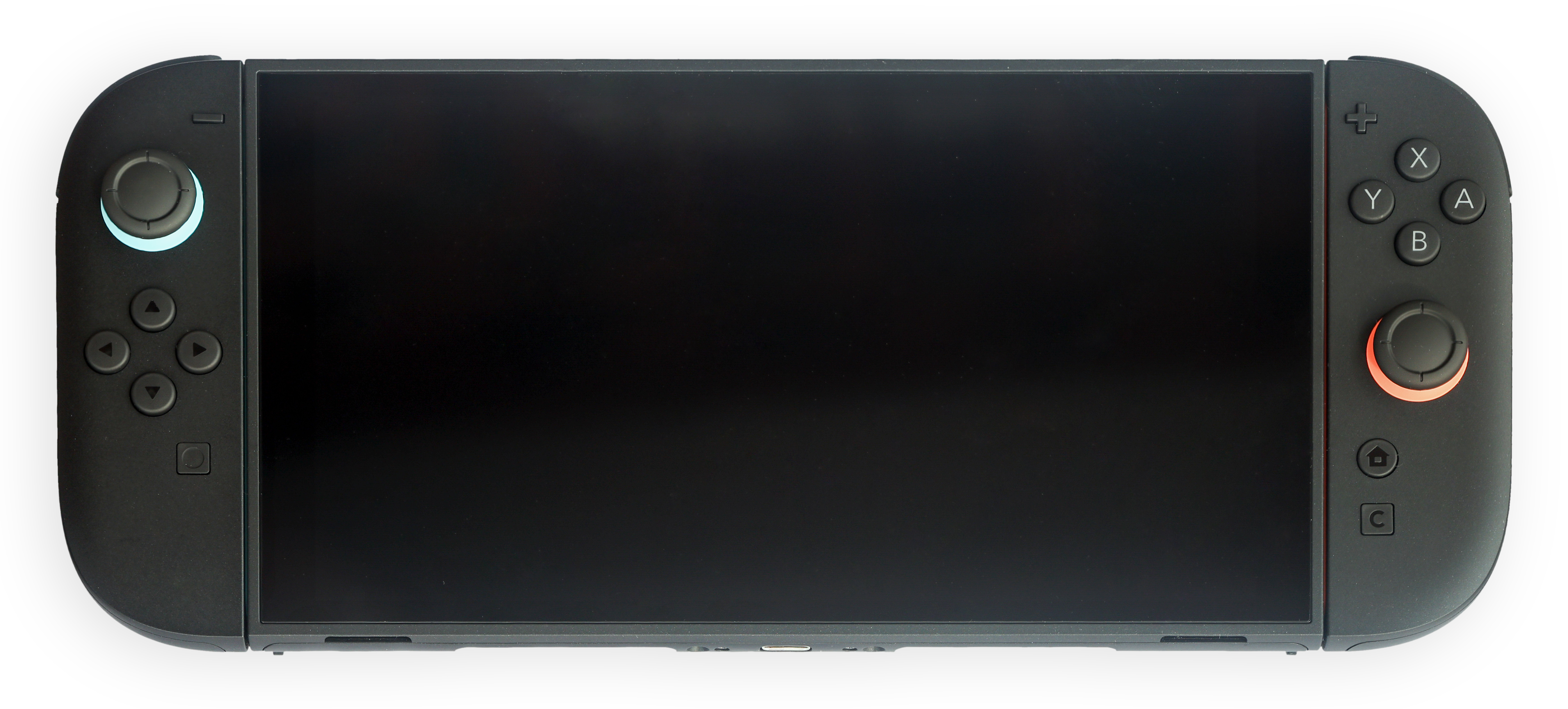
The tablet for the Nintendo Switch 2, released in 2025

Shuntaro Furukawa claimed in 2021 that the Nintendo Switch was "in the middle of its life cycle". Nintendo announced its successor, the Nintendo Switch 2, in 2025, and it released later that year. It retained the Switch's hybrid design. At $449 USD, it was Nintendo's most expensive U.S. console launch price ever. Launch title Mario Kart World was $79.99 USD, as opposed to the traditional $59.99 price for Nintendo's high-budget games. Nintendo concurrently raised the U.S. prices of the original Switch and other hardware, and stated their future high-budget games would be $69.99. Analysts theorized this was a response to economic constraints in America resulting from tariffs imposed on goods by president Donald Trump. The Switch 2 and Mario Kart World were nonetheless bestsellers, the Switch 2 being Nintendo's best-selling console within four months after launch. Outlets wrote that Nintendo's uniquely "diehard" fans "might be willing to pay more for its [products than] the gaming industry as a whole".

== Logo history ==
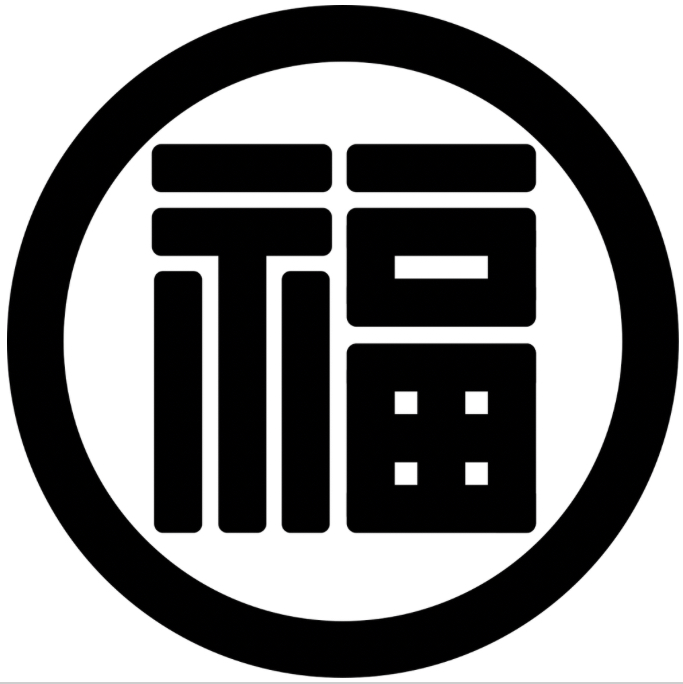
1889–1957

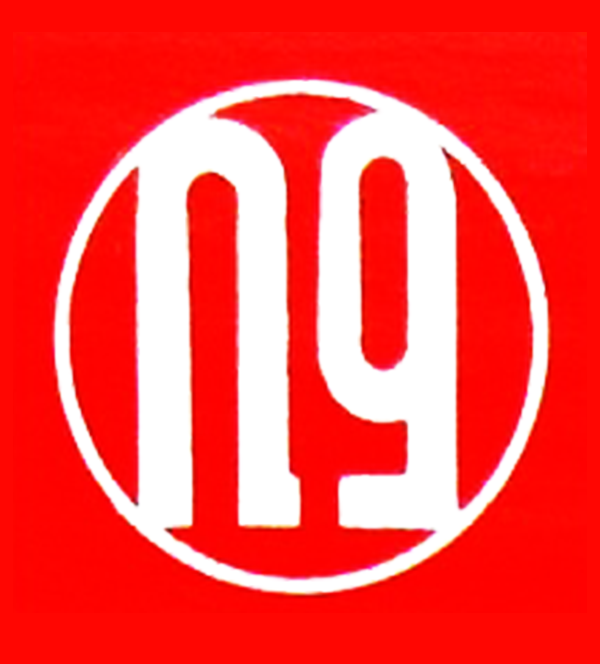
1963–1971

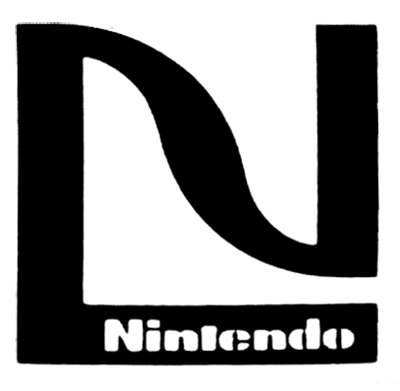
1970–1974

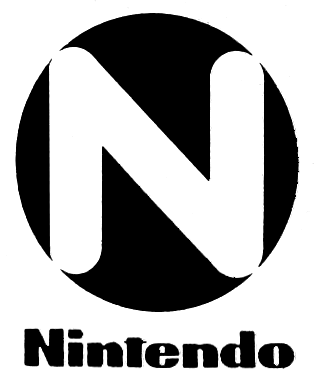
1972–1984

1984–2004 (primary); 2004–present (secondary)

2004–2016 (primary); 2016-present (secondary)

2016–present
