= Nintendo Museum =

- ニンテンドーミュージアム

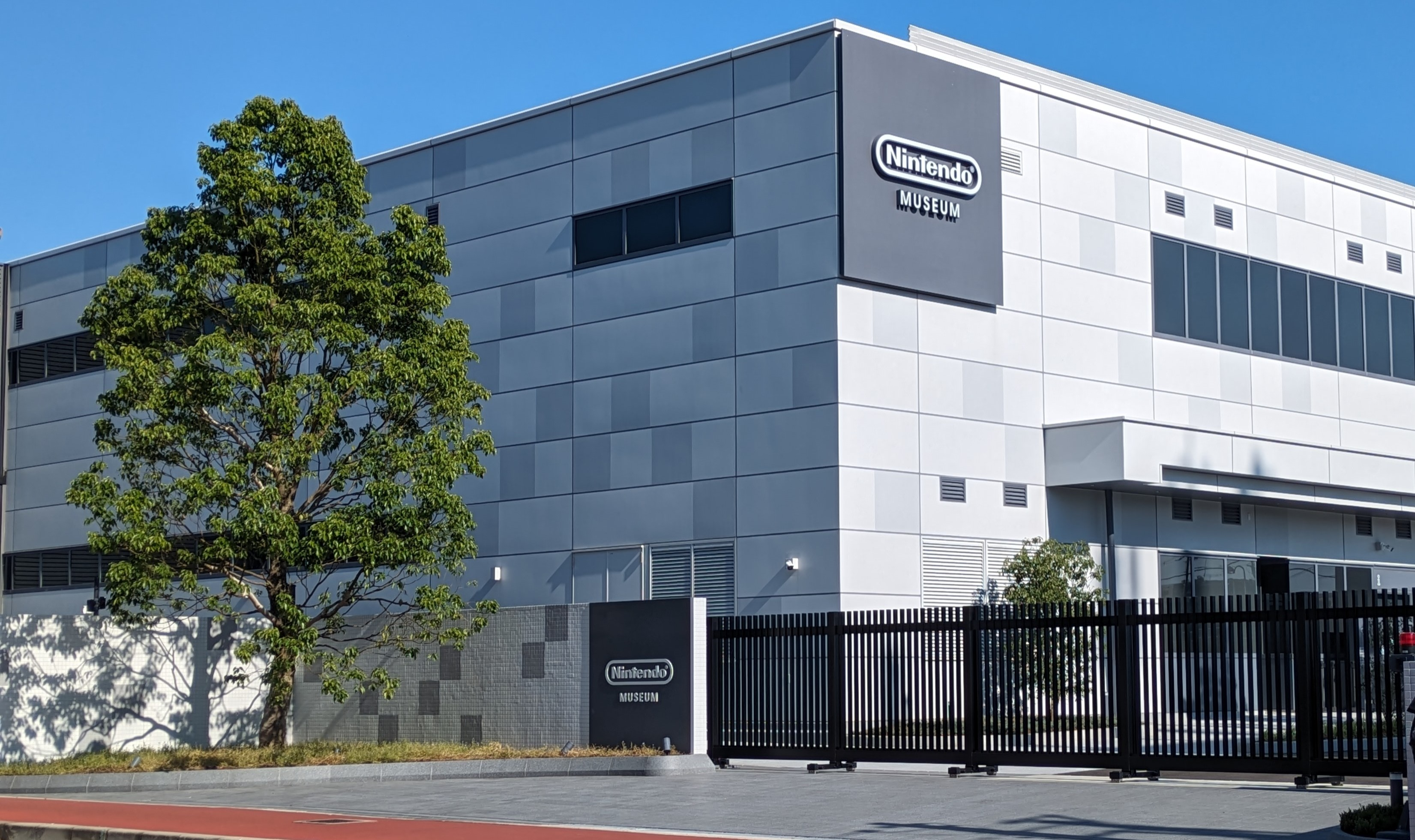
- The Nintendo Museum Entrance
- Established: October 2, 2024
- Location: Kaguraden-56 Oguracho, Uji, Kyoto Prefecture, Japan
- Coordinates: 34.892904°N 135.784188°E
- Type: Video game museum
- Owner: Nintendo
- Public transit access: Ogura Station on the Kyoto Line (Kintetsu), JR Ogura Station on the JR Nara Line
- Website: museum.nintendo.com

The Nintendo Museum is a video game museum located in Uji, Kyoto Prefecture, Japan. It is owned by the video game company Nintendo and displays a wide variety of products from across the company's history. The museum opened on October 2, 2024.

== History ==
The Nintendo Museum was first announced in 2021. It sits on the site of the old Ogura Plant, where Nintendo used to make trading cards as well as repairing toys and consoles. It features a new gallery that "showcase[s] the many products Nintendo has launched over its history" while focusing on the company's "product development history and philosophy with the public" dating back to its origins. Construction of the Nintendo Museum was completed in May 2024, and it opened five months later on October 2.

Nintendo General Manager, Shinya Takahashi, stated that the museum will feature "a wide variety of Nintendo products from the company's history". Uji Mayor, Atsuko Matsumura, said that the new museum will be "appealing to video game fans". There are currently no plans to expand the museum to other locations outside of Japan.

The museum operates on a lottery-based system. Tickets are sold through a random drawing, and visitors are able to apply for a specific date in advance. Once selected, the visitors then proceed to pay for the tickets.

== Attractions ==
Alongside the museum exhibit, which takes up the entire second floor of the building, the Nintendo Museum features a number of interactive experiences based upon various toys previously produced by the company including the Ultra Hand, Ultra Machine, Love Tester, Game & Watch and NES Zapper. Additionally, visitors can play a variety of classic video games on home consoles up until the Nintendo 64 or complete certain challenges in games using gigantic controllers which require two players to operate. The museum also offers a workshop for an additional fee, in which guests are invited to create their own set of Hanafuda cards, or learn how to play games with the cards.
