= Yamauchi =

Yamauchi or Yamanouchi (やまうち or やまのうち, lit. "inside mountains") is a Japanese surname. Either name is written in kanji as 山内 while Yamanouchi can also be written as 山ノ内.

Notable people with the surname include:

- Yamanouchi Toyoshige, 15th feudal lord of the Tosa domain
- Yamauchi Kazutoyo, first feudal lord of the Tosa domain
- Yamauchi Tokuryũ, Japanese philosopher.
- Kenji Yamanouchi, eponymous founder of Yamanouchi Pharmaceutical Co., now part of Astellas Pharma
- Akihiro Yamauchi, Japanese volleyball player
- Don Yamauchi, American chef
- Edwin M. Yamauchi, historian and biblical scholar
- Fusajiro Yamauchi, founder of Nintendo
  - Sekiryo Yamauchi (born Sekiryo Kaneda), second president of Nintendo, son-in-law of Fusajiro Yamauchi
  - Hiroshi Yamauchi, third president of Nintendo, great-grandson of Fusajiro Yamauchi
- Goiti Yamauchi, Japanese-Brazilian mixed martial artist
- Joe Yamauchi, Canadian footballer
- Kazunori Yamauchi, creator of the Gran Turismo videogame series
- Mara Yamauchi, British long-distance runner
- Masakatsu Yamanouchi (山内 政勝; born 1942), Japanese rower
- Minami Yamanouchi (山ノ内 みなみ; born 1992), Japanese long-distance runner
- Tetsu Yamauchi (1946–2025), Japanese bass guitarist for the bands Free and The Faces
- Wakako Yamauchi, American writer
- Mario Michiaki Yamanouchi (born 1955), Japanese Roman Catholic bishop

Other uses:

- Yamanouchi, Kamakura, a neighbourhood in Kanagawa Prefecture, Japan
- Yamanouchi, Nagano, a town in the Shimotakai District, Nagano Prefecture, Japan
- Yamauchi, Saga, a former town of Kishima District, Saga Prefecture, Japan
- Yamanouchi Pharmaceutical, a company acquired by Astellas Pharma

== See also ==
- Japanese name
- Special:Prefixindex/Yamauchi - the page gives articles starting with Yamauchi.
- Special:Prefixindex/Yamanouchi - the page gives articles starting with Yamanouchi.
