= Hiroshi Yamauchi =

Japanese businessman (1927–2013)

- 山内 溥

3rd President of Nintendo
- In office 25 April 1949 – 24 May 2002
- Preceded by: Sekiryo Kaneda
- Succeeded by: Satoru Iwata

Personal details
- Born: 7 November 1927 Kyoto, Japan
- Died: 19 September 2013 (aged 85) Sakyō-ku, Kyoto, Japan
- Spouse: Michiko Inaba (m. 1945; died 2012)
- Children: 3
- Education: Waseda University (no degree)
- Occupation: President and chairman of Nintendo (1949–2002)

Hiroshi Yamauchi (Japanese: 山内 溥; 7 November 1927 – 19 September 2013) was a Japanese businessman and the third president of Nintendo, serving in the role from 25 April 1949 to 24 May 2002, and principal owner of the Seattle Mariners from 1992 until his death. Before joining Nintendo, he had strong familial connections; his great-grandfather, Fusajiro Yamauchi, founded the company, and was its first president, and his grandfather, Sekiryo Kaneda, was its second president. During his tenure, Nintendo was transformed from a Japanese manufacturer of hanafuda into a global conglomerate largely focused on manufacturing video game consoles and publishing video games. On the basis of this success, and his ownership of most of Nintendo's shares, he became considerably wealthy. In 2008, he was Japan's wealthiest person, with an estimated net worth of $7.8 billion. Even in 2013, with this figure having declined to $2.1 billion, he was the 13th richest person in Japan and the 491st richest in the world.

== Early life ==
Yamauchi was born in Kyoto to Shikanojo Inaba and Kimi (née Yamauchi). When he was five, his father abandoned his family; his mother, unable to cope, gave up custody to her parents, including Sekiryo Kaneda, president of Nintendo. He was sent to a preparatory school in Kyoto at age twelve, and worked in a military factory during World War II, his plans to study law or engineering disrupted. After the end of the war, he studied law at Waseda University, and married Michiko Inaba. With the absence of Yamauchi's father, his grandparents met to arrange the marriage.

== Nintendo career ==
=== Early career ===
In 1948, while Yamauchi was at Waseda University, Kaneda suffered a stroke. As he lacked a designated successor as president of Nintendo, Yamauchi was asked to replace him immediately. Yamauchi agreed on the condition that he be the only family member at Nintendo; subsequently, his older cousin was fired. Due to his age and lack of management experience, Yamauchi was resented by most employees, and not taken seriously. This perception was challenged when he responded to a factory strike by firing long-time employees who questioned his authority. Yamauchi renamed the company Nintendo Karuta and moved elsewhere in Kyoto, in what was called a "notoriously imperialistic style" by video game journalist Steven L. Kent. He was the sole judge of potential new products, and he only approved those which appealed to him and his instincts.

In 1959, Yamauchi successfully introduced Western (plastic-backed) playing cards to Japan by negotiating a licensing deal with Walt Disney and releasing a pack of playing cards featuring Walt Disney Productions characters, accompanied by a booklet explaining different card games. That their association with gambling, technically illegal in Japan, had limited the popularity of Western-style cards did not stop the sale of 600,000 packs within a year, helping Nintendo to dominate the Japanese playing card market.

Yamauchi took Nintendo, renamed Nintendo Company Limited, public, becoming the first chairman of the board. Convinced by a visit to the small headquarters of the United States Playing Card Company, the world's biggest manufacturer of playing cards, that Nintendo would struggle to grow if it remained on this path, he took steps to diversify the company. Nintendo's ventures, including an instant rice product, and ownership of a taxi company called Daiya, failed, bringing the company to the brink of bankruptcy. Fortunes changed in 1966, with the release of the Ultra Hand, a toy based on an extendable claw which Gunpei Yokoi, a factory engineer, was seen by Yamauchi to be playing with during a break. Relying on Nintendo's pre-existing distribution networks, Yamauchi decided to move into the toy industry. Yokoi was transferred to a new department called Games and Setup, and tasked with developing more toys. Among the products which established Nintendo as a toymaker were the Love Tester, an electronic toy which allegedly determined the strength of romantic relationships, and a light gun using solar cells for targets.

=== Beginning of the electronics era ===
Many of Nintendo's toys included electronic components. Noticing the combination of technological developments and decreasing prices, and the rise of arcade games and video game consoles like the Magnavox Odyssey, Yamauchi realized that electronics could become foundational to Nintendo's products, as opposed to a novelty. Nintendo became the Japanese distributor of the Odyssey, and established Nintendo Research & Development Department, a unit dedicated to the development of video games. By the end of the 1970s, a second unit had been established, with employees hired from Sharp Electronics to develop the Color TV-Game 6, Nintendo's first console. The separation, deemed unique by researcher Steven Boyer, lead to competition, and, in turn, innovation. Games like Radar Scope, Space Fever, and Sheriff began appearing in arcades, though they achieved little popularity in America until 1981, when Donkey Kong, a passion project of Shigeru Miyamoto, was released.

=== Nintendo Entertainment System ===
In 1980, Nintendo introduced the Game & Watch, a series of portable video games designed by Yokoi, and featuring, newly for the time, an LCD and microprocessor. Though the product line was a hit, it was believed by Yamauchi that it lacked the depth to be a long-term success. Efforts to develop a product which could be one led to the release in 1983 of the Family Computer, a console commonly abbreviated as the Famicom. First-party titles were developed by Nintendo's R&D units; a third and fourth were established in 1980 and 1983, respectively. In the wake of the video game crash of 1983, which he believed was caused by a glut of poor-quality games, Yamauchi was not only strict about approving the release of games, but restricted third-party publishers to releasing just three titles a year. Still, games were made easy to develop, as he believed that artists, not technicians, create excellent games.

Yamauchi's confidence in the Famicom paid off. He promised an electronics company that one million units would be ordered within two years, a goal easily reached. Released outside Japan as the Nintendo Entertainment System, and redesigned to minimize its association with video games, the console was an equal smash; by 1990, the majority of consoles historically sold were NESes or Famicoms.

=== Super Nintendo Entertainment System ===
Midway through the Famicom's lifespan, with 16-bit consoles becoming popular, work began on a successor, the Super Famicom. It was released in Japan in 1990; outside the country, it was renamed the Super Nintendo Entertainment System, and released in North America in 1991, and Europe in 1992. Such was Nintendo's popularity, initial stocks in Japan sold out within three days, and people camped outside stores for days in the hopes of acquiring a console. Similar success was not achieved with the Virtual Boy, a 1995 attempt at a virtual reality console. At a press conference, Yamauchi stated that he still had faith in the system, and that the company would continue developing games for it.

=== Nintendo 64 ===
As the 1990s progressed, 3D gaming became increasingly viable. Nintendo primarily capitalized on this trend with the Nintendo 64, a 64-bit console released in 1996. Though praised by critics, it struggled commercially, with consumer attention devoted to the PlayStation, Sony's first console.

For much of the 1990s, age was not an obstacle for Yamauchi. In 1995, when he was 68, he was called "the most feared and respected man in the videogame industry" by Next Generation magazine, which also noted that he "[remained] very much in charge" of Nintendo. Things began to change in 1996, when he publicly mused about retiring from Nintendo, noting that he could not think of a good replacement as president. In 1997, he announced that regardless of whether a suitable successor was found, he would retire by 2000, when the 64DD, a disk drive for the Nintendo 64, was released.

=== GameCube ===
In 1999, Nintendo announced the development of the successor to the Nintendo 64, codenamed Dolphin, and released across 2001 and 2002 as the GameCube. Where a DVD player was included in the PlayStation 2, driving sales, the GameCube was exclusively designed to be a console. It was believed by Yamauchi that this focus, as well as a low price compared to its competitors, and hardware that would allow developers to "easily create games", would set it apart from its competitors.

=== Post-Nintendo presidency ===
On 24 May 2002, Yamauchi resigned as president of Nintendo, once again becoming chairman of the board of directors. He was succeeded by Satoru Iwata, leader of Nintendo's Corporate Planning Division. On 29 June 2005, citing his age and confidence in the company, he resigned from the board. Though he refused his retirement pension, reportedly around $9 to $14 million, he remained Nintendo's largest shareholder; as of 2008, he owned 10% of the company.

In his retirement, Yamauchi donated money to build a cancer treatment center in Kyoto, and founded Shigureden, a museum of poetry (Ogura Hyakunin Isshu) in Kyoto.

== Personal life ==
In 1950, Inaba gave birth to a daughter named Yōko, who would marry Minoru Arakawa, selected by Yamauchi to lead Nintendo's American subsidiary. Inaba had several miscarriages and was often ill. In 1957, she gave birth to another daughter, Fujiko and, shortly after, a son named Katsuhito. She died on 29 July 2012, aged 82. Katsuhito has a son named Banjō Yamauchi, and their names are cited as the origin of the title of Banjo-Kazooie.

Years after abandoning the family, Yamauchi's father returned to see him; Yamauchi refused to speak to him. When Yamauchi was close to 30, his father died of a stroke. At the funeral, Yamauchi met his father's wife and their four daughters, whom he had never known about. He grieved for months, regretting that he had ignored his father, and began making visits to his father's grave.

Yamauchi has been described as a stern man with a single-minded focus on business. His children disliked that he spent more time on Nintendo than them. Because of his tendency to fire employees who disagreed with him, he was characterized as an autocratic leader by Henk Rogers, pivotal to the success of the Game Boy through the release of an accompanying version of Tetris. Notably for the head of a company dedicated to them, he rarely played video games; among the exceptions is Igo: Kyuu Roban Taikyoku, developed by Rogers, and based on the board game Go. More so, he was interested in games which used hanafuda, particularly Go, in which he achieved a high rank.

== Ownership of the Seattle Mariners ==
In 1991, the Seattle Mariners were put up for sale; if a local owner could not be found, the team would be moved to Florida. Seeking to prevent this, a consortium of Seattle-area business owners formed The Baseball Club of Seattle, and searched for someone who could contribute a substantial amount of capital. When Microsoft owner Bill Gates declined to help, Slade Gorton, a Senator from Washington who had interacted with Nintendo during the Senate's hearings on IP theft, contacted Yamauchi through Howard Lincoln, CEO of Nintendo of America. Thankful to Seattle, where NoA is located, for their support of the company, Yamauchi agreed to the proposal, offering to contribute $75 million out of a bid of $125 million. The Mariners were interested, but Major League Baseball was not, objecting to the control of 60% of the team by someone from Japan. Only after facing sustained pressure, including from Texas Rangers owner George W. Bush, did they relent, and even then, Yamauchi was forbidden from owning more than 50% of the voting interest.

As an owner, Yamauchi was rather hands-off, assigning his rights to the Mariners to Nintendo of America, and never attending a game. The one game he did plan to attend, to be held in Kyoto in 2003, was moved to the U.S. due to the impending Iraq War.

== Death ==
On 19 September 2013, aged 85, Yamauchi died of complications of pneumonia. Nintendo released a statement stating that its staff members were mourning the loss of their former president.

Following Yamauchi's death, his son Katsuhito Yamauchi and grandson Banjō Yamauchi inherited Nintendo shares held by the family and sold more than one billion dollars worth of stock to Nintendo.

== In popular culture ==
- Hiroshi was portrayed by Togo Igawa in the 2023 historical fiction film Tetris.
