= Šamac =

Šamac or SAMAC can refer to:

- Šamac, Bosnia and Herzegovina, a town on the right bank of the river Sava, in Bosnia
  - FK Borac Šamac, an association football club
- Slavonski Šamac, a town on the left bank of the river Sava, in Croatia
- Saga Arashiyama Museum of Arts and Culture, a museum in Kyoto, Japan
