= Gunpei Yokoi =

Japanese video game designer (1941–1997)

- 横井 軍平
- Yokoi in 1994
- Born: 10 September 1941; Kyoto, Empire of Japan
- Died: 4 October 1997 (aged 56); Komatsu, Ishikawa, Japan
- Burial place: Kyoto, Japan
- Education: Doshisha University
- Occupations: Toy maker; game designer; game producer
- Years active: 1965–1997
- Employers: Nintendo (1965–1996); Koto Laboratory (1996–1997)

Gunpei Yokoi (Japanese: 横井 軍平, Hepburn: Yokoi Gunpei; 10 September 1941 – 4 October 1997), sometimes transliterated as Gumpei Yokoi, was a Japanese toy maker and video game designer. As a long-time Nintendo employee, he was best known as the original designer of several notable Nintendo products, including the Ultra Hand toy, the Game & Watch and Game Boy handheld game systems, as well as the producer of a few critically acclaimed franchises such as Donkey Kong, Metroid, and Kid Icarus.

== Career ==
Yokoi graduated from Doshisha University with a degree in electronics. He was first hired by Nintendo in 1965 to maintain the assembly-line machines used to manufacture its hanafuda cards.

In 1966, Hiroshi Yamauchi, president of Nintendo, came to a hanafuda factory where Yokoi was working and took notice of a toy, an extending arm that Yokoi made for his own amusement during spare time while doing maintenance. Yamauchi ordered Yokoi to develop it as a proper product for the Christmas rush. The Ultra Hand was a huge success, and Yokoi was asked to work on other Nintendo toys, including the Ten Billion Barrel puzzle, a miniature remote-controlled vacuum cleaner called the Chiritory, a baseball-throwing machine called the Ultra Machine, and a "Love Tester". He worked on toys until the company decided to make video games in 1974, when he became one of its first game designers, only preceded by Genyo Takeda. While traveling on the Shinkansen, Yokoi supposedly saw a bored businessman playing with an LCD calculator by pressing the buttons. Yokoi then got the idea for a watch that doubled as a miniature video gaming pastime.

In 1981, Yamauchi appointed Yokoi to supervise Donkey Kong, an arcade game created by Shigeru Miyamoto. Yokoi explained many of the intricacies of game design to Miyamoto at the beginning of his career, and the project only came to be approved after Yokoi brought Miyamoto's game ideas to the president's attention.

After the worldwide success of Donkey Kong, Yokoi continued to work with Miyamoto on the next Mario game, Mario Bros. He proposed the multiplayer concept and convinced his co-worker to give Mario some superhuman abilities, such as the ability to jump unharmed from great heights.

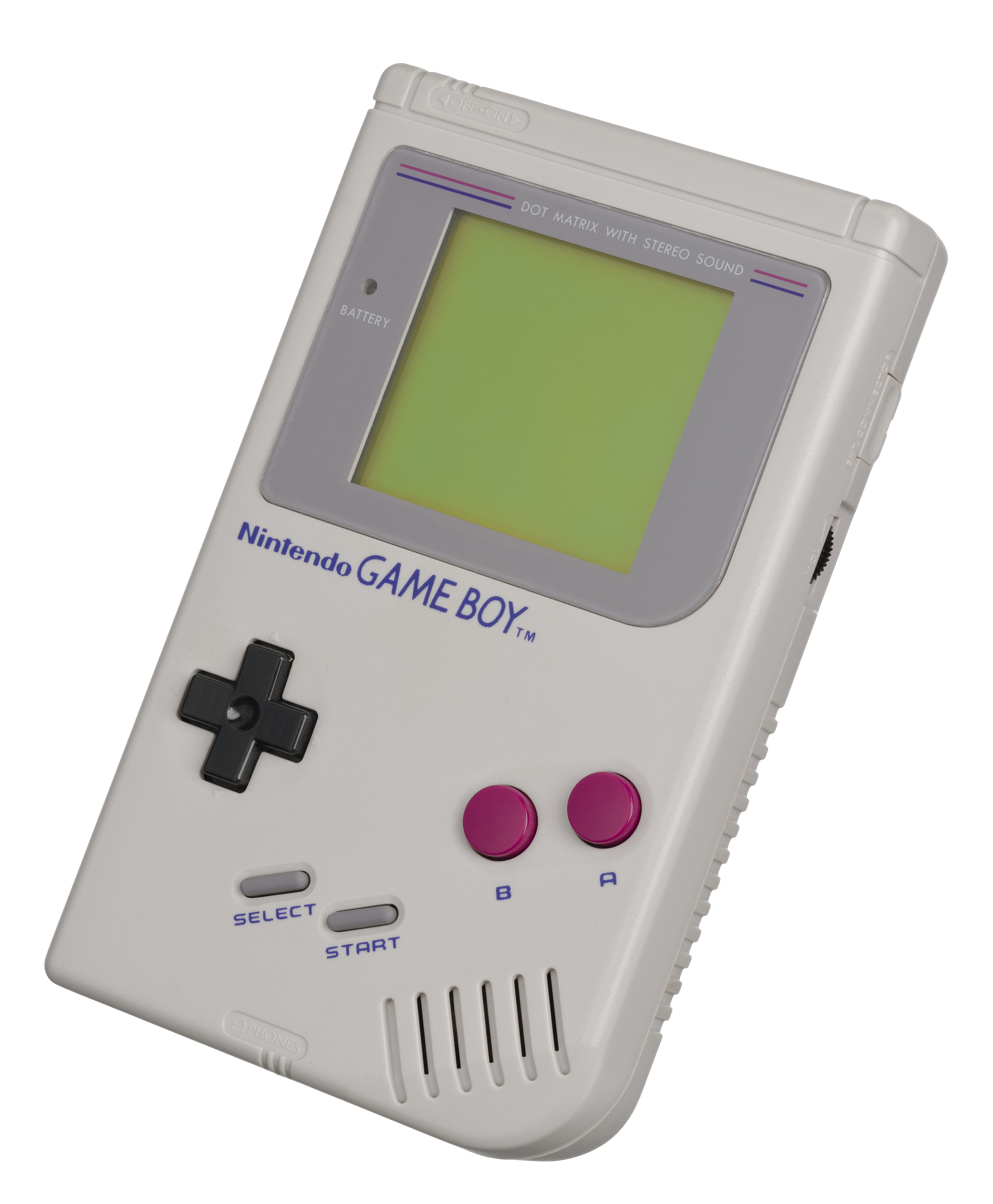
Yokoi is best known for his contribution in the creation of the Game Boy.

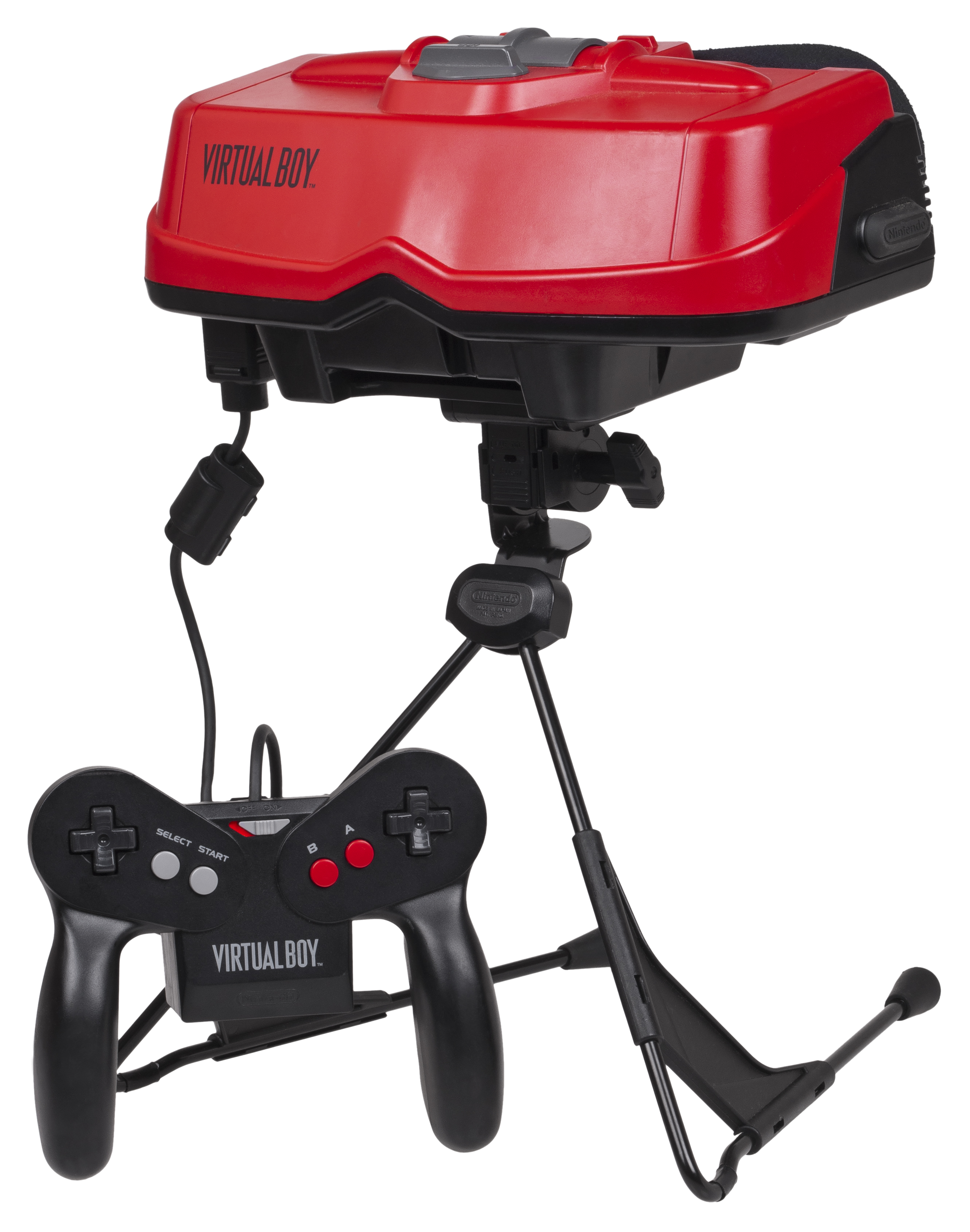
Yokoi's Virtual Boy (1995)

After Mario Bros., Yokoi produced several R&D1 games, such as Kid Icarus and Metroid. He designed R.O.B. and the Game Boy, the latter of which became a worldwide success. Another of his creations, the Virtual Boy, was a commercial failure. Nintendo has denied that the Virtual Boy's poor performance in the market was the reason for Yokoi's subsequent departure from the company, holding that his retirement was "absolutely coincidental" to the market performance of any Nintendo hardware. According to his Nintendo and Koto colleague Yoshihiro Taki, Yokoi had originally decided to retire at age 50 to do as he pleased but had simply delayed it. According to David Sheff's book Game Over, Yokoi never actually intended for the console to be released in its present form. However, Nintendo pushed the Virtual Boy to market so that it could focus development resources on the Nintendo 64.

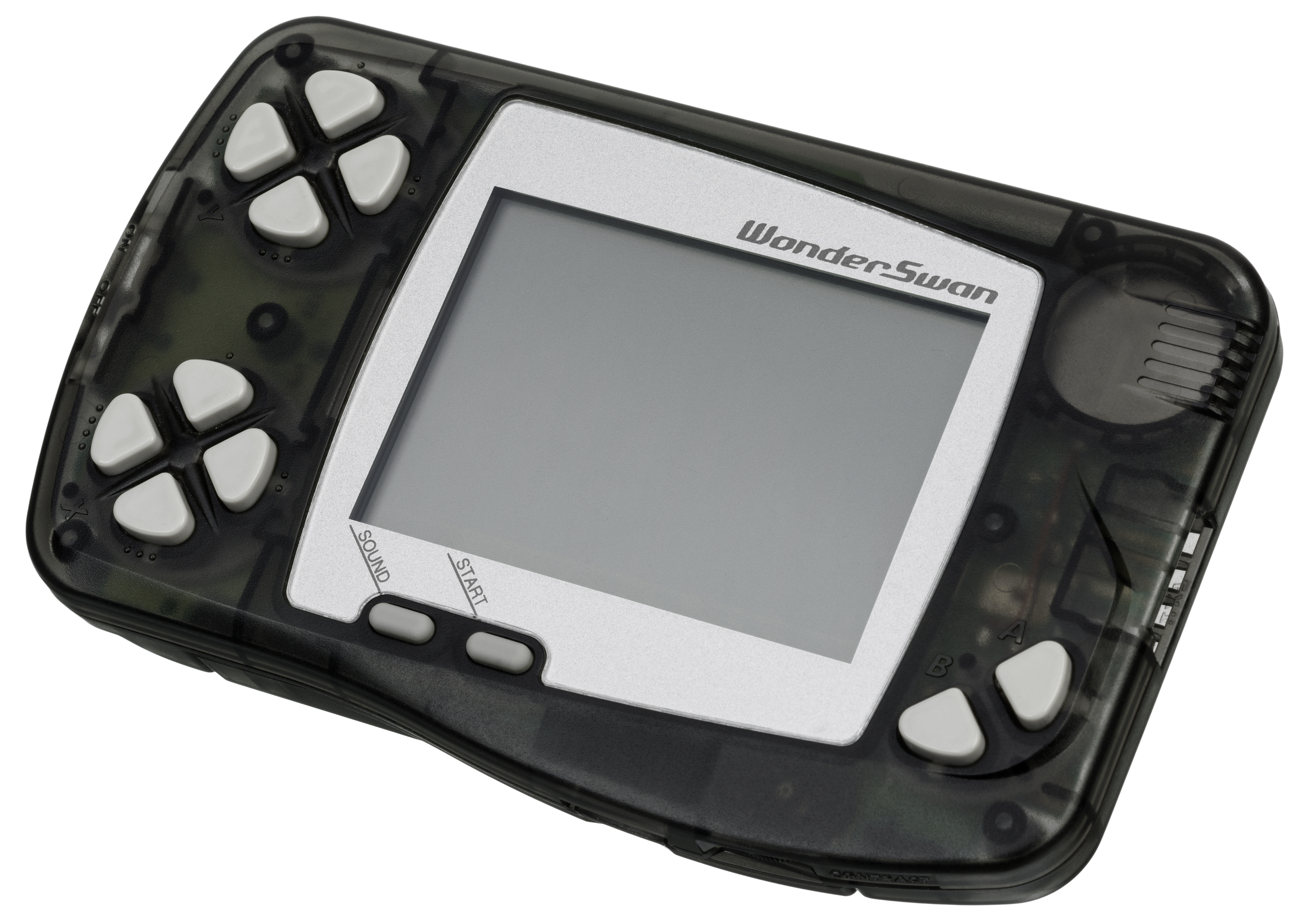
WonderSwan

Amid the failure of the Virtual Boy and the launch of the more successful Game Boy Pocket, Yokoi left Nintendo on 15 August 1996, after thirty-one years at the company. Leaving with several of his subordinates to form a new company called Koto, Yokoi led the development of the Bandai WonderSwan handheld game console.

== Design philosophy ==
Yokoi said "The Nintendo way of adapting technology is not to look for the state of the art but to utilize mature technology that can be mass-produced cheaply." He articulated his philosophy of "Lateral Thinking with Withered Technology" (枯れた技術の水平思考, Kareta Gijutsu no Suihei Shikō) (also translated as "Lateral Thinking with Seasoned Technology"), in the book Yokoi Gunpei Game House. "Withered technology" in this context refers to mature technologies which are well understood and tend to be more affordable and reliable. "Lateral thinking" refers to finding innovative ways of using such technology. Yokoi held that toys and games do not necessarily require cutting-edge technology; novel and fun gameplay are more important. In the interview, he suggested that expensive cutting-edge technology can get in the way of developing a new product.

The Game & Watch was developed based on this philosophy. At the time of its development, Sharp and Casio were fiercely competing in the digital calculator market. For this reason, there was a glut of liquid crystal displays and semiconductors. The "lateral thinking" was to find an original and fun use for this cheap and abundant technology. The NES and Game Boy were developed under a similar philosophy. In the handheld market, Yokoi's refusal to equip the Game Boy with a color LCD (at the time, cutting-edge technology) gave the device a much longer battery life and is often cited as a primary reason it prevailed against Sega's Game Gear and Atari's Lynx.

Satoru Iwata, CEO of Nintendo from 2002 until his death in 2015, said this philosophy has been passed on to Yokoi's disciples, such as Miyamoto, and it continues to be echoed in later Nintendo products like the highly successful Wii. The Wii's internal technology was similar to that of Nintendo's previous home console, the GameCube, and was not as advanced in terms of computational capability and multimedia versatility compared to its competitors: the Xbox 360 and PlayStation 3. Instead, the system offered something completely different by introducing motion-based controls to the console market in an attempt to change the ways video games are played, and consequently, to widen the audience for video games in general. This strategy demonstrated Nintendo's belief that graphical advancement is not the only way to make progress in gaming technology; indeed, after the Wii's overwhelming success, Sony and Microsoft released their own motion control peripherals. Nintendo's emphasis on peripherals for the Wii has also been pointed to as an example of Yokoi's "lateral thinking" at work.

== Death ==
On 4 October 1997, Yokoi was riding in a car driven by his associate Etsuo Kiso on the Hokuriku Expressway, when the vehicle rear-ended a truck. After the two men had left the car to inspect the damage, Yokoi was hit and injured by a passing car. The driver of the car that hit Yokoi in the second accident was Gen Tsushima, a member of the tourism industry. Yokoi's death was confirmed two hours later, his only serious injury being a fractured rib. Though the whereabouts of Yokoi's ashes have not been publicly disclosed, his tombstone is known to have been designed by Miyamoto, who also eulogized him at his funeral, and lists several of his lifetime achievements for Nintendo over the years, from Ultra Machine to Game Boy.

== Legacy ==
The title of his main biography from 2010 translates from Japanese as Father of Games – Gunpei Yokoi, the Man Who Created Nintendo's DNA. A 1997 book's title translates to Yokoi's House of Gaming, which was explored in English in 2010 by Tokyo Scum Brigade. A 2014 book about him is Gunpei Yokoi: The Life & Philosophy of Nintendo's God of Toys.

In 2003, Yokoi posthumously received the Lifetime Achievement Award of the International Game Developers Association. GameTrailers placed him on their lists for the "Top Ten Game Creators". An art gallery in Japan created an art exhibit in 2010 titled "The Man Who Was Called the God of Games" featuring all his key Nintendo works. In 1999, Bandai began releasing a series of handheld puzzle games named Gunpey as a tribute to their original creator, Yokoi.

== Works ==
=== Designer ===
- Ultra Hand (1966)
- Ultra Machine (1968)
- Love Tester (1969)
- Light Ray Gun SP Series (1970)
- Eleconga (1970)
- NB Block Crater (1970)
- Ultra Scope (1971)
- Light Ray Telephone LT (1971)
- Lefty RX (1972)
- Time Shock (1972)
- Laser Clay Shooting System (1973)
- Wild Gunman (1974)
- Shooting Trainer (1974)
- Light Ray Gun Custom Series (1976)
- Kōsenjū Duck Hunt (1976)
- Battle Shark Skyhawk (1977)
- Radio Controlled Cleaner (1979)
- Nintendo Tumbler Puzzle (1980)
- Game & Watch (1980)
- Computer Mahjong (1982)
- Famicom Controller (1983)
- Video Shooting Series light gun (1984)
- R.O.B. (1985)
- Game Boy (1989)
- Super Scope (1992)
- Virtual Boy (1995)
- Game Boy Pocket (1996)
- Henoheno (1997)
- WonderSwan (1999, released posthumously)
- Gunpey (1999, released posthumously)

=== Producer ===
- Donkey Kong (1981)
- Donkey Kong Jr. (1982)
- Mario Bros. (1983)
- Donkey Kong 3 (1983)
- Wild Gunman (1984)
- Duck Hunt (1984)
- Hogan's Alley (1984)
- Urban Champion (1984)
- Balloon Fight (1985)
- Wrecking Crew (1985)
- Stack-Up (1985)
- Gyromite (1985)
- Gumshoe (1986)
- Metroid (1986)
- Kid Icarus (1986)
- Nakayama Miho no Tokimeki High School (1987)
- Famicom Detective Club: The Missing Heir (1988)
- Famicom Wars (1988)
- Tetris (1989)
- Super Mario Land (1989)
- Famicom Detective Club: The Girl Who Stands Behind (1989)
- Solar Striker (1990)
- Fire Emblem: Shadow Dragon and the Blade of Light (1990)
- Dr. Mario (1990)
- Balloon Kid (1990)
- Metroid II: Return of Samus (1991)
- Kid Icarus: Of Myths and Monsters (1991)
- Fire Emblem Gaiden (1992)
- X (1992)
- Mario Paint (1992)
- Super Mario Land 2: 6 Golden Coins (1992)
- Battle Clash (1992)
- Yoshi's Cookie (1992)
- Metal Combat: Falcon's Revenge (1993)
- Wario Land: Super Mario Land 3 (1994)
- Fire Emblem: Mystery of the Emblem (1994)
- Mario's Tennis (1995)
- Mario Clash (1995)
- Panel de Pon (1995)
- Virtual Boy Wario Land (1995)
- Kirby's Block Ball (1995)
- 3D Tetris (1996)
- Fire Emblem: Genealogy of the Holy War (1996)
- Zero Racers (2026, released posthumously)
