= Ultra Hand =

Mechanical toy made by Nintendo in 1966

- Type: Reach extender
- Invented by: Gunpei Yokoi
- Company: Nintendo
- Country: Japan

Ultra Hand (Note: Japanese: ウルトラハンド, Hepburn: Urutorahanndo) is a toy that was manufactured by Nintendo in the late 1960s. It was created in 1966 by Gunpei Yokoi, who later designed the Love Tester, the D-pad, the Game & Watch, the Game Boy, and the WonderSwan.

Ultra Hand consists of several criss-cross-connected plastic elements, and operates on the "lazy tongs" pantograph principle. One end of the Ultra Hand has scissor-like handles and is operated like scissors, extending when the handles are pinched together and retracting when they are parted. On the other end of the Ultra Hand are two bowl-shaped grips with which ball-like objects can be gripped when the Ultra Hand is fully extended. Three colored balls were included in the Ultra Hand package, along with stands on which the balls can rest.

Ultra Hand was a commercial success, selling more than one million units. It is the first of several toys developed by Yokoi that helped to save the company from financial difficulties.

== In video games ==
A WiiWare game titled Grill-Off with Ultra Hand!, based on a previous Japanese game, was released in North America on March 31, 2010 as an exclusive to Club Nintendo members. The game features the Ultra Hand stretching out to grab cooked meats from barbecue grills. In single-player mode, the goal is to last as long as possible. In two-player mode, players compete for the most points in 90 seconds.

The Ultrahand ability in The Legend of Zelda: Tears of the Kingdom is named after the Ultra Hand, taking the form of waves of energy that allow Link to grab, reposition, and combine objects.

The Ultra Hand has appeared in various other Nintendo games, including Splatoon 3, WarioWare Gold, and Mario Kart 8.

== See also ==
- Love Tester
- Ultra Machine
- Color TV-Game
- List of Nintendo products
