= Gunpey =

Series of puzzle video games

- Logo of the WonderSwan version
- Genre: Puzzle
- Developers: Koto Laboratory (1999–2000, 2006); Tose Co., Ltd (1999); Q Entertainment (2006); Art Co., Ltd (2006)
- Publishers: Bandai (1999–2004); Bandai Namco Entertainment (2006, 2017)
- Creator: Gunpei Yokoi
- Platforms: WonderSwan; PlayStation; Arcade; WonderSwan Color; mobile phone; Nintendo DS; PlayStation Portable; iOS; Android
- First release: Gunpey (WonderSwan); March 4, 1999
- Latest release: Gunpey (PSP); November 14, 2006

Gunpey (Japanese: グンペイ, Hepburn: Gunpei), often stylized as Gun Pey or GunPey, is a puzzle video game series created by Koto Laboratory and published by Bandai Namco Entertainment. The first game in the series, Gunpey, was released as launch title for the WonderSwan in 1999, and has since seen versions published on the WonderSwan Color, PlayStation, arcades, mobile phones, Nintendo DS, PlayStation Portable, iOS, and Android. Gameplay consists of moving line fragments vertically in a grid in order to make a single branching line, connected horizontally from one end of the screen to the other. The objective often differs depending on the selected game mode.

The series was named as a tribute to Gunpei Yokoi, known for developing several handheld consoles such as Nintendo's Game Boy, Virtual Boy, and Bandai's WonderSwan.

== Gameplay ==
Screenshot of "Stage Mode"

Gunpey features a 5×10 cell grid and line fragments spread across it, varying from shapes such as caret (∧), inverted caret (∨), left slash (\), and right slash (/). The player controls a cursor that can be moved around the play-field. The cursor can only flip vertically-adjacent cells, allowing the player to move line fragments or switch them with another segment. The goal of the game is to piece the fragments together to form a connected line horizontally from one end of the screen to the other. After a line is completed, it will temporarily flash before disappearing, during which the player can connect additional branching segments to achieve a combo bonus. A bonus is also awarded when all of the line segments are cleared from the play-field.

- "Endless Mode" features line fragments appearing from the bottom of the grid and gradually move to up to the top as more pieces appear. The rate at which the new pieces scroll up from the bottom increases as the levels go on. The game ends if any line fragments reach the top of the screen before they have been assembled into a full line.
- "Stage Mode" bears a resemblance to Endless Mode. The goal is to clear lines using a specific number of line fragments as they appear from the bottom of the grid. Once the number of lines has been cleared, the player can move on to the next stage. The number of used line fragments needed to clear a stage and the rate of new line fragments appearing increases as more stages are cleared.
- "Puzzle Mode" features a specific number of lines are set per each stage. All the line fragments must be connected without a single line remaining.
- "Story Mode" is a mode where the player battles against the CPU in order to progress the story. The goal is to clear lines with a certain number of lines similar to Puzzle Mode, however the CPU adds several mechanics that may affect progress such as shadowed-panels, side-scrolling grid, and falling bombs that can be thrown upwards against the CPU. A vertical gauge is also featured. If the gauge is filled completely, the shadowed-panels disappear. The Story revolves around a frog named Vincent as he saves a cat named Sherry from a group of outlaws. In Tarepanda no Gunpey, the story revolves around Tarepanda as he rolls around reaching specific destinations around the Earth and collecting photos of different Tarepanda slowly becoming a pile of Tarepandas.
- "VS mode" allows two players to battle against each other. Players can choose difficulties between High, Normal, Low, and Poor. "High" rewards less SP per clearing a line as "Poor" rewards more SP.

== Games ==
Release timeline
1999	Gunpey
1999	Tarepanda No Gunpey
1999	Gunpey (PlayStation)
2000	Gunpey EX
2001–2003
2004	Gunpey (mobile)
2005
2006	Gunpey DS
2006	Gunpey (PSP)
2007–2016
2017	Gunpeyard Flower Carnival

Gunpey was preceded by the 1997 handheld electronic game Professor Henoheno, (Note: (プロフェッサー へのへの)) which was developed by Koto Laboratory and published by Hiro Co., Ltd. as part of its LCD Keychain Series. Named after a shortened form of Henohenomoheji, gameplay is largely identical to later Gunpey titles, save for the fact that the play-field is only 4×6.

=== Original series ===
==== Gunpey (WonderSwan) ====
Gunpey was first released on March 4, 1999 in Japan, as a launch title for the WonderSwan. Developed by Koto Laboratory, the game is played exclusively in the vertical orientation. The game was later re-released in a special console bundle, celebrating 200,000 copies sold.

==== Tarepanda no Gunpey ====
Tarepanda no Gunpey (Note: Tarepanda's Gunpey (たれぱんだのぐんぺい)) was released on December 9, 1999 in Japan for the WonderSwan. Made in collaboration with San-X, the game is themed around the company's Tarepanda character. A special console bundle was also released, which included a Tarepanda-themed WonderSwan.

==== Gunpey (PlayStation) ====
Gunpey was first released on December 16, 1999 in Japan for the PlayStation. Developed by Tose, the game is an enhanced port of the WonderSwan original. This version was later released for arcades in 2000 by Banpresto.

==== Gunpey EX ====
Gunpey EX was first released on December 9, 2000 in Japan, as a launch title for the WonderSwan Color. Developed by Koto Laboratory, the game features differently colored line fragments, where if a player completes a line made up of only one color, they are awarded extra points. While the Story Mode was removed, the game supports the Wondergate peripheral, allowing for online ranking battles.

==== Gunpey (mobile phone) ====
Gunpey was first released on October 4, 2004 in Japan for mobile phones, through NTT DoCoMo. Its gameplay is based on Gunpey EX.

=== Rebirth series ===
==== Gunpey DS ====
Gunpey DS, known as Gunpey Rebirth (Note: Oto o tsunagou! Gunpei Riba~su♪ (音をつなごう!グンペイりば～す♪, lit. "Connect the Sound! Gunpey Rebi-rth♪")) in Japan, was first released on October 19, 2006 for the Nintendo DS. Developed by Q Entertainment with assistance from Koto Laboratory, players have the option of using the touchscreen to slide fragments up or down, or go with the classic control scheme, and can choose from nine playable characters, each with a different skin and sounds during gameplay. Additionally, there are two modes of play: "Original", and "Break". "Break" mode differs from "Original" in that any line fragments above a completed line will drop down after that line has been cleared.

The game was later released in North America on November 17, 2006, Europe on March 30, 2007, and Australia on April 13, 2007.

==== Gunpey (PSP) ====
Gunpey, known as Gunpey-R (Note: Gunpey-R (グンペイ・リバース, lit. "Gunpey Rebirth")) in Japan, was first released on November 14, 2006 in North America for the PlayStation Portable, making it the first game in the series to be released in the West. Developed by Q Entertainment, the game has a visual presentation similar to the company's Lumines series, and has a total of 40 skins, which slightly alter gameplay. Additionally, the player is given the option to play in a 10×10 grid for added difficulty.

The game was later released in Japan on January 11, 2007, Europe on March 30, 2007, and Australia on April 13, 2007.

==== Gunpeyard Flower Carnival ====
Gunpeyard Flower Carnival (Note: Gunpey Hana no Kānibaru (ぐんぺい 花のカーニバル, lit. "Gunpey Flower Carnival")) was first released on February 27, 2017 in Japan for iOS and Android. Developed by Bandai Namco Entertainment, the game features a garden theme, with the line fragments represented by worms. It was released worldwide on March 28, 2017, and was subsequently shut down on December 13 that same year.

== Reception ==
Japanese and Western review scores
Game	Famitsu	GameRankings	Metacritic
Gunpey	9/10, 9/10, 8/10, 7/10	-	-
Tarepanda no Gunpey		-	-
Gunpey EX		-	-
Gunpey DS		70.19%	70/100
Gunpey (PSP)		65.78%	62/100

Retro Gamer ranked the original WonderSwan game #2 on its "Top Ten WonderSwan Games" praising its simplicity and variety of modes it offers. Modojo gave Gunpey EX a 3 out of 5 giving it a mix review stating: "The fact is Gunpey's focus on individual circuits instead of complex combos coupled the clunky vertical shuffling of the wires made it an experience I couldn't lose myself in, like so many other titles. Still, it's good to see that the puzzle genre still has life left, and Gunpey EX is a fairly robust package".

NintendoLife gave the game a 6 out of 10: "The concept just isn't compelling or addictive enough to grant the game classic status and the developers haven't really added anything to change that". GameSpot gave both the DS and PSP version a 7.7 out of 10: "Not only is it fun and challenging, but it's got a crazy sense of style and a rewarding level of difficulty". Eurogamer gave the PSP version 7 out of 10, praising its level designs and difficulty but criticizing the time it takes to play the game. IGN gave the game a 6.1 out of 10: "Gunpey is a somewhat fun puzzle game, but it'll never reach classic status because it's one of those games that relies too much on random placement of tiles". IGN, however, gave the PSP version a less favorable review criticizing the gameplay for it being dull and boring.
