= Nintendo Tumbler Puzzle =

Mathematical puzzle

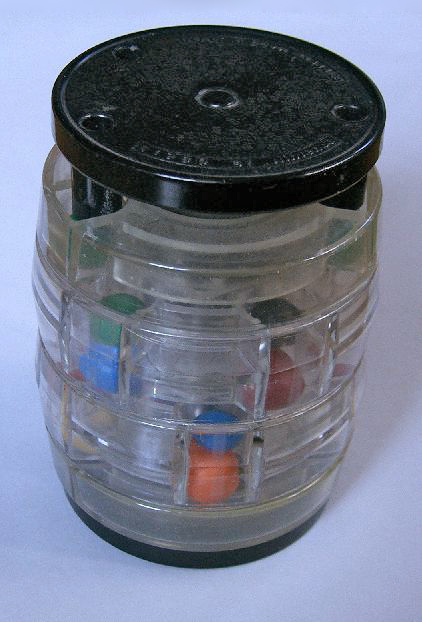
- Type: Puzzle
- Invented by: Gunpei Yokoi
- Company: Nintendo
- Country: Japan
- Materials: Plastic

The Nintendo Tumbler Puzzle, also known as the Ten Billion Barrel in English and originally tenbirion (テンビリオン) in Japanese, is a mathematical and mechanical puzzle. It is one of many mechanical toys invented by Gunpei Yokoi at Nintendo. It was released in 1980 under U.S. patent 4,376,537. The patent expired in March 1995 due to non-payment of a maintenance fee.

== Overview ==
The puzzle consists of a cylinder of transparent plastic divided into six levels, within a black plastic frame. The frame consists of upper and lower discs that are joined through the middle of the cylinder.

The top and bottom levels of the cylinder form a single piece, but between them are two rotatable pieces each two levels high. Each of the four central levels is divided into five chambers each containing a colored ball. The top and bottom levels have only three chambers, containing either three balls or three parts of the frame depending on the relative position of frame and cylinder.

The balls in three of the five resulting columns of chambers can be moved up or down one level by raising or lowering the frame relative to the transparent cylinder.

The object is to sort the balls, so that each of the five columns contains balls of a single color.

== Cameos ==
As a tribute to the late creator of the puzzle and former Metroid series producer, Gunpei Yokoi, the puzzle has a small cameo appearance in Metroid Prime for the GameCube. A large-scale version appears in the Phazon Mines in which Samus Aran uses the Morph Ball to interact with it by rotating the levels and climbing the side of it with magnetic rails.

The puzzle appears in Animal Crossing: New Leaf, as one of the prizes from Redd during the fireworks displays throughout August.

It is an easter egg in The Legend of Zelda: Majora's Mask 3D.

In WarioWare Gold, it appears as one of the microgames, requiring the matching of 4 of its marbles.
