= Saga Arashiyama Museum of Arts and Culture =

Museum in Kyoto, Japan

Coordinates: 35°00′49″N 135°40′26″E

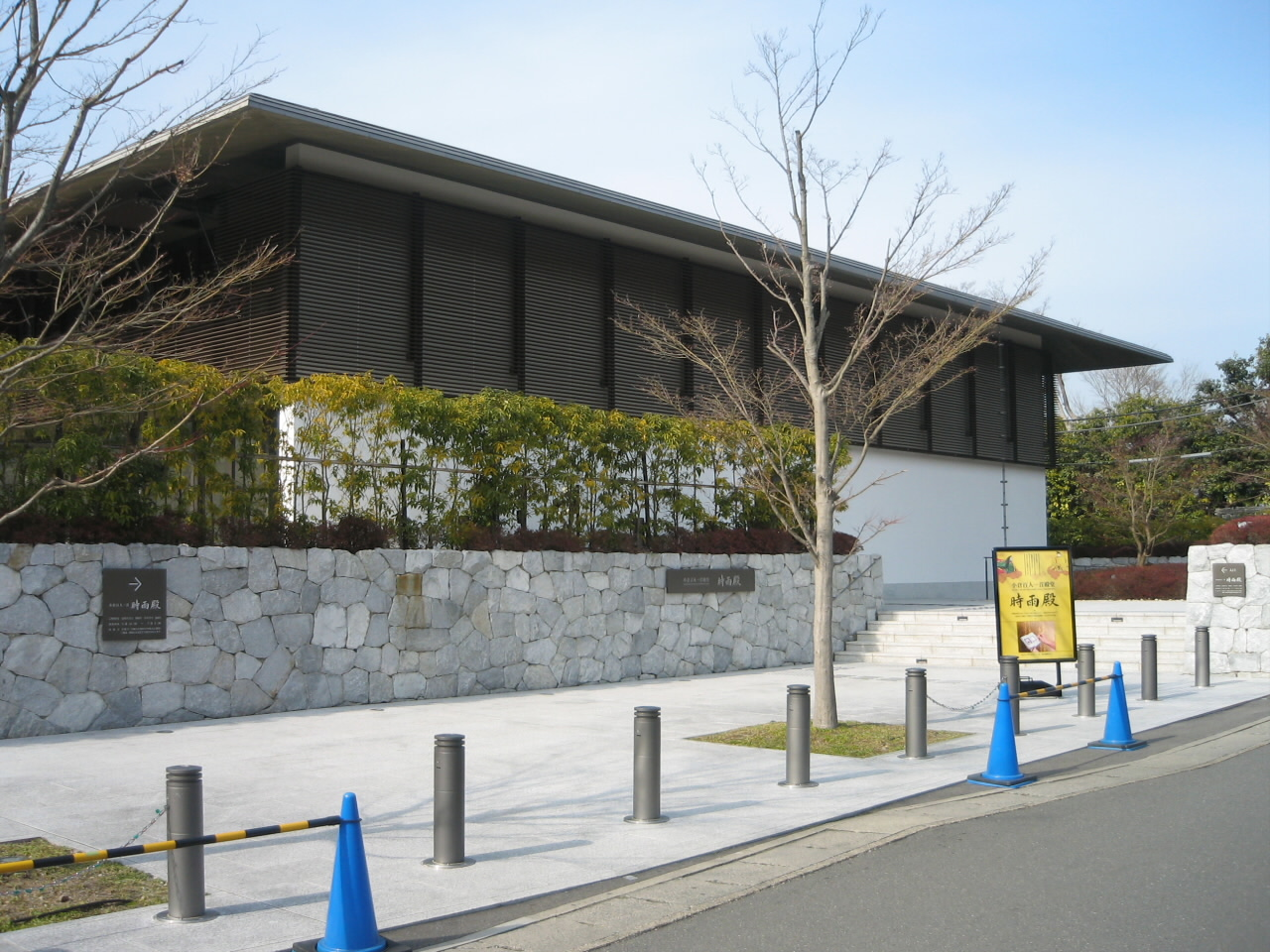
Exterior of Shigureden

The Saga Arashiyama Museum of Arts and Culture (SAMAC; formerly known as Shigureden (時雨殿)) is a museum in Arashiyama, Kyoto, Japan, centered on the Ogura Hyakunin Isshu anthology of waka poems compiled by Fujiwara no Teika in the 13th century. The museum was founded by former Nintendo president Hiroshi Yamauchi, who invested more than $20 million in the facility. Shigureden's Autumn Shower Palace hall was designed by Nintendo game producer Shigeru Miyamoto.

The museum opened its doors on January 27, 2006, featuring an interactive exhibition in its park with poetry-related karuta (like the Uta-garuta), and animated floors, navigated through the use of special Nintendo DS consoles. The museum closed down for renovations on April 1, 2011, and re-opened on March 17, 2012. It was closed for further renovations on March 21, 2017. It then reopened on November 1, 2018 as the Saga Arashiyama Museum of Arts & Culture (SAMAC).
