= WonderSwan =

Handheld game console

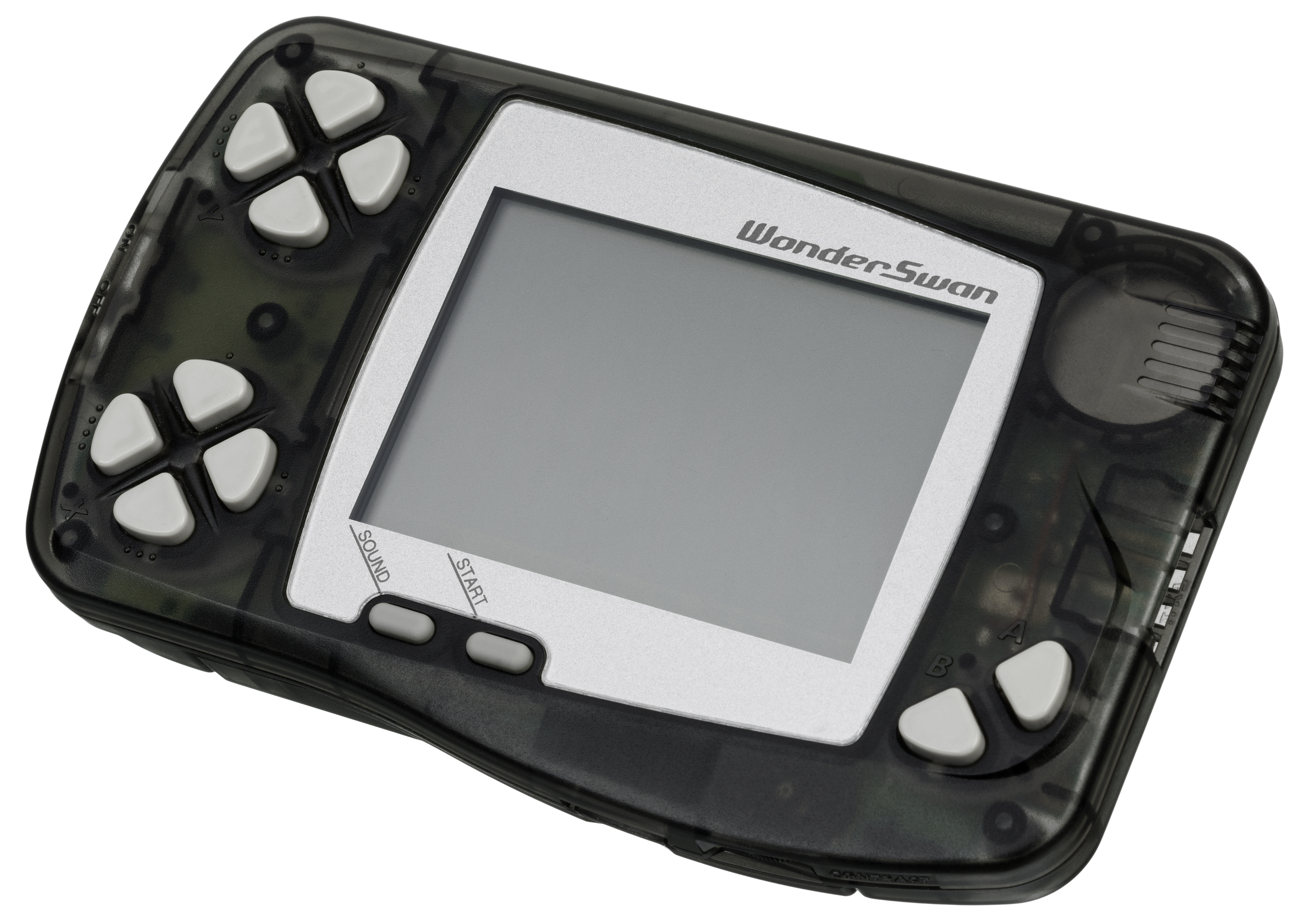
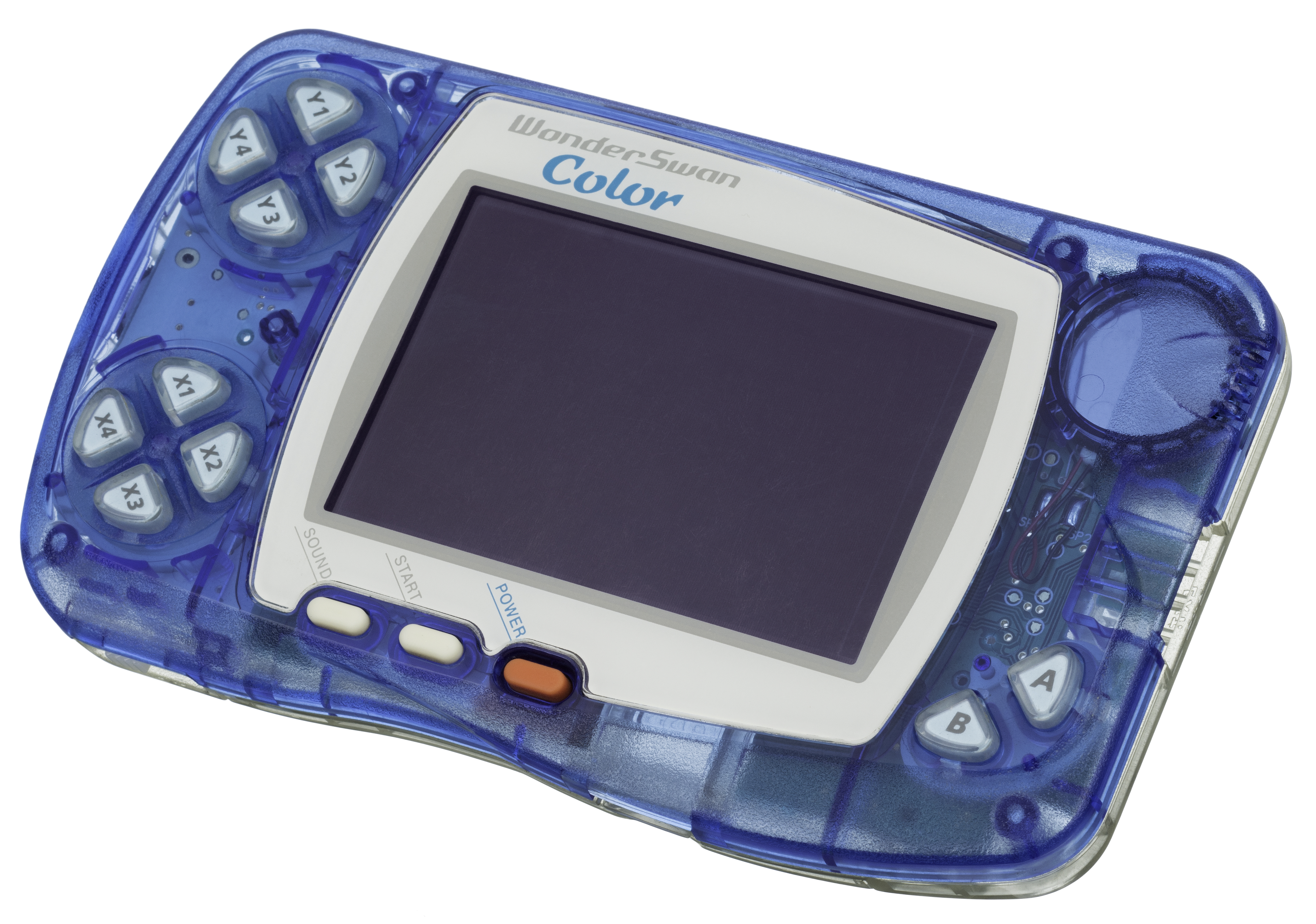
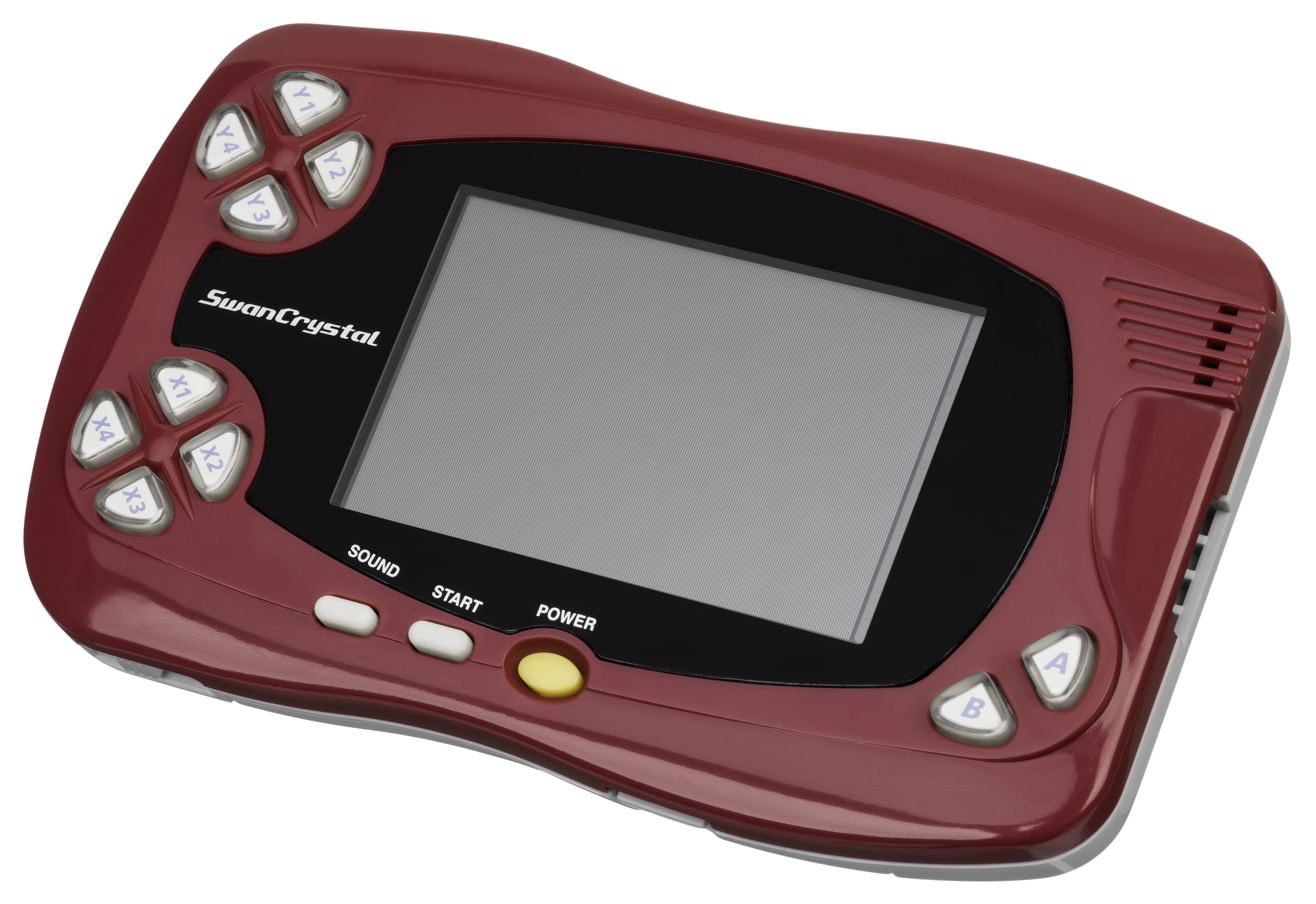
- Top: WonderSwan; Middle: WonderSwan Color; Bottom: SwanCrystal
- Manufacturer: Bandai
- Type: Handheld game console
- Generation: Sixth
- Released: WonderSwan: JP: March 4, 1999; WonderSwan Color: JP: December 9, 2000; SwanCrystal: JP: July 12, 2002
- Lifespan: 1999–2003
- Introductory price: ¥4,800 (WonderSwan) ¥6,800 (WonderSwan Color) ¥7,800 (SwanCrystal)
- Discontinued: 2003
- Units sold: 3.5 million (combined); 1.55 million (WonderSwan); 1.1 million (WonderSwan Color) +850 thousand units (SwanCrystal)
- Media: ROM cartridge
- CPU: NEC V30 MZ @ 3.072 MHz
- Memory: 64 KB RAM
- Display: FSTN (WonderSwan, WonderSwan Color); TFT LCD (SwanCrystal); 224 × 144
- Sound: 4 PCM channels
- Power: 1 × AA battery 40 hours (WonderSwan); 20 hours (WonderSwan Color); 15 hours (SwanCrystal)
- Predecessor: Design Master Senshi Mangajukuu
- Related: Tamagotchi; Digimon virtual pet

The WonderSwan (Note: Japanese: ワンダースワン, Hepburn: WandāSuwan) is a handheld game console released in Japan by Bandai. Developed in collaboration with Gunpei Yokoi's company Koto Laboratory, it was the final piece of hardware Yokoi worked on before his death in 1997. Launched in Japan in March 1999 during the sixth generation of video game consoles, the WonderSwan was followed by two upgraded models, the WonderSwan Color and SwanCrystal, before Bandai discontinued the line in 2003. Throughout its lifespan, no version of the WonderSwan was officially released outside Japan.

Powered by a 16-bit processor, the WonderSwan was designed as both a more powerful and affordable alternative to its 8-bit competitors, Nintendo's Game Boy Color and SNK's Neo Geo Pocket Color, while offering notably long battery life from a single AA battery. Later iterations improved the handheld’s display, introducing color for enhanced visual quality. One of its distinguishing features was its dual-orientation design, allowing gameplay in both vertical and horizontal modes. The WonderSwan also cultivated a unique library, featuring numerous first-party titles based on licensed anime properties and strong third-party support from developers such as Squaresoft, Namco, Capcom and Banpresto.

In total, all variations of the WonderSwan combined to sell an estimated 3.5 million units, capturing up to 8% of the Japanese handheld gaming market at its peak before being overshadowed by Nintendo's Game Boy Advance. In retrospect, despite its limited commercial success, the WonderSwan is often praised for its innovation and potential, as well as its brief yet noteworthy challenge to Nintendo's dominance in the handheld gaming space.

== History ==
Founded in 1950 by Naoharu Yamashina, Bandai was originally a manufacturer of toy cars and plastic models, but became a major player in the toy industry through the licensing of popular anime characters beginning with Tetsuwan Atomu in 1963. In the 1970s, Bandai manufactured both LCD games based on television programs and dedicated consoles. In 1982, the company released the Intellivision in Japan, and in 1985 it became one of the first third-party licensees on the Family Computer. Notably, the company's greatest success in electronic games, was the Tamagotchi virtual pet first released in 1996. Despite plans for Bandai to merge with Sega to form Sega Bandai Ltd. in 1997, the merger was called off suddenly. Bandai's board of directors decided to oppose the merger less than a week after approving it, and Sega in turn decided to accept Bandai's actions at an emergency board meeting later that day. Bandai president Makoto Yamashina took responsibility for failing to gain the support of his company for the merger. As a result, Bandai entered the market without outside support.

Engineer Gunpei Yokoi is known for creating the Game Boy handheld system at Nintendo. After the failure of the Virtual Boy, he left the company in 1996 in order to create his own engineering firm, Koto Laboratory. It was then that Bandai approached Yokoi to create the WonderSwan to compete with the Game Boy. Yokoi was involved in development of the new handheld, but died in 1997 in a car accident before it was released.

The WonderSwan was officially unveiled in Tokyo on October 8, 1998. Bandai chose the name of the system to highlight its aesthetics and technical capabilities because the swan is recognized as an elegant bird with powerful legs that aid its graceful swimming. The company promised a 30-hour battery life, a low retail price, and a launch lineup of roughly fifty games.

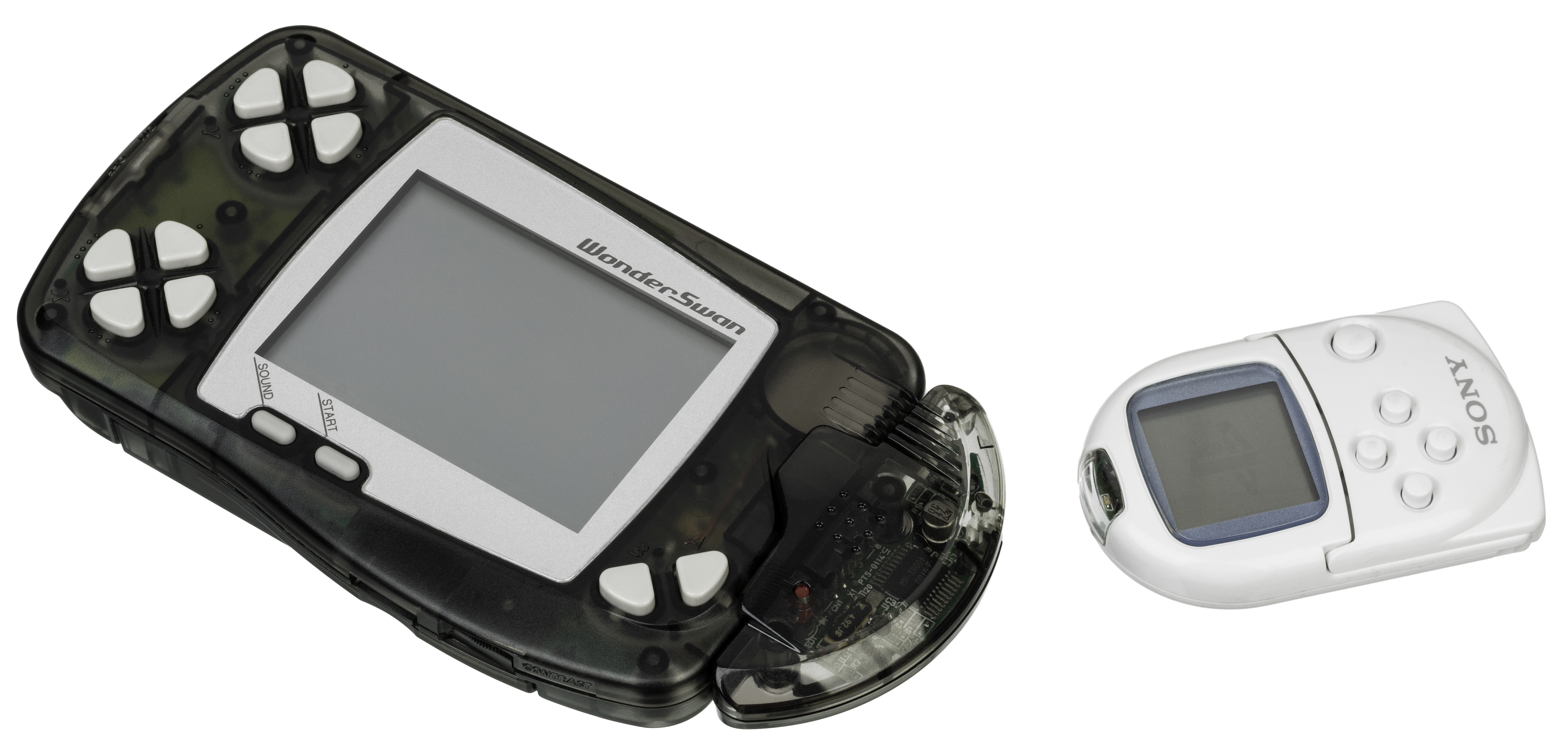
The WonderWave accessory is an infrared communicator that could transfer data between two WonderSwans. It is also compatible with the PocketStation (right) for select Bandai games.

The WonderSwan launched on March 4, 1999 and was available in nine casing colors: pearl white, skeleton green, silver metallic, skeleton pink, blue metallic, skeleton blue, skeleton black, camouflage, and gold. Three limited edition two-tone models were also released in frozen mint, sherbet melon and soda blue. These colors were chosen through an online poll at Bandai’s website, with the metallic and pearl white models being discontinued on July 22 to make room for the special two-tone editions. Despite Nintendo's release of the Game Boy Color five months before, Bandai remained confident that the WonderSwan and its monochromatic FSTN display would perform well because the original black-and-white Game Boy had previously been more successful than its color-screen competitors, the Game Gear and Atari Lynx, on the basis of its battery life and the quality of its game library. With a retail price ¥4,800, the WonderSwan was also cheaper than its competition. In 2000, Bandai signed an agreement with Mattel to bring the handheld to North America, but ultimately decided against a Western release. The exact reason for this is unknown, but the crowded handheld video game console market has been suggested as a factor.

Later that year, Bandai announced the WonderSwan Color (Note: ワンダースワンカラー, WandāSuwan Karā) which would incorporate a passive matrix FSTN color screen while retaining backward compatibility with the original WonderSwan. It was released on December 9 in Japan and was available in pearl blue, pearl pink, crystal black, crystal blue, and crystal orange. The launch was a moderate success, with the system selling 270,632 units in under a month after its release. Before the WonderSwan Color could be released, Nintendo announced the Game Boy Advance, which featured superior hardware. The WonderSwan Color still retailed at a lower price point at ¥6,800 compared to the Advance at ¥9,800, but despite peaking at 8% of the handheld market share in Japan, the WonderSwan's sales never recovered after the Game Boy Advance reached store shelves in March 2001.

A redesign of the WonderSwan Color, titled SwanCrystal (Note: スワンクリスタル, SuwanKurisutaru), was released in Japan on July 12, 2002 for ¥7,800, ¥1,000 less than the Game Boy Advance. Once again, Bandai held a poll on its website to determine casing colors and released the system in blue violet, wine red, crystal blue, and crystal black. Despite its low price and an improved TFT LCD screen, the SwanCrystal was unable to compete, so Bandai discontinued the WonderSwan line in 2003 due to low demand and backed out of producing video game hardware altogether. In all, the handheld sold 3.5 million units, of which 1.55 million were of the original WonderSwan and at least 1.1 million were of the WonderSwan Color.

== Technical specifications ==
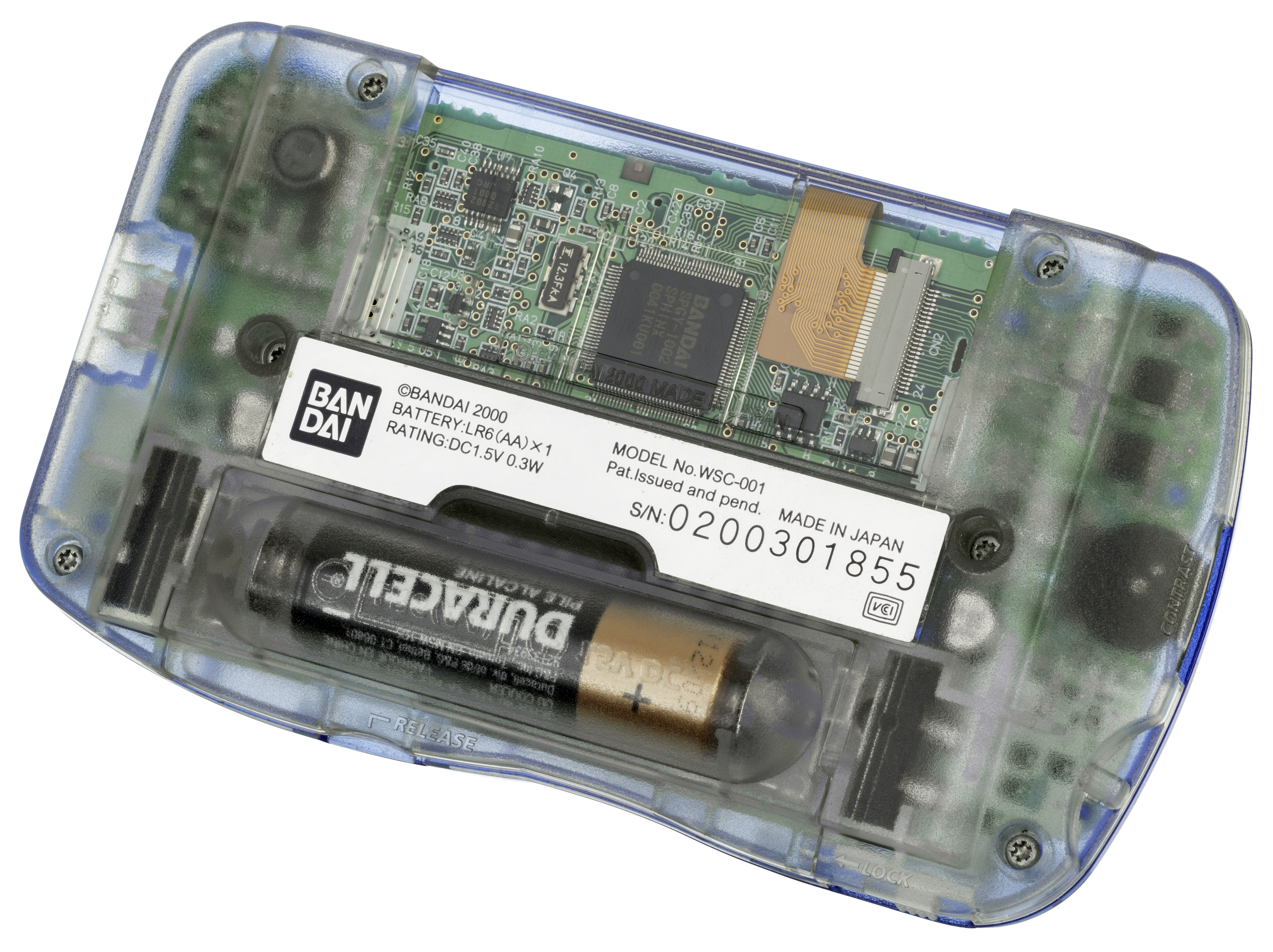
All WonderSwan models are powered by a single AA battery.

The main CPU of the WonderSwan is a 16-bit NEC V30 MZ, a variant of the Intel 8086. The original model's screen is capable of displaying up to 16 shades of gray (up to 8 on screen at once), in contrast to the four displayed by the WonderSwan's main competitor, the Game Boy. Similar to the Atari Lynx, the handheld has an extra set of buttons allowing the console to be played at different angles; for the WonderSwan, these buttons were used to allow gamers to play games in both the portrait and landscape orientations. The WonderSwan series are all powered by a single AA battery, with the original monochrome version having a battery life of 40 hours. It also allows players to record their personal information, such as their name, birth date, and blood type, which can then be accessed and used by the game. Its LCD screen is 2.49 inches (6.3 cm) and displays at a resolution of 224 × 144. Its sound capabilities consist of four wavetable channels, each of which can play 32-sample, 4-bit sounds at selectable volume and pitch levels. Additionally, the second channel can play 8 bit unsigned PCM samples, the third can use hardware sweep, and the fourth can play LFSR based noise.

The physical measurements of the WonderSwan Color are 12.8 by 7.43 by 2.43 centimetres (5.04 in × 2.93 in × 0.96 in), slightly larger than the original WonderSwan, and it weighs 96 grams (3.4 oz). Its CPU is a 3.072 MHz NEC V30 MZ, and it includes 512 kbit of RAM, which is shared between the video RAM and the work RAM. The screen on the WonderSwan Color can display up to 241 colors out of a palette of 4096, and up to 32 sprites per line. It offers backward compatibility with all previous WonderSwan titles. Its LCD screen is also larger than that of the original WonderSwan, measuring 2.9 inches (7.4 cm). The WonderSwan Color has an approximate battery life of 20 hours. The SwanCrystal improves upon the design of the WonderSwan Color through the use of a TFT LCD monitor, which has a superior response time to the FSTN monitor used in the former system. This helped to reduce motion blur in the handheld's graphics. The unit's case was also redesigned to be more durable. Its approximate battery life is 15 hours. The original WonderSwan's cartridges were solid black, while the WonderSwan Color's cartridges were clear. Games for the original WonderSwan would not display additional coloring on a WonderSwan Color and retain its original grayscale.

Several features and accessories were developed for the WonderSwan. The WonderWitch is an official software development kit aimed at amateur programmers that was released by Qute Corporation. It sold at a cost of ¥11,800 and allows for games to be developed in the C programming language. An adapter was created to connect headphones to the handheld, as the WonderSwan lacks a headphone port. A remote-controlled robot known as the WonderBorg can be operated through the unit. In addition, the handheld can be connected to a PocketStation, a memory card peripheral for the PlayStation console, through a device known as the WonderWave. The WonderSwan and its later models were also capable of connecting to the internet via a mobile phone network.

== Game library ==
A screenshot of Gunpey for the original WonderSwan. Gunpey was named for Gunpei Yokoi, developer of the system.

Koto Laboratories claims that the WonderSwan sold 10 million game cartridges in all. In developing games for the WonderSwan, Bandai leveraged the assistance of several developers. Banpresto—part-owned by Bandai at the time—added support by way of anime licenses and licensed titles, while Namco and Capcom also developed titles for the handheld. Squaresoft contributed remakes of Final Fantasy, Final Fantasy II, and Final Fantasy IV, which later also came to the Game Boy Advance. Taito contributed well-received ports such as Space Invaders and Densha de Go!. Bandai augmented these releases with games of its own, including exclusive titles in the Digimon and Gundam franchises. To compete with Tetris, Gunpei Yokoi developed a puzzle game for the system ultimately named Gunpey in his honor. A sequel known as Gunpey EX was a launch title for the WonderSwan Color. Certain games produced through the WonderWitch kit, such as Judgement Silversword, have also been noted as excellent titles.

Support for the WonderSwan has been considered underwhelming. Although some well known third-party developers supported the console, most publishers continued to exclusively support Nintendo's handhelds. The departure of Squaresoft as a developer and its return to Nintendo has been cited as a factor in the WonderSwan's diminishing sales in later years. After the discontinuation of the WonderSwan in 2003, several developers ported WonderSwan games to the Game Boy Advance.

== Reception ==
Selling 3.5 million units, the WonderSwan only picked up 8% of the marketshare in Japan and was ultimately outperformed by Nintendo's Game Boy Advance. Due to its brightly colored screen and deep game library, the Game Boy Advance ensured Nintendo would have a near-monopoly on the handheld console market in Japan until the release of the PlayStation Portable by Sony in 2004.

Retrospective feedback to the handheld praises its accomplishments but defines it as a "niche" device that appeals to only certain gamers. Writing for USgamer, Jeremy Parish considers the WonderSwan the ultimate expression of Gunpei Yokoi's design philosophy and notes its modest impact on the market, but blames Bandai for its lack of success: "While WonderSwan ultimately will be remembered as a highly localized blip in the history of handheld games, as a platform it genuinely held its own ... the system's obscurity resulted more from poor timing and Bandai's strangely meek strategy, not from any inherent flaws in the design of the machine itself". Parish also goes on to hypothesize on the lack of a WonderSwan release in North America, stating, "given how hard it was to find Neo Geo Pocket systems and games at U.S. retail, it's hard to imagine they were clamoring for yet another niche portable from Japan". Luke Plunkett from Kotaku praised the WonderSwan's challenge to Nintendo, saying that "it tried some pretty unique and interesting things, and put up a much sterner fight than most other handhelds ever managed". Retro Gamer's Kim Wild criticizes some aspects of the handheld, including its lack of a headphone and AC port, as well as its poor control scheme for left-handed individuals and inability to play multiplayer link games with the headphone adapter connected. Wild offers some praise for the handheld, however, stating "what [Bandai] managed with the WonderSwan was impressive given the competition. The low price even today makes it more than worthy of consideration".
