= Sekiryo Kaneda =

Japanese businessman (1883–1949)

- 金田 積良

2nd President of Nintendo
- In office 1929–1949
- Preceded by: Fusajiro Yamauchi
- Succeeded by: Hiroshi Yamauchi

Personal details
- Born: 1883
- Died: 1949 (aged 65–66)
- Spouse: Tei Yamauchi (m. 1905)
- Children: 2
- Relatives: Fusajiro Yamauchi (father-in-law); Hiroshi Yamauchi (grandson)
- Occupation: Entrepreneur

Sekiryo Kaneda (Japanese: 金田 積良, Hepburn: Kaneda Sekiryō; 1883 – 1949), also known as Sekiryo Yamauchi (山内 積良, Yamauchi Sekiryō), was the second president of what is now Nintendo Co., Ltd., from 1929 to 1949. He married one of the two daughters of Fusajiro Yamauchi, Tei Yamauchi, and took the Yamauchi surname. Kaneda retired in 1949 after suffering a stroke, leaving Nintendo to be run by his grandson, Hiroshi Yamauchi.

== Career ==
In 1905, Kaneda married Fusajiro Yamauchi's daughter, Tei, and based on Japanese adult adoption rules, he took the Yamauchi surname on the same day in order to inherit Nintendo. Fusajiro Yamauchi retired in 1929, making Kaneda Nintendo's second president.

When Kaneda took over Nintendo, he was in charge of Japan's largest card maker. One of his first decisions was to create a "karuta" division in charge of all educative and child-focused card games.

In 1933, he established Nintendo as a joint venture company called Yamauchi Nintendo. He additionally imposed new works methods and expanded Nintendo international market by selling cheap decks in India and by selling hanafuda decks to Japanese colonists throughout the Japanese colonial empire. Additionally, hanafuda decks are sold to Japanese migrants in the United States during this period. Indeed, hanafuda decks made by Nintendo have been found in the United States dating from 1930s.

The same year, Kaneda expanded Nintendo's headquarters by buying the nearby terrain and building a new building made of cement using his own company, Haikyô.

During World War II, Nintendo came close to bankruptcy but was saved thanks to a contract with the Japanese government on 28 November 1942 to realise a Uta-garuta deck which used nationalist texts instead of the habitual 100 poems. 15,000 decks were made by 8 December. Nintendo also sold board games with nationalist connotations during this period.

In 1947, he established a distribution company, Marufuku, that would sell new varieties of Western-style playing cards.

== Personal life ==
From his 1905 marriage to Tei Yamauchi, Kaneda had two daughters: Kimi, born in 1907, whose husband would end up inheriting Nintendo, and Taka, born in 1909, who would end up inheriting Haikyō. Kimi would end up marrying Shikanojō Inaba, a marriage from which was born Hiroshi Yamauchi.

He suffered a stroke in 1948 and retired in 1949. Near death, he quickly recruited his 21-year-old grandson, Hiroshi Yamauchi, to quit college and inherit the family business. Hiroshi Yamauchi's father, Shikanojō Inaba, had forfeited inheritance because he had abandoned his family when Yamauchi was five years old. His ashes today reside within the same building he built in 1933.

== Bibliography ==
- Firestone, Mary (2011). Nintendo: the company and its founders. Technology pioneers. Edina, Minn: ABDO Pub. Co. ISBN 978-1-61714-809-5.
- Gorges, Florent (2017). 1889-1980, des cartes à jouer aux Game & Watch. L'histoire de Nintendo / Florent Gorges; avec la collaboration d'Isao Yamazaki, Erik Voskuil, Fabrice Heilig. Isao Yamazaki, Erik Voskuil, Fabrice Heilig (Troisième édition, nouvelle édition améliorée et augmentée ed.). Châtillon: Omaké books. ISBN 978-2-919603-40-4.
- Harris, Blake J. (13 May 2014). Console Wars: Sega, Nintendo, and the Battle that Defined a Generation. Dey Street Books. ISBN 978-0-06-227671-1.
- Sheff, David (2 November 2011). Game Over: How Nintendo Conquered The World. Knopf Doubleday Publishing Group. ISBN 978-0-307-80074-9.
- Sutherland, Adam (15 January 2012). The Story of Nintendo. The Rosen Publishing Group, Inc. ISBN 978-1-4488-7043-1.
