= Ultra Machine =

Batting toy by Nintendo

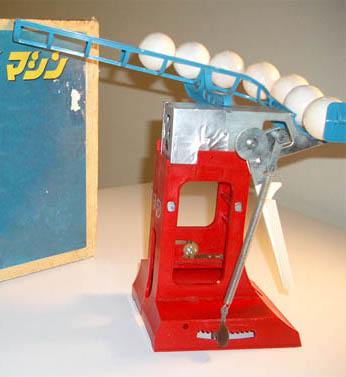
The Ultra Machine and its packaging

The Ultra Machine is a batting toy distributed by Nintendo and designed by Gunpei Yokoi in 1967.

== History ==
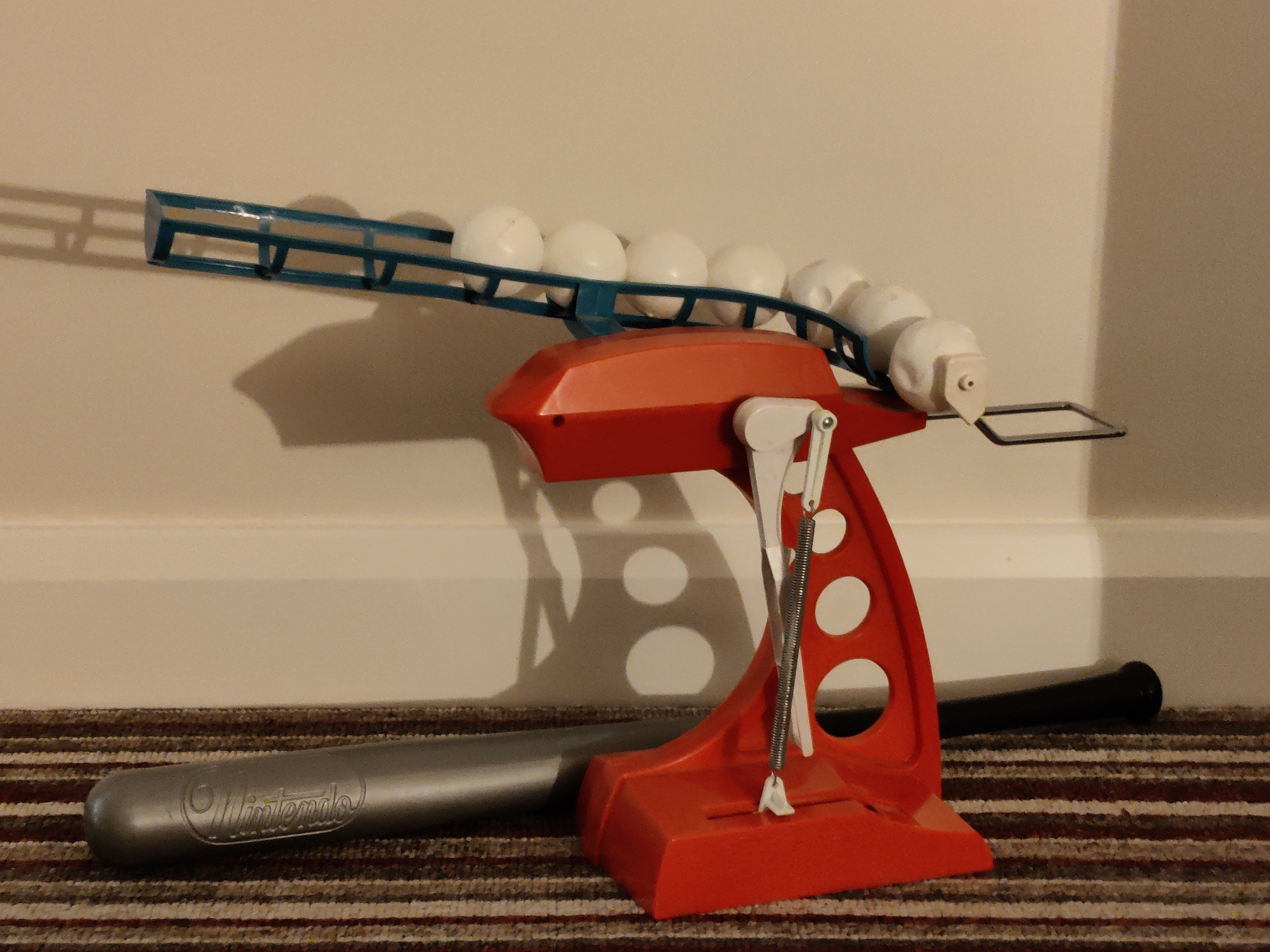
The newer Ultra Machine Deluxe with baseball bat

The toy is part of Nintendo's Ultra Toy series, which includes the Ultra Hand and the Ultra Scope. It launches soft balls that can be hit with a bat. It sold over a million units and was released elsewhere as the Slugger Mate.

Another version, the Ultra Machine Deluxe, was released in 1977.

== Appearances ==
The Ultra Machine appears in as a boss fight in WarioWare, Inc.: Mega Microgames! and WarioWare: Smooth Moves as a minigame. It is in Mario Party 5, the Animal Crossing series as a piece of furniture, and in Rusty's Real Deal Baseball. The latter features characters with Ultra Machine-shaped heads. In Splatoon 2, the Bomb Launcher, a special weapon, resembles the Ultra Machine.

== See also ==
- Ultra Hand
- List of Nintendo products
- Pitching machine
