= Reach extender =

Long stick with a grabber on the end to pick up things easily

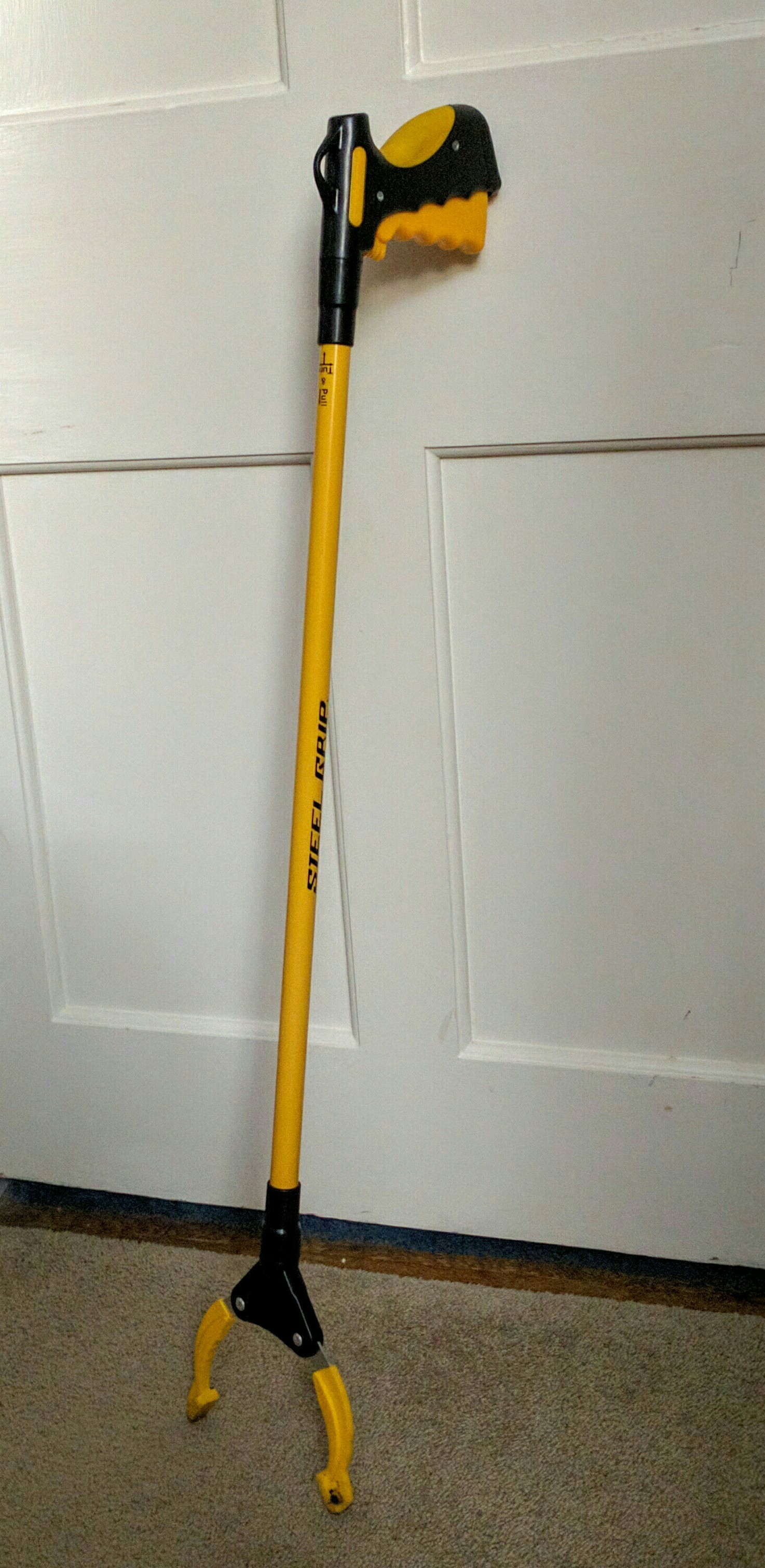
A 36 in (910 mm) reach extender with a secondary trigger and a pole that can be rotated 90 degrees

A reach extender (or reacher, grabber arm, helping hand, trash picker, picker-upper, extended gripper, long arm gripper, extended reach grabber, grabber tool, litter picker, or caliper) is a handheld mechanical tool used to increase the range of a person's reach and grasp when grabbing objects. It has applications in waste management, assistive technology, gardening and outdoor work, and in some cases as a children's toy. It is chiefly used to pick items up off the ground, but can also be used to retrieve items from high shelves. The tool is commonly sold in hardware stores.

== Description ==
A reach extender takes the form of a long metal or plastic pole, usually around 3 feet (0.91 m) in length, with a handle at one end and a pair of jaws at the other end. The tool is available in lengths ranging from 24 inches (610 mm) for wheelchair users, up to at least 16 feet (4.9 m).

The handle is equipped with a trigger that, when pulled, closes the jaws via a lever-and-spring system or mechanical cable within the pole. The jaws are open by default and spring open when the trigger is released. Some reach extenders may possess a secondary trigger which locks the jaws in position around whatever object they are holding, so the user does not need to maintain a tight grip on the handle. Gripping force can range up to 17 pounds (7.7 kg) in some models.

Other designs have jaws equipped with suction cups for holding round objects more easily, and still others have small magnets for collecting lightweight ferrous items. Some designs allow rotation of the plane in which the jaws operate relative to the trigger grip, allowing less-awkward manipulation of different objects. Variations on the basic form of a reach extender depend on what task needs to be accomplished, and significant variation is found in the length of the pole and the maximum weight the reach extender can bear.

== Usage ==
Reach extenders are used by litter collection services to aid in picking up litter off the ground without having to bend over repeatedly, which is very fatiguing. People may construct specially adapted tools for this purpose.

Reach extenders are also used to provide accessibility to people with disabilities or who are aging.

A 2009 neuroplasticity study by Cardinali et al. used reach extenders to demonstrate that the human brain quickly learns to map tools as parts of the body.

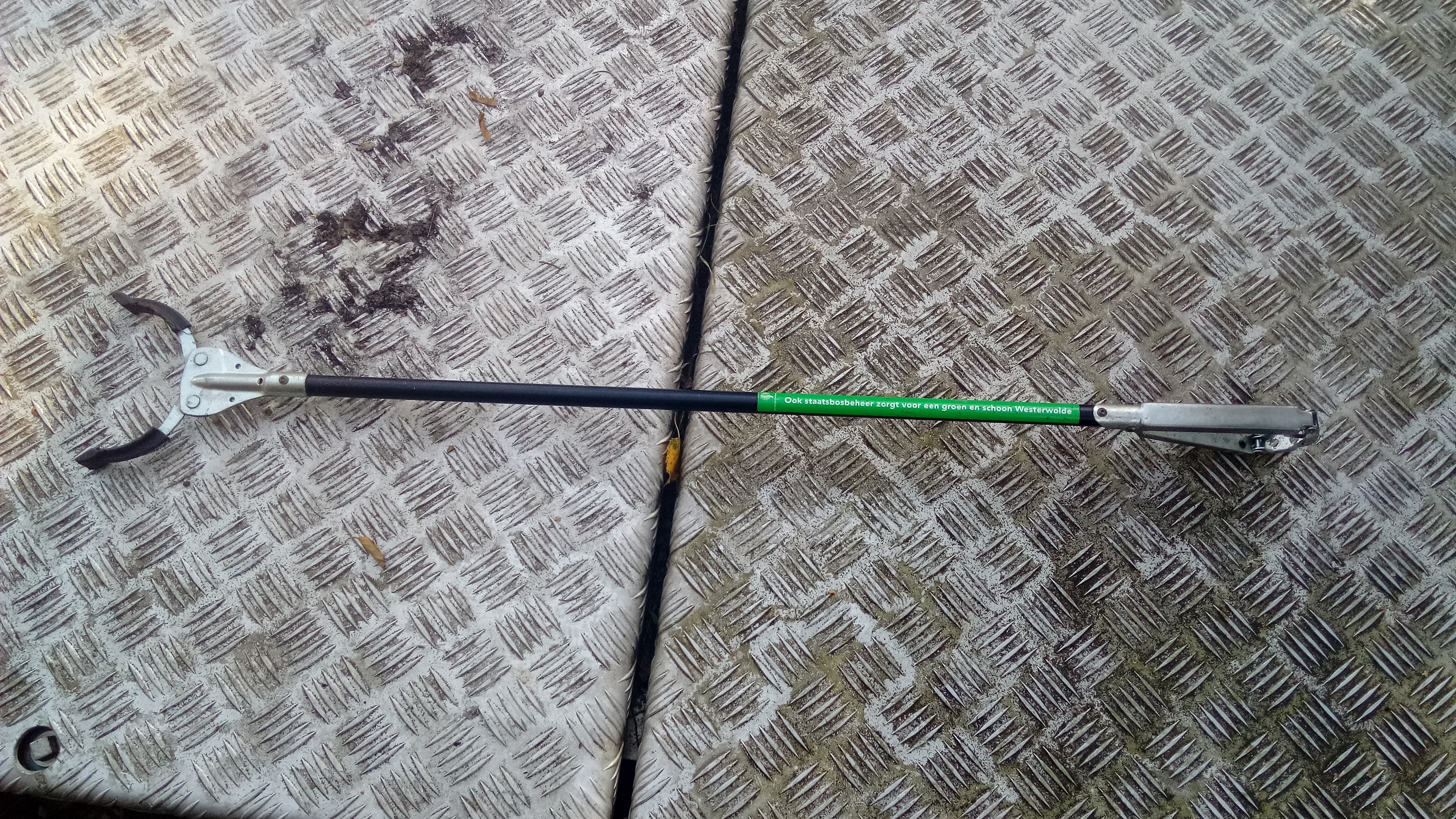
Dutch tool used for picking up litter

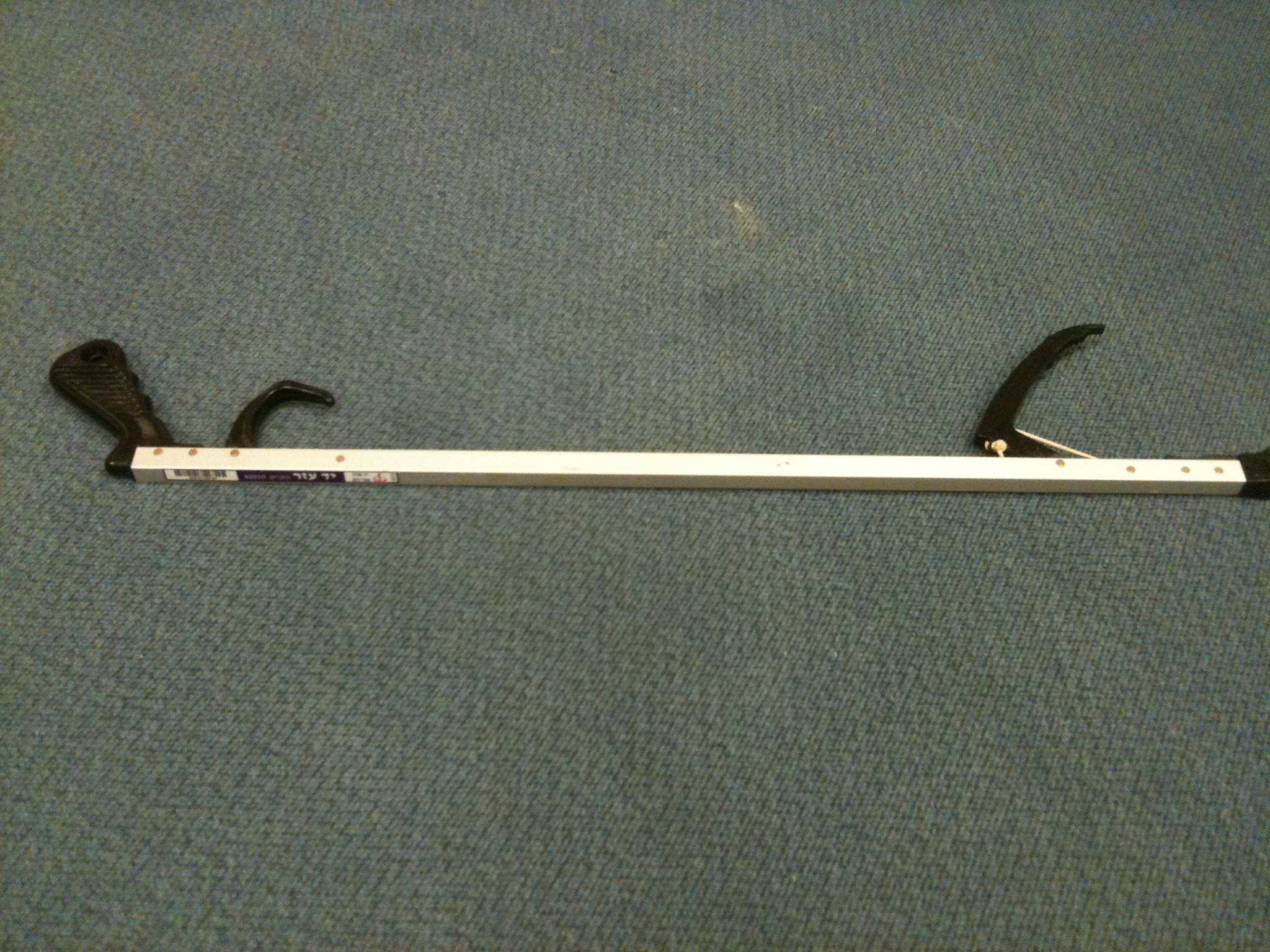
Israeli tool for accessibility

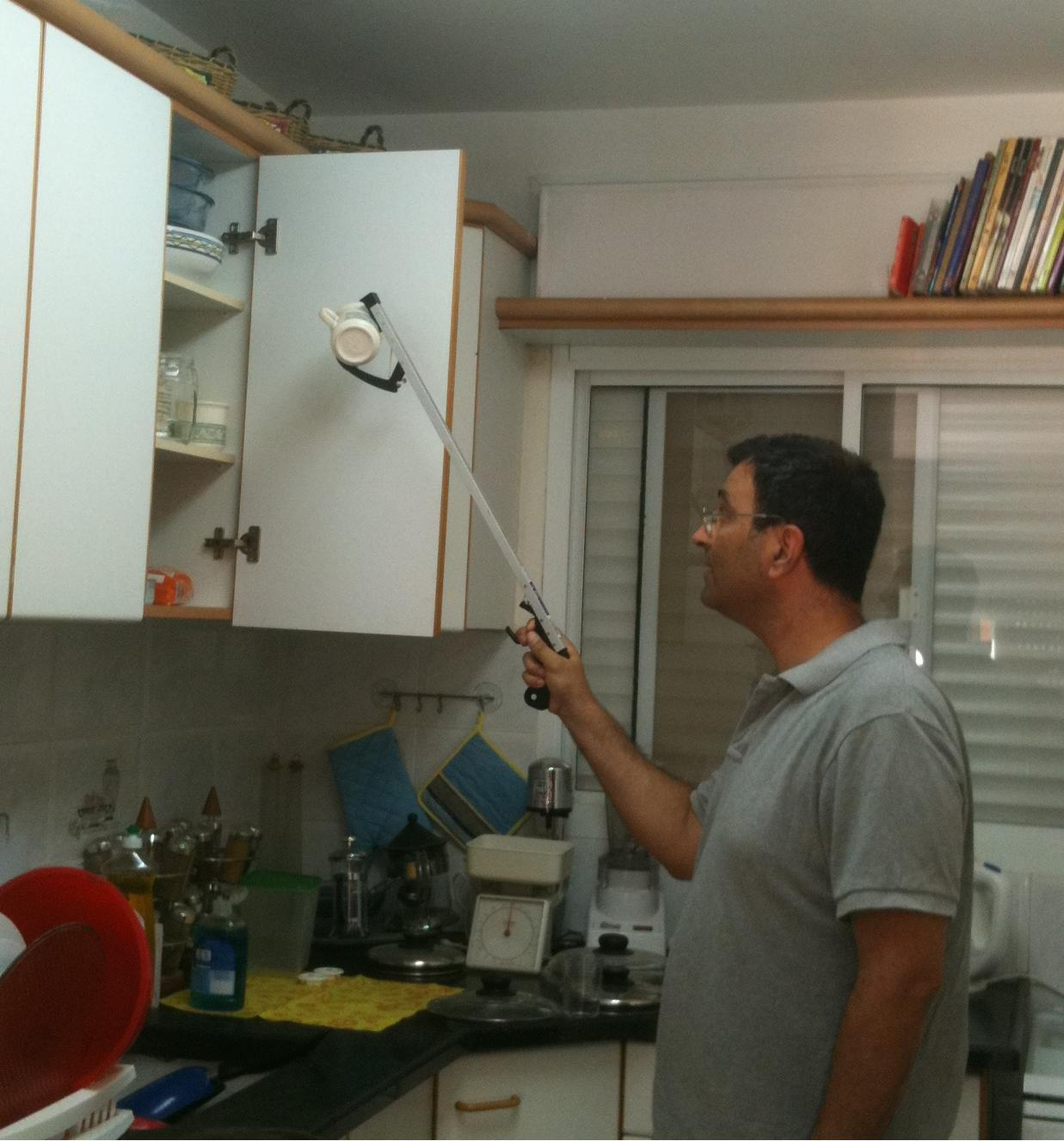
Retrieving a cup from a high shelf

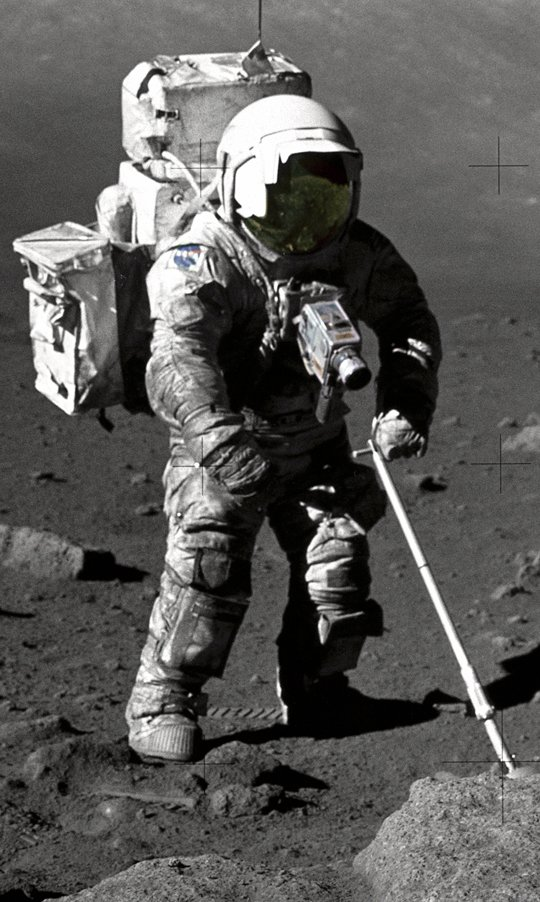
Harrison Schmitt using reach extender in Apollo 17 mission

== History ==
In 1768, United States polymath Benjamin Franklin invented the "Long Arm", a reach extender for extracting books from high shelves.

In 1887, the Combined Hook and Hanger was patented by Charles Bierman of Brooklyn in 1887. Various other versions of the reach extender were patented throughout the 19th and 20th centuries.

== See also ==
- Ultra Hand
