= Fusajiro Yamauchi =

Japanese businessman (1859–1940)

Fusajirō Yamauchi
- 山内 房治郎

1st President of Nintendo
- In office September 23, 1889 – 1929
- Preceded by: Position established
- Succeeded by: Sekiryo Kaneda

Personal details
- Born: November 22, 1859 Kyoto, Japan
- Died: January 1, 1940 (aged 80) Kyoto, Japan
- Children: 2
- Relatives: Sekiryo Kaneda (son-in-law)
- Occupation: Entrepreneur
- Known for: Founder of Nintendo

Fusajirō Yamauchi (山内 房治郎, Yamauchi Fusajirō; November 22, 1859 – January 1, 1940), originally born as Fusajirō Fukui (福井 房治郎, Fukui Fusajirō), was a Japanese entrepreneur who founded Yamauchi Nintendo, later known as Nintendo.

== Early life ==
Fusajirō Fukui was born on November 22, 1859, as the oldest son of Sōsuke Fukui, a craftsperson. Fusajirō was adopted by the Yamauchis and became the heir to his adoptive father, Naoshichi Yamauchi.

Shortly after, in 1885, Fusajirō inherited the company at the age of 17 and renamed it Haikyō.

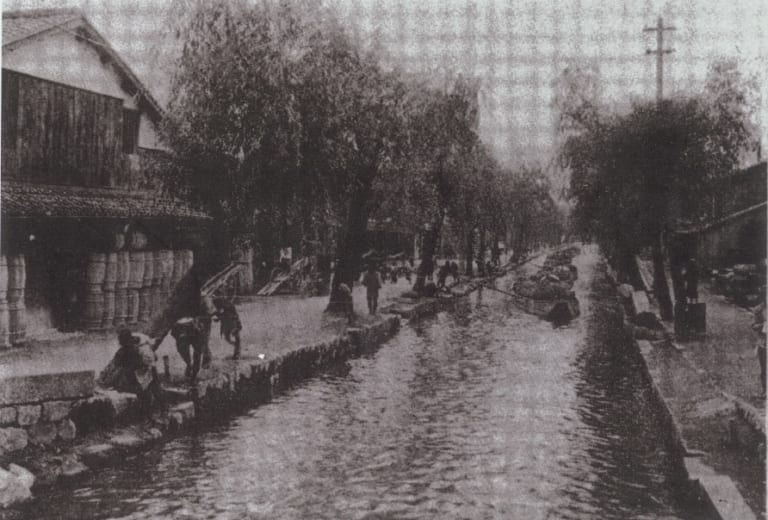
Picture of the Haikyō main store taken from the Takasegawa Main Bridge, c. 1917. Barrels of cement are visible on the left.

== Yamauchi Fusajirō Shōten or Yamauchi Nintendo ==
In the context of the Meiji Restoration, in 1885, gambling laws were relaxed in Japan, and Hanafuda cards, which were previously banned, became legal. Fusajiro, after having opened other shops selling lime in Kyoto, was inspired by both the booming business of Hanafuda and his personal taste for the game. He played it regularly and decided to use his skills as a craftsperson to open a factory building handmade Hanafuda decks.

On September 23, 1889, Fusajiro Yamauchi opened Yamauchi Fusajirō Shōten, also known as Yamauchi Nintendo (Note: Nintendo would only go from a card manufacturer to a true company/joint venture with the name Yamauchi Nintendo in 1933.) (other sources also mention the name Nintendo Koppai) at the location of an unoccupied house he had purchased. Fusajiro crafted the Hanafuda decks using mulberry bark, clay and a wood-block printing machine that he designed himself. The Hanafuda decks sold by Nintendo, known as Daitōryō (i.e., President) decks, were recognizable thanks to the illustration of Napoleon that adorned them and became highly successful in Kyoto within a few years.

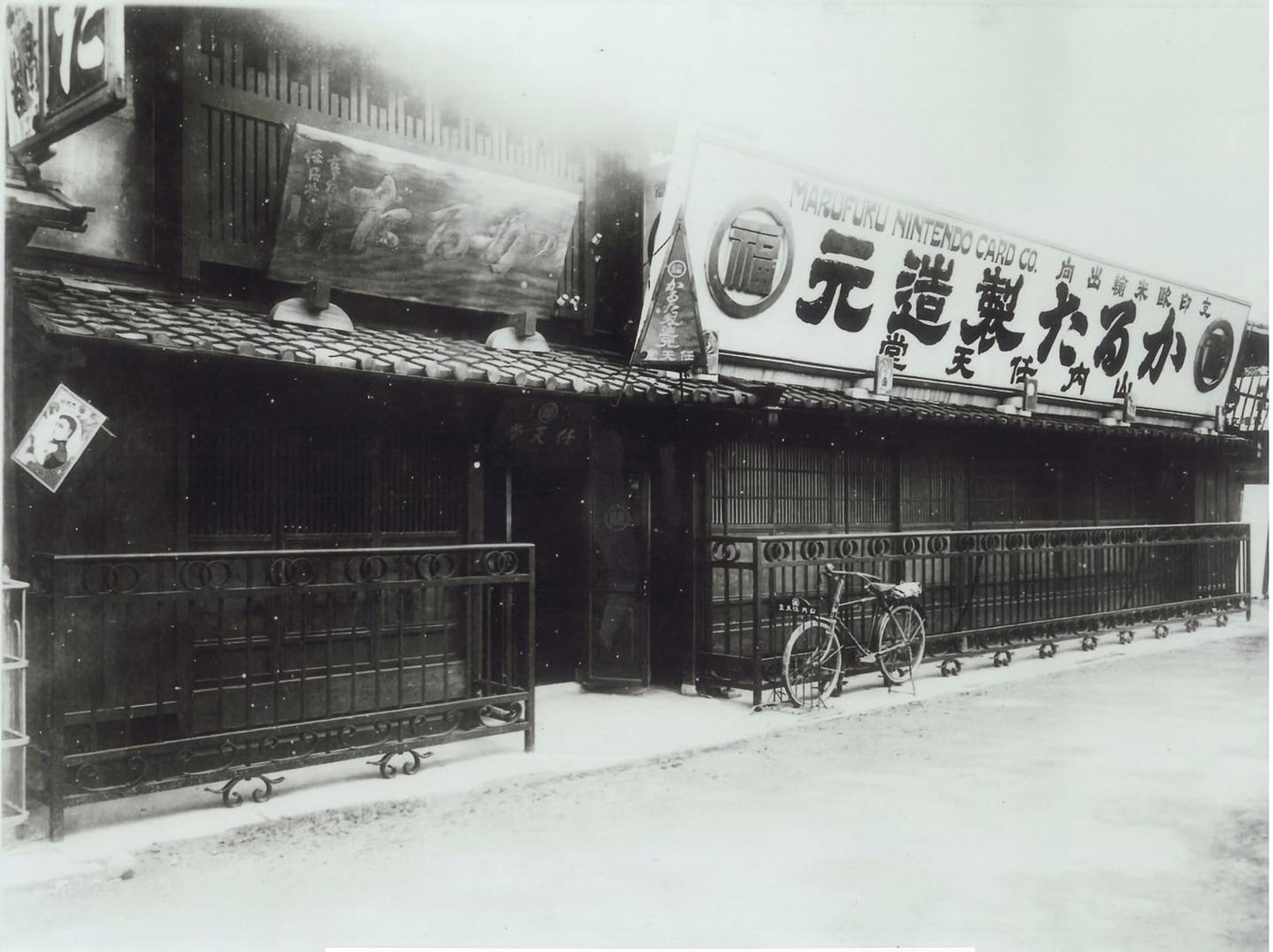
Nintendo's first headquarters in 1889

In 1890, Nintendo expands its products and starts selling Uta-garuta decks. However, it soon faced challenges in selling its Hanafuda and Uta-garuta due to competition and a shrinking market in its vicinity. Fusajiro then had the idea of using the Hanafuda cards of lesser quality that had been discarded and selling them in new decks called "Tengu", which were priced lower than the Daitōryō decks. Additionally, Fusajiro decided to target the clubhouse market. These places never used the same deck twice to prevent cheating, resulting in high deck turnover. In the end, Fusajiro managed to secure contracts with around 70 clubhouses, each using at least 50 decks per night.

=== Nintendo and trump cards ===
Just as Hanafuda cards were allowed again in 1885, so too did occidental playing cards (the Standard 52-card deck) become allowed. These western cards, called ‘Trump’ by the Japanese population, truly began to achieve success in 1886. It was by witnessing their popularity and recognizing that they were primarily purchased by the wealthy upper class due to their high prices from exportation that Fusajiro had the idea to produce his own Trump cards instead of importing them.

Although 1907 is most commonly cited as the date when Nintendo started selling their own manufactured western playing cards, a 1974 presentation flyer by the company cites 1911 as the year when trump decks started being made. Moreover, Nintendo's website lists 1902 as the year "Mr. Yamauchi started manufacturing the first western-style playing cards in Japan." According to author Florent Gorges, the date 1902 comes from the website of Watada Insatsujo (Watada Printings), a printing company that still works with Nintendo today and has done so since 1899. Indeed, on their website, it is written (translated): "1902: Beginning of the prints of "Trump" playing cards for Nintendo Koppai."

Nintendo playing cards

The decision by Fusajiro to start selling western playing cards made in Japan happened at a fortuitous time for Nintendo. In the same year, the imperial government implemented a new tax on mah-jong and cards producers called the "Koppai Zei" or "Karuta Zei". This tax of 20 sen, created to prepare for future armed conflicts (the sen is a subdivision of the Japanese yen, which became obsolete in 1954), doubled the price of most Hanafuda decks. These decks were also sold for around 20 sen, leading to more than half of the main producers of Hanafuda cards closing their shops. The western cards served as a lifeline for Nintendo, which was the only company selling these made-in-Japan western cards at the time.

=== Distribution across Japan ===
Limited to the Osaka and Kyoto region, Fusajiro had the idea to create a distribution network to expand Nintendo's operations throughout all of Japan. This was something unheard of at the time, as only drugs and tobacco possessed that kind of distribution.

And so, in 1907, Fusajiro expanded Nintendo's operations by making a deal with Nihon Senbai (Note: Japan Tobacco and Salt Co. is also cited but it was formed only in 1949.) (now Japan Tobacco) to sell Nintendo cards in cigarette shops throughout all of Japan. By the time of Fusajiro's retirement in 1929, Nintendo had become the largest playing-card company in Japan.

== Personal details ==
Without a son, Fusajiro decided to arrange a marriage in 1905 between Sekiryō Kaneda, an employee who started working at Nintendo at the beginning of the decade, and one of his two daughters, Tei. Over the next decades, Sekiryō would lead both the Nintendo and Haikyō companies alongside his father-in-law until 1929, the year in which Fusajiro retired, and Sekiryō Yamauchi inherited both companies.

== Bibliography ==
- Gorges, Florent (2017). 1889-1980, des cartes à jouer aux Game & Watch. L'histoire de Nintendo / Florent Gorges; avec la collaboration d'Isao Yamazaki, Erik Voskuil, Fabrice Heilig. Isao Yamazaki, Erik Voskuil, Fabrice Heilig (Troisième édition, nouvelle édition améliorée et augmentée ed.). Châtillon: Omaké books. ISBN 978-2-919603-40-4.
- Sheff, David (1993). Game Over: Press Start to Continue – How Nintendo Conquered the World (1999 ed.). United States of America: Cyberactive Media Group Inc/Game pr. ISBN 9780966961706.
