= Love Tester =

Electronic toy made by Nintendo in 1969

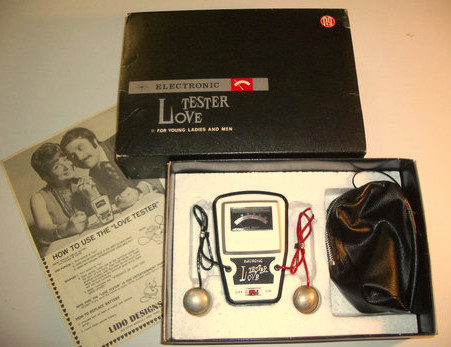
- Invented by: Gunpei Yokoi
- Company: Nintendo
- Country: Japan
- Availability: 1969–present

The Love Tester (ラブテスター, Rabu Tesutā) is a novelty toy made by Nintendo in 1969. Designed "for young ladies and men", the device purports to determine how much two people love each other. To operate the device, both users grab one of the connected spherical metal sensors with one hand and hold each other's hands with the other; the meter on the device displays their "love score" on a scale between 1 and 100.

The Love Tester was designed by Gunpei Yokoi (eventual creator of the Game & Watch series and the original Game Boy), who said that he "loved explaining that the meter gave better results when people kissed the girl". It was the first product by Nintendo to use real electronic components. It was also one of the few products by Nintendo during the 1960s that were sold outside Japan. The device was marketed in Western markets as a "Love/Lie Detector". It was also released as part of a "Mini Game Series", and other versions of the device were packaged differently and contained English instructions. It was advertised heavily on Japanese television, with commercials that have gained a cult following. It originally sold for ¥1,800.

"The Love Tester came from me wondering if I could somehow use this to get girls to hold my hand. ... I wound up holding hands with quite a few girls thanks to it. Of course, somewhere along the line I started to feel like I wanted to do more than just hold hands. [laughs]"

— Gunpei Yokoi

In July 2010, the Love Tester was re-released in Japan by Tenyo, who previously worked with Nintendo on the Master of Illusion series of games. It features the original packaging, and was officially endorsed by Nintendo alongside another incarnation produced by Taito. The Love Tester is considered one of the most sought-after products from Nintendo's earlier years and is considered one of the most unusual products created by Nintendo.

== See also ==
- Love tester machine
- List of Nintendo products
