= Game Boy Advance Wireless Adapter =

Accessory for the Game Boy Advance

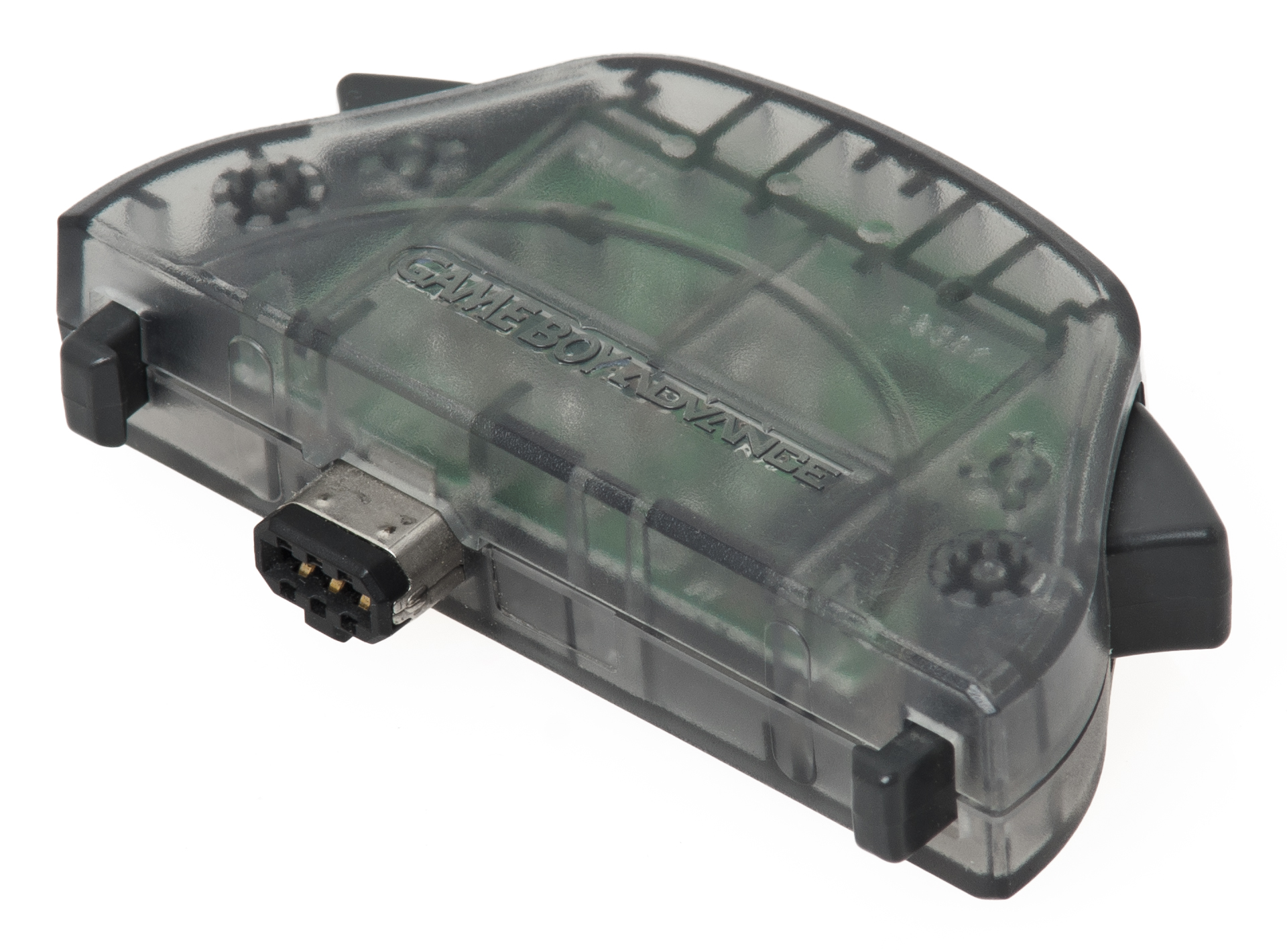
- The Game Boy Advance wireless adapter
- Also known as: AGB-015 (GBA Wireless Adapter); OXY-004 (GBM Wireless Adapter)
- Developer: Nintendo; Motorola
- Manufacturer: Nintendo
- Type: Wireless communication device
- Generation: Sixth
- Released: JP: January 29, 2004; NA: September 7, 2004; EU: October 1, 2004
- Introductory price: ¥2,000; US$20
- Related: Game Link Cable

The Game Boy Advance Wireless Adapter (Note: Japanese: ゲームボーイアドバンス専用ワイヤレスアダプタ, Hepburn: Gēmu Bōi Adobansu Sen'yō Waiyaresu Adaputa) is a wireless adapter accessory for the Game Boy Advance, released by Nintendo in 2004. It provides similar functionality to the Game Boy Advance Game Link Cable, but is only compatible with 46 games, all released between 2004 and 2006. The accessory was initially packaged with the Pokémon FireRed and LeafGreen games in 2004, before later being made available for separate sale. A separate model, the Game Boy Micro Wireless Adapter, was released for the Game Boy Micro in 2006.

== Overview ==
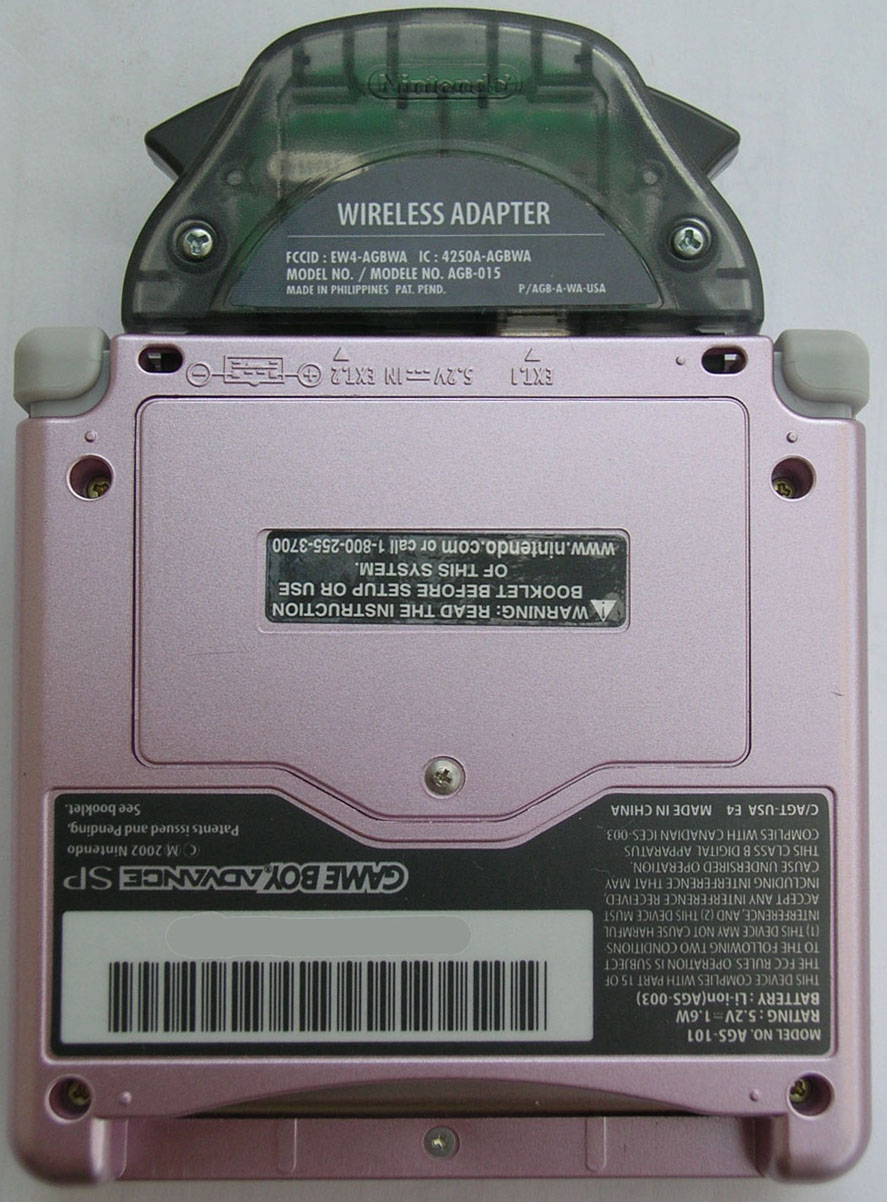
A Pearl Pink Game Boy Advance SP with the Wireless Adapter attached

The Wireless Adapter allows for multiplayer gaming with the Game Boy Advance, and attaches via the External Extension Connector. The range of this adapter is short compared to the built-in wireless function of the Nintendo DS; Nintendo recommends players stay within 10 ft. (about 3m) of each other for best results. Players can connect to games which support single-cartridge multiplayer by using the device's search function, activated by turning the system on with no game pak inserted or by holding Start and Select as the system boots up. While in search mode, the device will continually search for compatible games being played nearby, allowing players to select and join a host game.

The Wireless Adapter is physically compatible with the Game Boy Advance, the Game Boy Advance SP, and the Game Boy Player accessory for the GameCube. However, due to a different style link cable port, the Wireless Adapter will not attach to a Game Boy Micro. A separate model of Wireless Adapter was released for the Game Boy Micro, which differs only in form factor and is otherwise identical to and compatible with the original model.

The Wireless Adapter is not backwards compatible with older model Game Boy games, and cannot be used as a general substitute for a Game Link Cable; it will only work with games that have been programmed to support the accessory. Similarly, the adapter cannot connect with the Nintendo DS, since the DS does not support multiplayer mode in Game Boy Advance games.

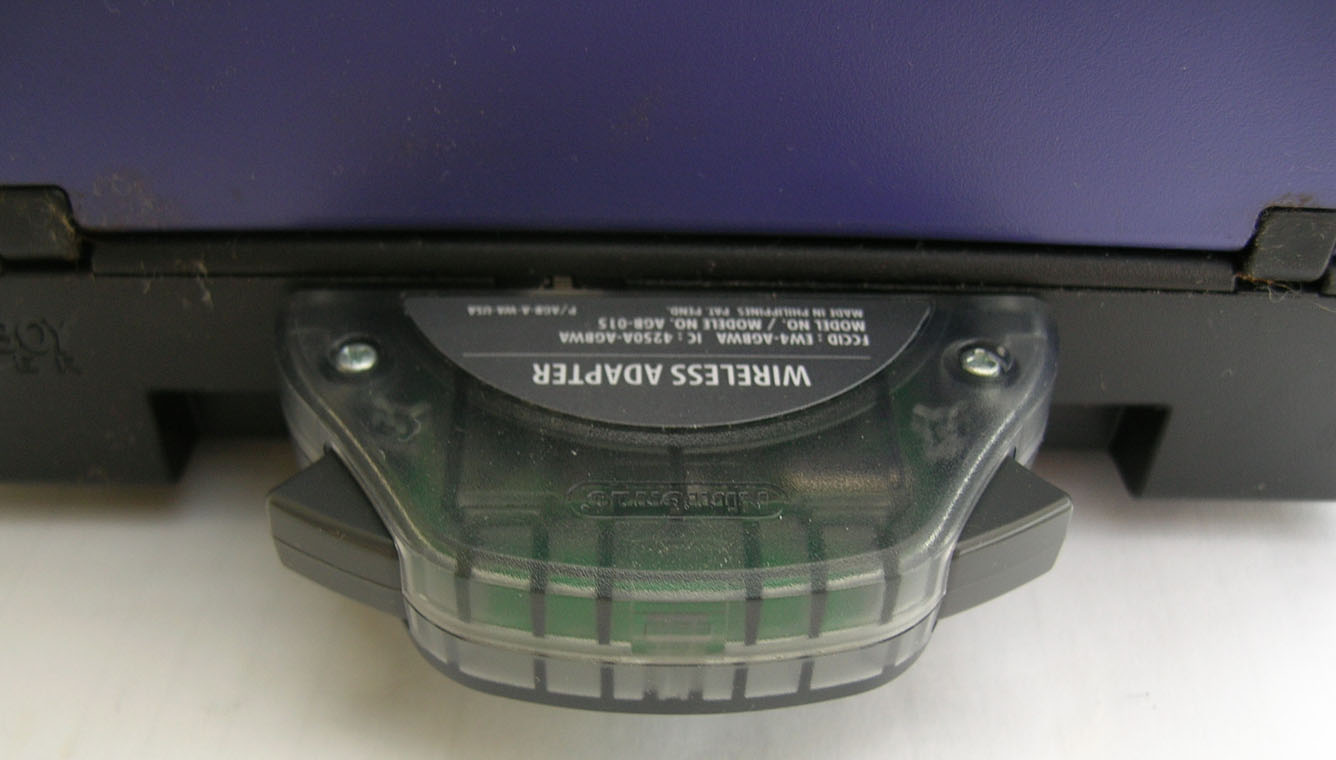
The Wireless Adapter plugged in to a Game Boy Player

One of the Wireless Adapter's most publicized uses is in Pokémon FireRed, LeafGreen, and Emerald. While all three still support the Game Boy Advance Game Link Cable (and must use a link cable to link with Ruby and Sapphire), up to 30 Wireless Adapter-connected players can convene in a virtual in-game lobby called the "Union Room" for battles and trades. The Wireless Adapter is also used in these games to download special data via the Mystery Gift option at various Pokémon-related events. Outside of the Pokémon series, the Wireless Adapter supports up to five players in most games. All games in the Classic NES Series line with multiplayer functionality offer support for single-cartridge wireless multiplayer.

== Compatible games ==
Only 46 Game Boy Advance games support the Wireless Adapter, including 15 entries in the Classic NES Series/Famicom Mini line. Compatible games are identified by a "Wireless Adapter Compatible" label on the box. Mario Golf: Advance Tour and the Classic NES Series games are missing this label, despite being compatible, due to releasing before the accessory.

- bit Generations: Boundish (Japan only)
- bit Generations: Coloris (Japan only)
- bit Generations: Dialhex (Japan only)
- bit Generations: DigiDrive (Japan only)
- Boktai 2: Solar Boy Django
- The Chronicles of Narnia: The Lion, the Witch and the Wardrobe
- Classic NES Series: Donkey Kong
- Classic NES Series: Dr. Mario
- Classic NES Series: Ice Climber
- Classic NES Series: Pac-Man
- Classic NES Series: Super Mario Bros.
- Classic NES Series: Xevious
- Digimon Racing
- Dragon Ball Z: Buu's Fury
- Famicom Mini: Balloon Fight (Japan only)
- Famicom Mini: Clu Clu Land (Japan only)
- Famicom Mini: Dig Dug (Japan only)
- Famicom Mini: Makaimura (Japan only)
- Famicom Mini: Mappy (Japan only)
- Famicom Mini: Mario Bros. (Japan only)
- Famicom Mini: SD Gundam World: Gachapon Senshi - Scramble Wars (Japan only)
- Famicom Mini: TwinBee (Japan only)
- Famicom Mini: Wrecking Crew (Japan only)
- Ganbare! Dodge Fighters (Japan only)
- Hamtaro: Ham-Ham Games
- Keroro Gunsou Taiketsu! Gekisō Keronprix Daisakusen de Arimasu!! (Japan only)
- Kiss x Kiss: Seirei Gakuen (Japan only)
- Konjiki no Gash Bell!! The Card Battle for GBA (Japan only)
- The Lord of the Rings: The Third Age
- Mario Golf: Advance Tour
- Mario Tennis: Power Tour
- Mega Man Battle Network 5 Team Colonel
- Mega Man Battle Network 5 Team ProtoMan
- Mega Man Battle Network 6: Cybeast Falzar
- Mega Man Battle Network 6: Cybeast Gregar
- Momotaro Dentetsu G: Gold Deck o Tsukure! (Japan only)
- Nonono Puzzle Chalien (Japan only)
- Pokémon Emerald
- Pokémon FireRed
- Pokémon LeafGreen
- Sennen Kazoku (Japan only)
- Shrek SuperSlam
- Shin Bokura no Taiyō: Gyakushū no Sabata (Japan only)
- Wagamama Fairy Mirmo de Pon! Nazo no Kagi to Shinjitsu no Tobira (Japan only)
- Wagamama Fairy Mirmo de Pon! Dokidoki Memorial Panic (Japan only)
- Vattroller X (Japan only)

== Development and release ==
The Game Boy Advance Wireless Adapter was announced during Nintendo's press conference at the 2003 Tokyo Game Show. The device was developed in collaboration with Motorola, and features a 32-bit RISC baseband processor and 2.4Ghz RF transceiver that operate using TDMA protocols. Development on the Wireless Adapter was led by Nintendo hardware developer Masato Kuwahara, who was inspired to design the device after playing games of Diablo with other Nintendo employees over PC LAN. Kuwahara initially created a crude prototype of the device by connecting a Game Link Cable to a mobile phone's wireless module. Due to difficulties implementing Bluetooth into the device, the development team instead engineered their own method of wireless communication. The team also explored having the device connect to games for the GameCube, such as The Legend of Zelda: Four Swords Adventures, but this was not implemented due to time constraints; a similar method of wireless handheld-to-console communication based on these experiments would later be implemented into the Nintendo DS.

The Wireless Adapter was initially available only as a pack-in with copies of Pokémon FireRed and LeafGreen, released worldwide in 2004. In Japan, Nintendo began selling a standalone version of the Wireless Adapter the following July, and once again packaged it with Pokemon Emerald the following September. In 2006, Nintendo began selling the standalone version in the West through their website, along with a version formatted for use with the Game Boy Micro.

In March 2004, Nintendo launched JoySpot in Japan, a networking service operated through wireless hotspots placed in participating retailers. Players could use the Wireless Adapter with compatible games to access JoySpot locations, through which they could receive news updates and compete with other local players in challenges. The JoySpot service was later discontinued on April 30, 2005. The concept would later be revisited with similar retailer hotspots for the Nintendo DS and Nintendo 3DS.

== Reception ==
Reviewers praised the Wireless Adapter's implementation in several games, most prominently the Pokémon series. Ed Shih of Nintendo World Report appreciated the freedom offered by the adapter, as opposed to being tethered by the Game Link Cable's short length, but lamented its lack of backwards compatibility with older games. Craig Harris of IGN felt that Pokémon Emerald not packaging the adapter detracted from the overall value of the game in comparison to FireRed and LeafGreen. In contrast, John Ricciardi of Electronic Gaming Monthly felt Emerald was extremely similar to its predecessors, Pokémon Ruby and Sapphire, and did not believe its added Wireless Adapter functionality justified a purchase for owners of the previous games. Reviewers were disappointed by the lack of adapter support in games like Mario Party Advance and Racing Gears Advance. David Rudden of CNET gave the Wireless Adapter a 5.7/10 review, believing that while the adapter worked well, the lack of support made it more difficult to justify a purchase. Rudden also noted that it was sometimes not obvious how to make the systems connect with one other. In a retrospective, Dom Peppiatt of Retro Gamer observed that outside of its use in FireRed and LeafGreen, the Wireless Adapter had been largely overlooked by developers. James Plafke of The Mary Sue similarly criticized the adapter for its large size and lack of support.
