= Wireless game adapter =

Device that enables multiplayer access

A Wireless game adapter is a device that, once connected to a video game console or handheld, enables internet and\or multiplayer access.

== Consoles ==
=== Xbox 360 ===
The Wireless Network Adapter for the Xbox 360 is a device that is plugged into the system's rear USB port, allowing for access to the internet via a wireless router.

=== Wii ===
While the Wii has built-in wireless capabilities, it is not compatible with every wireless router. For this reason Nintendo released the Nintendo Wi-Fi USB Connector peripheral that a Wii can connect wirelessly to via an internet enabled computer, wireless or otherwise.

== Handhelds ==
=== Game Boy Color/Game Boy Advance ===
The Mobile Adapter GB, was a short-lived peripheral that allowed the handheld Game Boy Color and Game Boy Advance consoles to connect to a mobile phone, utilizing its cellular network for online interactions via the Mobile System GB service. Following delays, the device and service launched in Japan on 27 January 2001. Together, they enabled online functionality for 22 games, most notably Pokémon Crystal and Mobile Golf. Nintendo ultimately chose not to release the adapter outside Japan, citing international wireless incompatibilities and market differences. Its high costs and limited game compatibility hindered widespread adoption, with only 80,000 units sold in its first year. The Mobile System GB service was discontinued on 18 December 2002.

=== Game Boy Advance ===
The Game Boy Advance and its two redesigns, the Game Boy Advance SP and the Game Boy Micro all had wireless adapters that were meant to replace the link cable used for local multiplayer. It is only compatible with 46 games.

=== Nintendo DS ===
Much like the Wii, the Nintendo DS has built-in wireless capabilities and is similarly not compatible with all wireless routers. Another hindrance is that the DS does not support certain levels of wi-fi encryption (e.g. WPA), thus necessitating the Nintendo Wi-Fi USB Connector.
