= Game Boy Player =

GameCube accessory

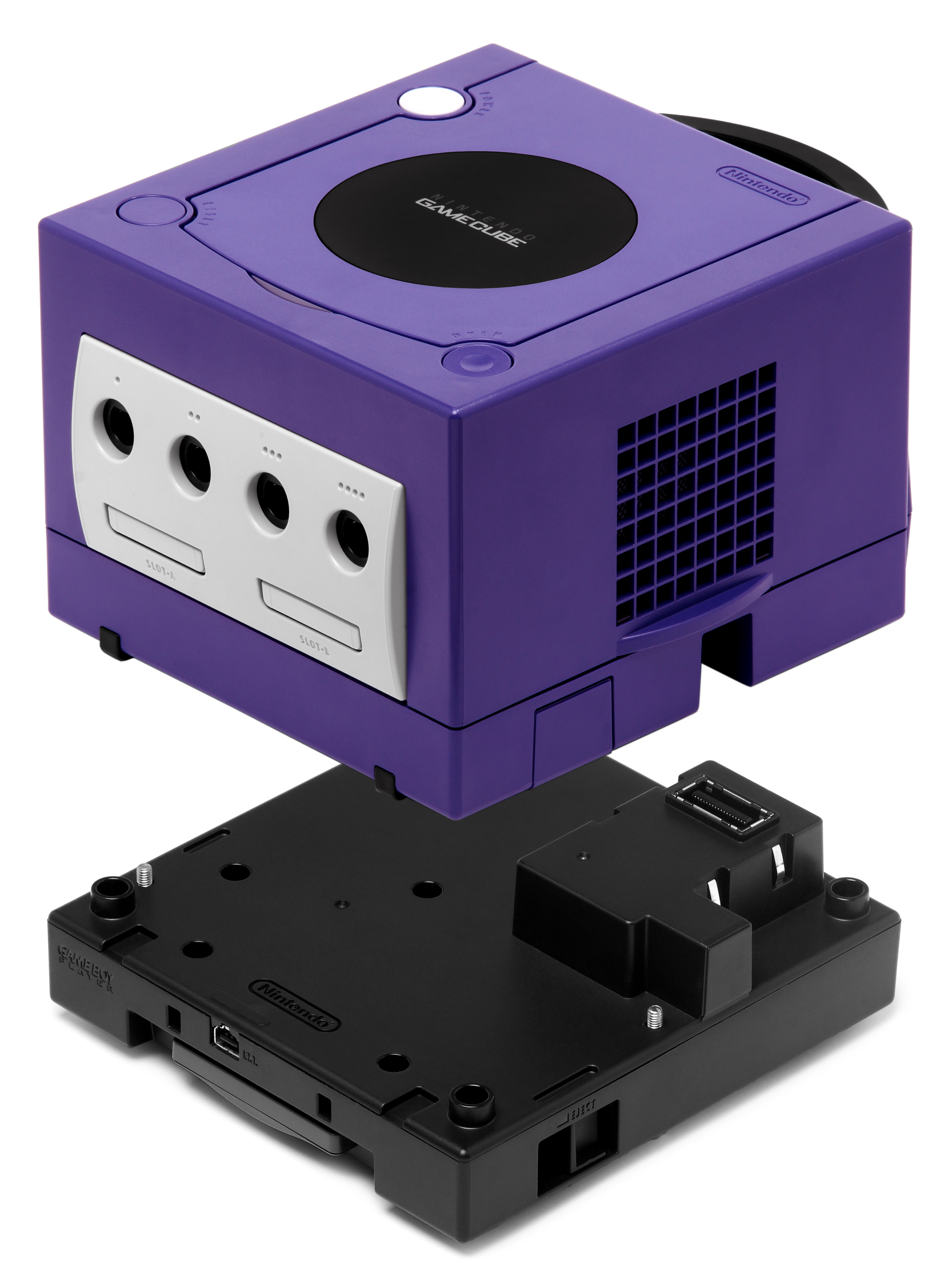
- Game Boy Player under a GameCube
- Also known as: DOL-017
- Manufacturer: Nintendo
- Product family: GameCube
- Type: Video game console add-on
- Generation: Sixth
- Released: JP: March 21, 2003; EU: June 20, 2003; NA: June 24, 2003
- Media: Game Boy Game Pak
- Predecessor: Super Game Boy

The Game Boy Player (Note: Japanese: ゲームボーイプレーヤー, Hepburn: Gēmu Bōi Purēyā) is a GameCube peripheral developed by Nintendo. It allows Game Boy Advance (GBA) cartridges, as well as Game Boy and Game Boy Color (GBC) cartridges through backwards compatibility, to be played on a television. Rather than emulating a GBA system, the Game Boy Player uses physical hardware nearly identical to that of a GBA. The peripheral received mainly positive reviews from critics.

== Design and features ==
The Game Boy Player was released in Indigo, Black, Spice, and Platinum colors in Japan; Black in North America and Europe and Black and Indigo in Australia. A special Game Boy Player for the Panasonic Q (SH-GB10-H) was released because the Q's legs are oriented differently from the original GameCube's. The accessory connects to the high speed parallel port at the bottom of the GameCube and is affixed to the system with screws. An eject button on the right side of the unit allows for the easy removal of inserted Game Paks.

A boot disc is required to start the Game Boy Player. While the Game Boy Player is region free, meaning the units will function on any GameCube system and play cartridges of any region, the boot discs are region locked and must match the region of the GameCube system.

Pressing the Z button on the GameCube controller brings up an internal settings menu. Available options include applying a motion blur effect to reduce flicker in certain games, adjusting the size of the gameplay window, switching between different controller mappings, and choosing between twenty different patterned borders around the gameplay window. The borders and other enhancements applied when playing Game Boy games on the Super Game Boy, a similar peripheral for the Super Nintendo Entertainment System (SNES), are not accessible. Players can also set a timer for up to sixty minutes, or stop the current Game Boy game to allow them to safely switch cartridges without having to turn the GameCube off.

== Controllers ==
The Game Boy Player allows for control either through a GameCube controller or a Game Boy Advance or Game Boy Advance SP hooked up with a GameCube–Game Boy Advance link cable. When using a GBA, the buttons are identical, but due to the GameCube controller's different layout, there are two different mappings players can choose from: One uses standard button placement, with X and Y also functioning as the Game Boy's Select button, while the other maps the Game Boy's shoulder buttons to X and Y and moves Select to the GameCube triggers. All connected controllers are treated as the same player and can control the game simultaneously.

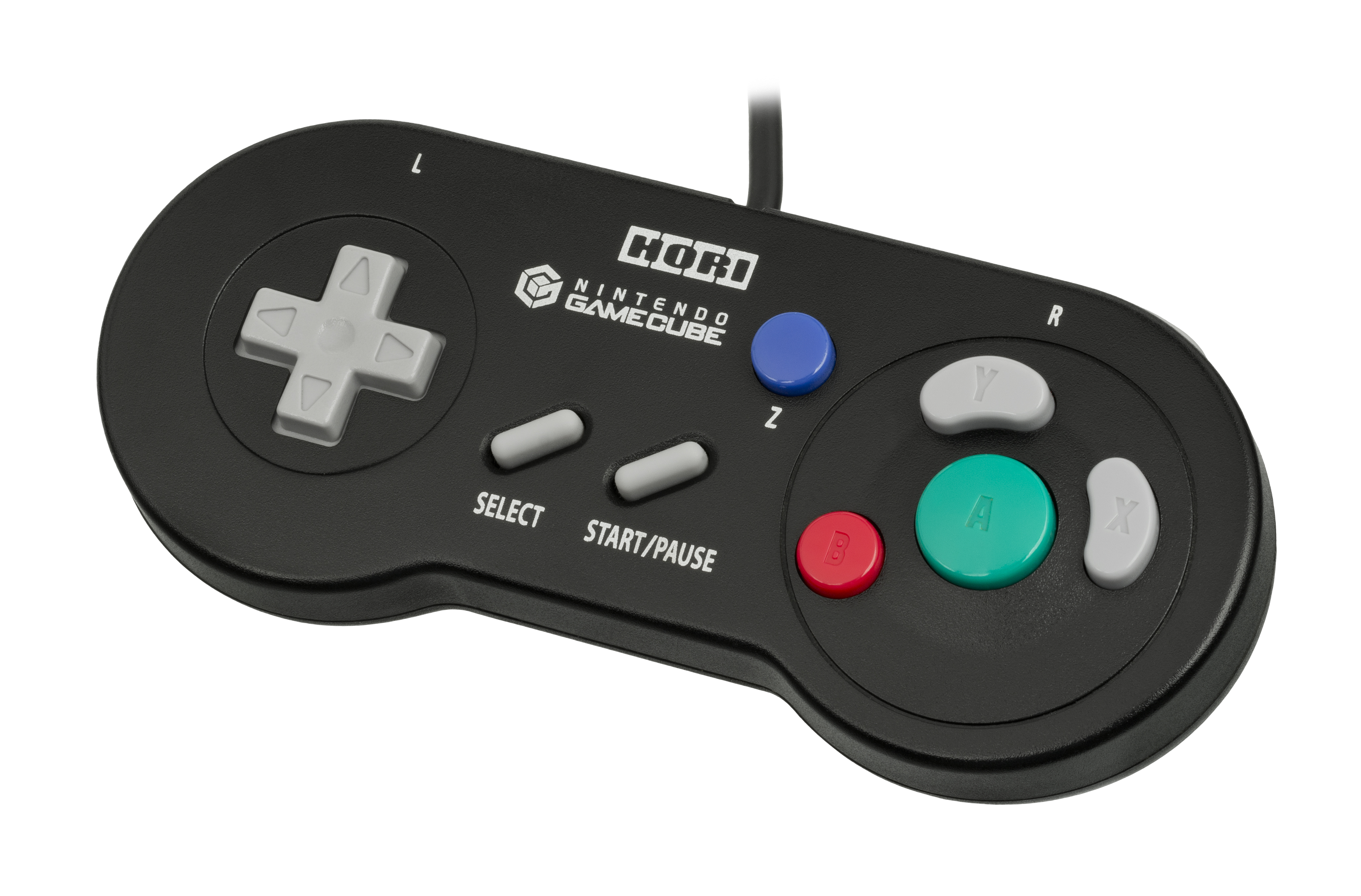
Hori manufactured a controller similar to the Super Famicom/Super NES for use with the Game Boy Player, whilst feeling like a Super Game Boy.

Japanese hardware manufacturer Hori created a special digital-only controller designed for use with the Game Boy Player. Released only in Japan, the design of the controller is similar to the design of the SNES controller, but with the GameCube's face button layout. In addition, there is a Select button on the controller mapped to the Y button internally.

== Compatibility ==
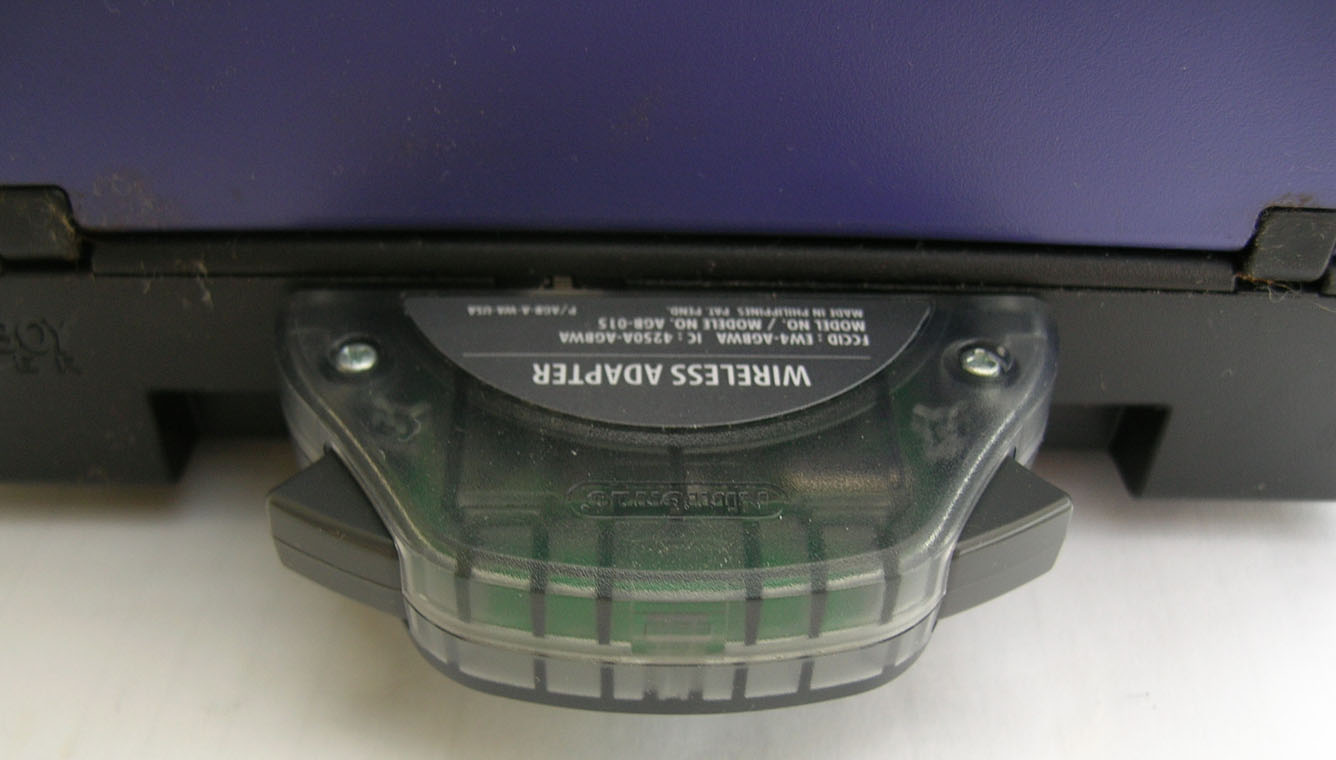
The Wireless Adapter plugged in to a Game Boy Player

Like the Game Boy Advance, the Game Boy Player is compatible with most games for the Game Boy, GBC, and GBA. Game Boy games can be played using the same selectable color palettes as on the GBC, GBA and GBA SP. Players can connect to Game Boy accessories using the extension port on the Game Boy Player. Most accessories are supported, including the Game Link Cable, Wireless Adapter, and e-Reader. Plugging a GameCube–Game Boy Advance link cable into a GameCube controller port will allow a GBA or GBA SP to be used as a controller; the cable can also be used to connect the Game Boy Player's link cable port to a second GameCube, allowing it to be used for a compatible GameCube game.

Certain GBA games include rumble features activated when played with a GameCube controller on the Game Boy Player. These games include Drill Dozer, Mario & Luigi: Superstar Saga, Pokémon Pinball: Ruby & Sapphire, Shikakui Atama wo Marukusuru Advance: Kokugo Sansu Rika Shakai, Shikakui Atama wo Marukusuru Advance: Kanji Keisan, and Super Mario Advance 4: Super Mario Bros. 3. The unlicensed GBA game Goodboy Galaxy (2023) also includes this feature.

=== Compatibility issues ===
Not all Game Boy cartridges are fully compatible with the Game Boy Player, with some games unable to be played or use certain features due to the console's non-portable format, software limitations, or other reasons.

Some games are technically compatible, but certain features cannot be easily utilized due to their use of non-standard cartridges. Games that use Motion sensors (such as Kirby Tilt 'n' Tumble and WarioWare: Twisted!) are compatible with the Game Boy Player, but require tilting the whole GameCube to control, due to the motion sensor being integrated into the Game Pak. Similarly, GBC games with built-in rumble features, such as Pokémon Pinball, will only output the rumble through the Game Pak itself, not the GameCube controller. Unofficial cheat devices, such as the Action Replay or Gameshark, will not physically fit in the cartridge slot.

Like the GBA, the lack of an infrared port on the Game Boy Player prevents GBC games from using infrared features. As a result, the GBC game Chee-Chai Alien will not start due to requiring the infrared port for gameplay.

All Game Boy Advance Video cartridges, which feature viewable films and television episodes, cannot be played on Game Boy Player as an anti-piracy measure, displaying an error message when the player attempts to do so. Another GBC game, Pocket Music, will not function on Game Boy Player due to being incompatible with all GBA models; a separate GBA version was released.

== Reception ==
Reception of the Game Boy Player was generally positive — many review sites cited how Nintendo effectively increased the GameCube's library by hundreds of games with the Game Boy Player, something that some reviewers praised and others mocked as a cheap ploy.

IGN mentioned that the filtering that the Game Boy Player uses (to relieve strobe effect on games using a flicker trick to make sprites seem transparent) "muddies" some of the graphics.

== Advance Game Port ==
In 2003, Datel released the Advance Game Port, an unofficial alternative to the Game Boy Player. The accessory is a dongle that connects to the second memory card slot on the GameCube and requires an included boot disc for use. Later models have code generators for built in Action Replay cheat devices. However, the Advance Game Port does not support Game Boy or GBC cartridges, and suffers from audio and video issues in many games due to poor software emulation.

The difference in form factor meant the Advance Game Port was compatible with the GameCube's 2006 successor, the Wii, whereas the Game Boy Player could not physically connect to the system. A Wii firmware update in 2007 later rendered all of Datel's unlicensed GameCube discs incompatible, including the Advance Game Port boot disc.

== See also ==
- Visteon Dockable Entertainment
