= Afterburner (disambiguation) =

An afterburner is an addition to a jet engine to increase thrust.

Afterburner may also refer to:

== Media and entertainment ==
- After Burner, a 1987 flight combat video game
- Afterburner (Transformers), several fictional characters
- Afterburner (ZZ Top album), 1985
- Afterburner (Dance Gavin Dance album), 2020
- Afterburner (modification kit), an aftermarket frontlighting kit for Game Boy Advance
- Afterburner with Bill Whittle, an Internet streaming television show
- Afterburner (Fun Spot), a former roller coaster at Fun Spot Amusement Park & Zoo in Angola, Indiana

== Other uses ==
- Afterburner (wireless networking) or 125 High Speed Mode, an enhancement to the IEEE 802.11g wireless networking standard
- Excess post-exercise oxygen consumption, a post-workout body effect also known as the afterburner effect
- Apple Afterburner card, an accelerator card for the 3rd generation Mac Pro
- MSI Afterburner, a graphics card utility software
