= WarioWare: Twisted! =

2004 video game

- Australian box art
- Developers: Nintendo SPD; Intelligent Systems
- Publisher: Nintendo
- Directors: Goro Abe; Osamu Yamauchi; Teruyuki Hirosawa
- Producers: Yoshio Sakamoto; Ryoichi Kitanishi
- Artist: Ko Takeuchi
- Composers: Kenichi Nishimaki; Masanobu Matsunaga; Yasuhisa Baba
- Series: Wario
- Platform: Game Boy Advance
- Release: JP: October 14, 2004; AU: May 19, 2005; NA: May 23, 2005
- Genre: Action
- Mode: Single-player

WarioWare: Twisted! (Note: Known in Japan as Mawaru Made in Wario (Japanese: まわる メイドインワリオ, Hepburn: Mawaru Meido in Wario; lit. Turning: Made in Wario)) is an action video game developed by Nintendo and Intelligent Systems and published by Nintendo for the Game Boy Advance. It was released on October 14, 2004 in Japan; May 19, 2005 in Australia; and May 23, 2005 in North America. The third game in the WarioWare series and the seventh in the Wario series overall, Twisted! was the last Wario game to be released on a Game Boy family system, having been released after the launch of the Nintendo DS outside of Japan.

Wario and his friend Dr. Crygor invent Game Boy Advance games and units that only react when tilted around. The game follows the WarioWare formula with a variety of games that last for only a few seconds. The cartridge utilizes a gyro sensor and players must spin and twist in order to play the games.

Twisted! was critically acclaimed and has won numerous awards. Reviewers found the gyro sensor to be innovative and adding to the gameplay aspect.

It is one of only two Game Boy Advance games to include force feedback, the other being Drill Dozer.

== Gameplay ==
Twisted follows a similar format to its predecessor, WarioWare, Inc.: Mega Microgames!, in which players must play through a series of "microgames"; short minigames that require the player to understand and clear its objective within a few seconds. Twisted! features unique gameplay thanks to its built-in gyro sensor, which detects the rotation of the handheld system. As such, many of the microgames require the player to physically rotate the system in order to clear. For example, players may have to empty a bin's contents, steer a plane, or guide something through a maze. Microgames become more complex as the game progresses, with later microgames requiring more time to complete, sometimes requiring the player to fully rotate their system. In each stage, microgames appear consecutively, presenting the player with a simple prompt with which to clear the microgame. Failing a microgame, either by losing the game or running out of time, one of four lives will be deducted, with the stage ending once the player runs out of lives.

This game changes the scoring from the other WarioWare titles. Previously, the score was the number of games that were played, but Twisted only counts the number of games that the player won. Failing a microgame does not delay the boss stage. The game features items called "souvenirs", which are unlocked after boss stages in story mode. Records, musical instruments, figurines, games, and many quirky items are possible to unlock.

=== Gyro sensor ===
The Twisted cartridge has a built-in gyro sensor and rumble feature (for feedback during rotation). Most of the microgames are played by rotating the entire handheld device. The gyro sensor uses a piezoelectric gyroscope developed by NEC to detect angular movement.

Because the game automatically calibrates the gyro sensor when the game is turned on (and after every "micro-game"), it works with both top-loading slots (like the Game Boy Advance) and bottom-loading slots (like all other models after the original GBA: Game Boy Advance SP, Nintendo DS, Game Boy Micro and Nintendo DS Lite). The manual states that Twisted! is not compatible with the Game Boy Player; although the game loads as normal, players would have to carry and tilt the connected GameCube console and use its controller for button presses, thus it is simply not practical.

== Plot ==
One day, while Wario is playing with one of his Game Boy Advance consoles, he becomes frustrated with a particularly hard game on it and throws the system at a wall, causing it to bounce back and hit him on the head. After his temporary rage, he notices his GBA is broken. He goes to Dr. Crygor's Lab and requests his help in mending it. Crygor, however, mistakes it for a test subject for his new invention, the Gravitator—a device that is shaped like a washing machine, which has the power to manipulate gravity, change gravity's direction, and cause gravity distortion. Crygor places the GBA in the Gravitator, causing it to spits out dozens of units similar in form factor to Game Boy Advance units and versions. He demonstrates that in order to play the GBA games with them, the device must be physically moved or/and by pressing the buttons. Mona and 9-Volt arrive and play with these new units, enjoying themselves. Wario, taking note of their reaction, decides to take advantage of these motion-sensing abilities as a selling point, and gets his friends to design GBA games based on this concept, and they make the game WarioWare: Twisted!.

The rest of the game features stories of all the characters in the game, each one going to Club Sugar once their stage is complete. Wario chases a mouse that almost breaks his WarioWatch (Smorgasbord Sampler). Mona tries to deliver pizza from her business, Mona Pizza, while avoiding a rival restaurant, Pizza Dinosaur (Mini Spin). Jimmy T. and his parents play on their phones at Club Sugar (Big Tipper). Kat and Ana encounter a troll after getting lost on a field trip (Tapped Out). Dribble and Spitz fix their taxi and use a feature that allows it to travel through space (Steer Clear). Crygor attempts to upgrade the Gravitator (Gravitator). Orbulon tries to figure out the password to initiate the warp drive of his ship, the Oinker, in order to escape a black hole (Time Warp). 9-Volt becomes friends with a new student named 18-Volt at his school, and 18-Volt is initiated into the crew (Spintendo Classics).

In the final level, Spandex Challenge, WarioWare: Twisted! becomes a big success in the end, and the Gravitator is used with to keep up production of the GBA units by using various objects everywhere to turn them into more units. One day, after an accident in the Gravitator involving Wario sitting on the conveyor belt to play his game, Wario is trapped and merged with the Gravitator, its powers, his unit, and the production line, causing the Gravitator to malfunction and corrupt itself and Wario, turning the machine evil and giving it more powers, and transforming Wario into a powerful and unbeatable supervillain version of Wario named Wario-Man, who then plots to save the world of its money. He steals the corrupted Gravitator from Crygor, merges himself with it, and takes control over the Gravitator, causing it to grow a jetpack and gain even more powers. He takes it to outer space, where he turns himself and the Gravitator into an also unstoppable giant robot suit. Wario's friends use Dribble and Spitz's Taxi and Orbulon's new ship, the Oinker 2, to catch up to Wario-Man, but the ship's defense system is activated upon sight of Wario-Man's suit, deeming him foreign, and it makes the ship's cannons easily blast the robot, destroying the Gravitator and its effects, and reverting Wario back to himself, not knowing he was inside. After crashing with the remains into the ocean and is saved by Crygor, Wario jokingly decides to fire everyone for destroying the Gravitator and his robot.

== Development ==
Nintendo programmer Kazuyoshi Osawa took the lead of developing the game engine with several members of the original WarioWare staff. Intelligent Systems provided half of the workforce including several programmers.

== European release ==
Despite initially being announced for a European release, WarioWare: Twisted! has never been released in Europe.

After its Australian and North American releases, WarioWare: Twisted! was originally scheduled to be released in Europe on June 24, 2005. It was later delayed to September 2005, then to February 24, 2006, then to December 8, 2006. Nintendo of Europe later changed its release date to "TBD" on the company's website. In the January 2008 issue of Official Nintendo Magazine, in the "Ask Nintendo" section, a representative for Nintendo of Europe stated that the delay was because Twisted! was still undergoing the compulsory LGA testing and approval for Europe. Near the end of 2008, however, with still no release in the region, Nintendo removed the page for the game from its European website, following the discontinuation of the Game Boy Advance.

Contrary to a popular rumor that the lack of a European release is due to the game cartridge's gyroscope using mercury, it uses a piezoelectric gyroscope that does not contain mercury. European copies of the 2008 Wii game Super Smash Bros. Brawl list the title in the GBA section of the included database of Nintendo games as "Not released".

== Reception ==
Reception

Aggregate score
Aggregator	Score
Metacritic	88/100

Review scores
Publication	Score
Electronic Gaming Monthly	9/10
Eurogamer	9/10
Famitsu	36/40
Game Informer	7.75/10
GameSpot	8.8/10
GameSpy	4.5/5
GameTrailers	9/10
GameZone	9.5/10
IGN	9.5/10
Nintendo Life	9/10
Nintendo Power	8.5/10
Nintendo World Report	(JP) 9.5/10 (US) 9/10
X-Play	5/5
The Sydney Morning Herald	4/5

WarioWare: Twisted! received "generally favorable reviews", according to the review aggregation website Metacritic. In Japan, Famitsu gave it a score of 36 out of 40. GamePro called it "an odd and amusing challenge. It is simply twisted." (Note: GamePro gave the game three 4/5 scores for graphics, sound, and fun factor, and 4.5/5 for control in an early review.) Electronic Gaming Monthly gave it universal acclaim while it was still in development.

IGN named Twisted! the No. 1 GBA game of all time, as well as its "GBA Game of the Month" for May 2005.

== See also ==
- Koro Koro Puzzle Happy Panechu!
- Kirby Tilt 'n' Tumble
- Yoshi's Universal Gravitation
