= Game Boy Advance =

Handheld game console by Nintendo

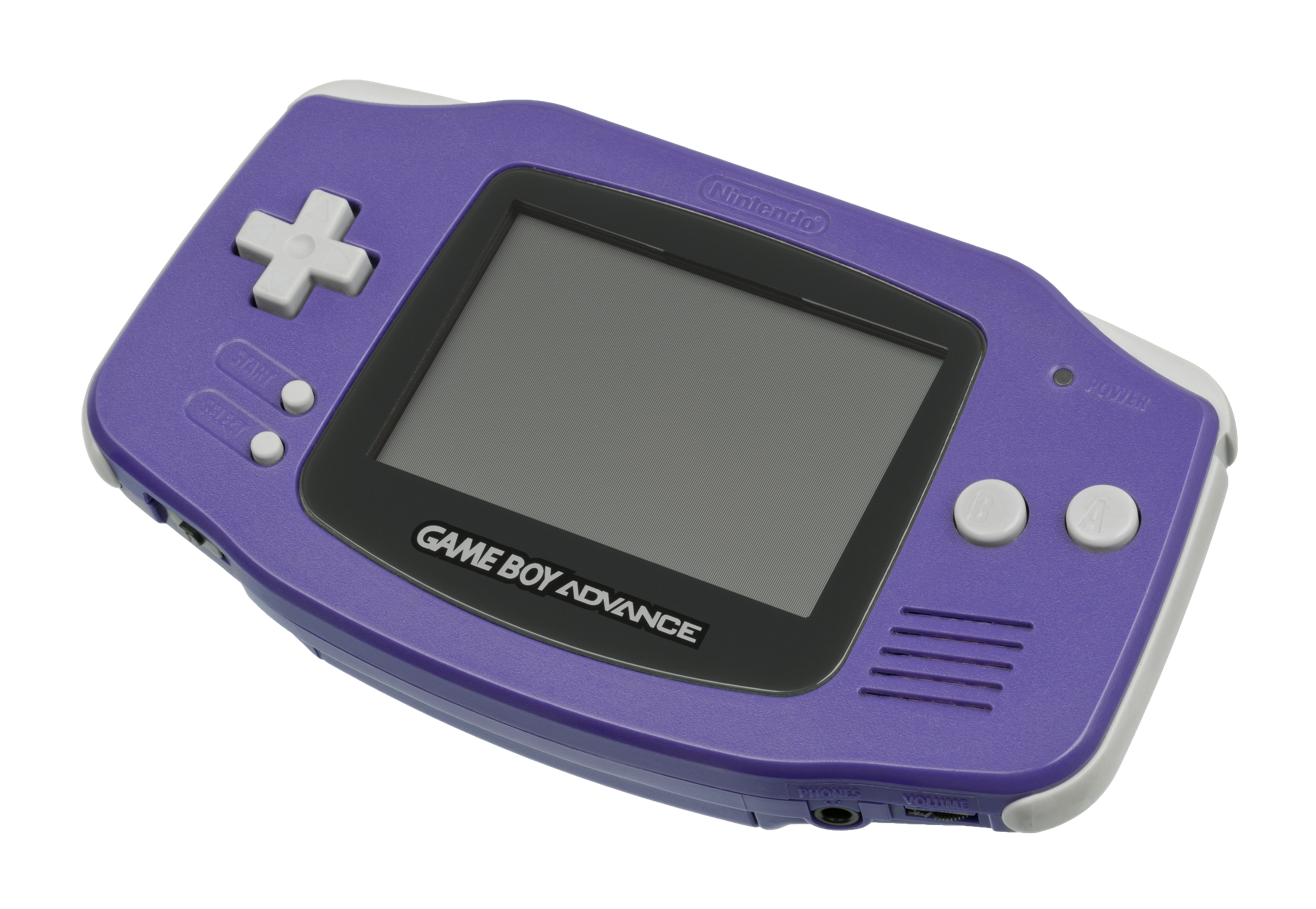
- Original Game Boy Advance in Indigo
- Also known as: CN: iQue Game Boy Advance
- Developer: Nintendo Research & Engineering
- Manufacturer: Nintendo
- Product family: Game Boy
- Type: Handheld game console
- Generation: Sixth
- Released: March 21, 2001: JP: March 21, 2001; NA: June 11, 2001; PAL: June 22, 2001
- Introductory price: US$99.99 (equivalent to $180 in 2025)
- Discontinued: 2010
- Units sold: 81.51 million
- Media: Game Boy Game Pak; Game Boy Color Game Pak; Game Boy Advance Game Pak
- System on a chip: Nintendo CPU AGB
- CPU: ARM7TDMI @ 16.8 MHz; Sharp SM83 @ 4.2 / 8.4 MHz
- Memory: 288 KB RAM, 98 KB Video RAM
- Display: Reflective TFT LCD, 240 × 160 px, 61.2 × 40.8 mm (2.41 × 1.61 in)
- Power: 2 × AA batteries
- Online services: JP: Mobile System GB
- Dimensions: 82 × 144.5 × 24.5 mm (3.23 × 5.69 × 0.96 in)
- Best-selling game: Pokémon Ruby and Sapphire (16 million) (list)
- Backward compatibility: Game Boy; Game Boy Color
- Predecessor: Game Boy Color
- Successor: Nintendo DS; Nintendo DSi
- Related: Game Boy Advance SP; Game Boy Micro

The Game Boy Advance (Note: Japanese: ゲームボーイアドバンス, Hepburn: Gēmu Bōi Adobansu) (GBA) is a handheld game console developed and marketed by Nintendo, which was released in Japan on March 21, 2001, and in other regions in June. It was later released in mainland China in 2004, under the name iQue Game Boy Advance. Compared to the Game Boy Color it succeeded, the console offered a significantly more powerful ARM7 processor and improved graphics, while retaining backward compatibility with games initially developed for its predecessor.

The 32-bit GBA is part of the sixth generation of video game consoles, competing against Nokia's N-Gage and Bandai's Japan-only WonderSwan. The original model was followed in 2003 by the Game Boy Advance SP, a redesigned model with a frontlit screen and clamshell form factor. A newer revision of the SP with a backlit screen was released in 2005. A miniaturized redesign, the Game Boy Micro, was released in September 2005.

By June 2010, the Game Boy Advance series including revisions, had sold 81.51 million units worldwide, massively outselling its competitors. Its successor, the Nintendo DS, launched on November 21, 2004, was backward compatible with GBA games. GBA sales ended by 2010 after over nine years.

In 2008, the GBA was still Nintendo's predominant handheld console in terms of market presence and global installed base. It was only in late October 2008 that Nintendo announced that the Nintendo DS had officially surpassed the GBA worldwide in sales. This milestone consolidated the definitive global leadership transition between generations, although in specific markets, such as the United States, the GBA was only surpassed by the Nintendo DS in sales in late 2009.

== History ==
=== Project Atlantis ===
When the original Game Boy launched in 1989, many questioned Nintendo's decision to release a monochrome handheld console, when competitors like the Lynx and Game Gear had color screens. However, the rivals' color displays were criticized for their poor battery life and bulky size, while the Game Boy's better portability and battery longevity increased its popularity.

Nintendo publicly pledged to develop a color version of the Game Boy only when the technology overcame the limitations of existing color handhelds. Internally, however, a team led by Satoru Okada—who had worked on the original Game Boy—was already experimenting with color screens. Their early 1990s prototype, codenamed "Project Atlantis," featured a color display and a 32-bit processor designed by ARM. Despite the promising technology, the team was not satisfied with the outcome and the project was shelved by 1997.

However, as competitors such as the Neo Geo Pocket and WonderSwan entered the market, Nintendo decided to create a color version of the Game Boy by combining the color screen they had been testing for Project Atlantis with a faster version of the existing Game Boy's 8-bit processor. The Game Boy Color launched in 1998.

=== Game Boy Advance ===
Still under pressure from its competitors' handhelds, Nintendo started developing a successor to the Game Boy Color. The project, codenamed Advanced Game Boy (AGB), would utilize the 32-bit processing power from Project Atlantis. Details about the GBA emerged at the Space World 1999 trade show in late August.

Nintendo officially announced the Game Boy Advance on September 1, 1999, revealing details about the system's specifications, and that the handheld would first be released in Japan in August 2000, with the North American and European launch dates slated for the end of the same year. On August 21, 2000, IGN showed images of a GBA development kit running a demonstrational port of Yoshi's Story, and on August 22, pre-production images of the GBA were revealed in Famitsu magazine in Japan.

The GBA's design featured a landscape form factor, diverging from the portrait layout of the previous Game Boy models. The design put the buttons to the sides of the device instead of below the screen. The shift was the work of French designer Gwénaël Nicolas and his Tokyo-based studio, Curiosity Inc.

In an announcement on August 24, 2000, Nintendo revealed the final design of the GBA to the public, announced its Japan and North America launch dates, and revealed the ten launch games. At Space World 2000, Nintendo also showcased several peripherals, including the GBA link cable, the GameCube – GBA link cable, a rechargeable battery pack, and an infrared communication adaptor. By March 2001, Nintendo confirmed the $99.99 price ($186.54 in 2026), and announced 15 launch games for the system, with over 60 expected by the end of the year.

Nintendo spent about $75 million marketing the system in North America.

All Game Boy Advance models were discontinued in the Americas in 2008, and globally by the end of 2010.

== Hardware ==
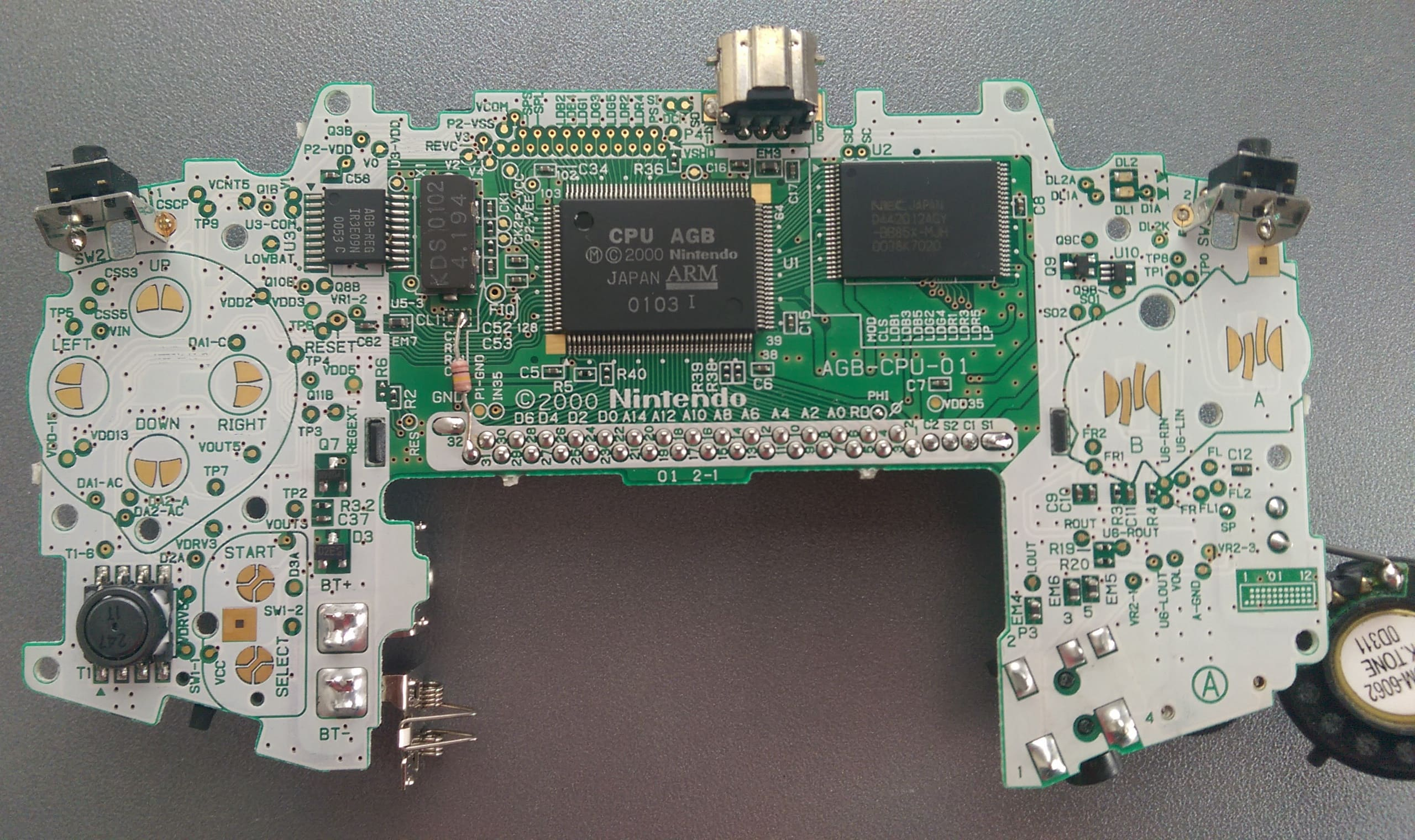
The Game Boy Advance motherboard (annotated version)

The Game Boy Advance uses a custom system on a chip (SoC), integrating the CPU and other major components into a single package, named the CPU AGB by Nintendo. Manufactured by the Sharp Corporation, the SoC contains two processors: the ARM7TDMI running at a clock rate of 16.776 megahertz (MHz) for GBA games, and the Sharp SM83 running at 4.194 MHz or 8.389 MHz for backward compatibility with Game Boy and Game Boy Color games. The system operates in two modes: GBA mode using the ARM7TDMI, and the backward-compatible CGB mode using the SM83.

The ARM7TDMI is a hybrid 16-bit and 32-bit RISC processor based on the ARM architecture, designed to maximize performance under power and storage constraints, making it more suitable for use in a handheld device. It features sixteen 32-bit registers and a 32-bit bus connected to 32 kilobytes (KB) of "working" RAM on the SoC, and 16-bit buses interfacing with the 256 KB of "working" RAM on the motherboard and the Game Pak. In addition to the 32-bit ARM instruction set, the CPU supports the 16-bit THUMB instruction set, which is used when executing instructions over the 16-bit buses.

The SM83 is a hybrid between two other 8-bit processors: the Intel 8080 and the Zilog Z80. The SM83 has the seven 8-bit registers of the 8080 (lacking the alternate registers of the Z80) but uses the Z80's programming syntax and extra bit manipulation instructions, along with adding new instructions to optimize the processor for certain operations related to the way the hardware was arranged. Like the Game Boy Color, the SM83 in the Advance could be commanded to operate at either 4.194 MHz when playing games compatible with the original Game Boy or at 8.389 MHz when playing games designed for the Game Boy Color. The SoC also contains a 2 KB "bootstrap" ROM which is used to start up the device in CGB mode.

The CPU CGB incorporates an updated version of Nintendo's Picture Processing Unit (PPU), which was used in the Game Boy, Game Boy Color, and Super Nintendo Entertainment System. The PPU is essentially a basic GPU that renders visuals using 96 KB of Video RAM located inside the CPU CGB. Inside the PPU itself is 1 KB of object attribute memory and 1 KB of palette RAM, which are optimized for fast rendering. The display itself is a 2.9-inch (diagonal) thin-film transistor (TFT) color liquid-crystal display (LCD), measuring 61.2 millimeters (2.41 in) wide by 40.8 millimeters (1.61 in) high. The screen is 240 pixels wide by 160 pixels high in a 3:2 aspect ratio.

Foreground objects are sprites with up to 128 per frame, sized from 8×8 to 64×64 pixels, and with 16 or 256 colors. Backgrounds can be rendered in one of six different modes. The first three are the "character modes," which use traditional tile map graphics: Mode 0 offers four static layers, Mode 1 has three layers with one affine transformation layer (which can be rotated and/or scaled), and Mode 2 has two affine layers. The other three are the "bitmap modes" which allow for rendering 3D geometry: Mode 3 has a single full-sized, fully-colored (32,768 colors) frame, Mode 4 provides two full-sized frames with 256 colors each, and Mode 5 provides two half-sized (160×128 pixels), fully-colored frames. Having two bitmaps allows "page-flipping" to avoid the artifacts that can sometimes appear when re-drawing a bitmap. While the bitmap modes were considered cutting-edge, most games avoided using them because they cost a lot of CPU resources.

For sound, the Game Boy Advance features two PCM sample player channels, which work in combination with the Audio Processing Unit (APU), a programmable sound generator first used by the legacy Game Boy. The APU has four channels: a pulse wave generation channel with frequency and volume variation, a second pulse wave generation channel with only volume variation, a wave channel that can reproduce any waveform recorded in RAM, and a white noise channel with volume variation.

The Game Boy Advance features a D-pad (directional pad) and six action buttons labeled as: A, B, L, R, SELECT, and START. The top of the console has a link port that allows it to be connected to other Game Boy devices using a Game Link Cable or a Wireless Adapter, or the GameCube home console with a special GameCube – Game Boy Advance link cable.

=== Technical specifications ===
	Game Boy Advance
Height	82 mm (3.2 in)
Width	144.5 mm (5.69 in)
Depth	24.5 mm (0.96 in)
Weight	140 g (4.9 oz)
Display	2.9-inch (diagonal) reflective thin-film transistor (TFT) color liquid-crystal display (LCD), 40.8 mm × 61.2 mm (1.61 in × 2.41 in)
Resolution	240 (w) × 160 (h) pixels (3:2 aspect ratio)
Frame rate	59.727500569606 Hz
Color support	32,768 colors, up to 511 simultaneously in character mode, all may display simultaneously in Bitmap mode
System on a chip (SoC)	Nintendo CPU AGB
Processors	16.7772 MHz ARM7TDMI (32-bit); 4.194304 MHz / 8.388608 MHz Sharp SM83 (custom Intel 8080/Zilog Z80 hybrid, 8-bit) (Note: 4.194304 MHz for Game Boy backward compatibility, 8.388608 MHz for Game Boy Color backward compatibility)
Memory	On SoC: 32 KB RAM, 98 KB Video RAM (includes 1 KB of object attribute memory and 1 KB of palette RAM); Internal: 256 KB RAM
Power	Internal: 2 × AA batteries
Battery life	Up to 15 hours
Sound	Channels: Dual 8-bit DAC for stereo sound (called Direct Sound), plus all legacy channels from Game Boy. The DACs can be used to play back streams of wave data, or used to output multiple wave samples processed or mixed in software by the CPU.; Outputs: Built-in mono speaker, stereo 3.5mm headphone jack
I/O	Game Link Cable (512 kbit/s between up to 4 devices); Game Pak slot
Controls	Eight-way control pad; Six action buttons (A, B, L, R, Start, Select); Volume slider; Power switch

=== Color variants ===
The Game Boy Advance was available in numerous colors and limited editions throughout its production. It was initially available in Arctic, Black, Orange (Japan Only), Fuchsia (translucent pink), Glacier (translucent blue), and Indigo. Later in the system's lifespan, additional colors and special editions were released, including: Red, Clear Orange/Black, Platinum, White, Gold (Japan Only), Hello Kitty edition (pink with Hello Kitty and logo on bezel), The King of Fighters edition (black with images on bezel and buttons), Chobits edition (translucent light blue, with images on bezel and buttons), Battle Network Rockman EXE 2 (light blue with images on bezel), Mario Bros. edition (Glacier with Mario and Luigi on bezel), and Yomiuri Giants edition (Glacier with images on bezel).

Several Pokémon-themed limited-edition systems were made available in Pokémon Center stores in Japan. These editions include: Gold Pokémon edition (Gold with Pikachu and Pichu on bezel), Suicune edition (blue/grey with greyscale Pikachu and Pichu on bezel, and a Pokémon Center sticker on the back), Celebi edition (olive green with Celebi images on bezel), and Latias/Latios edition (pink/red and purple, with images of Latias and Latios on bezel).

== Games ==
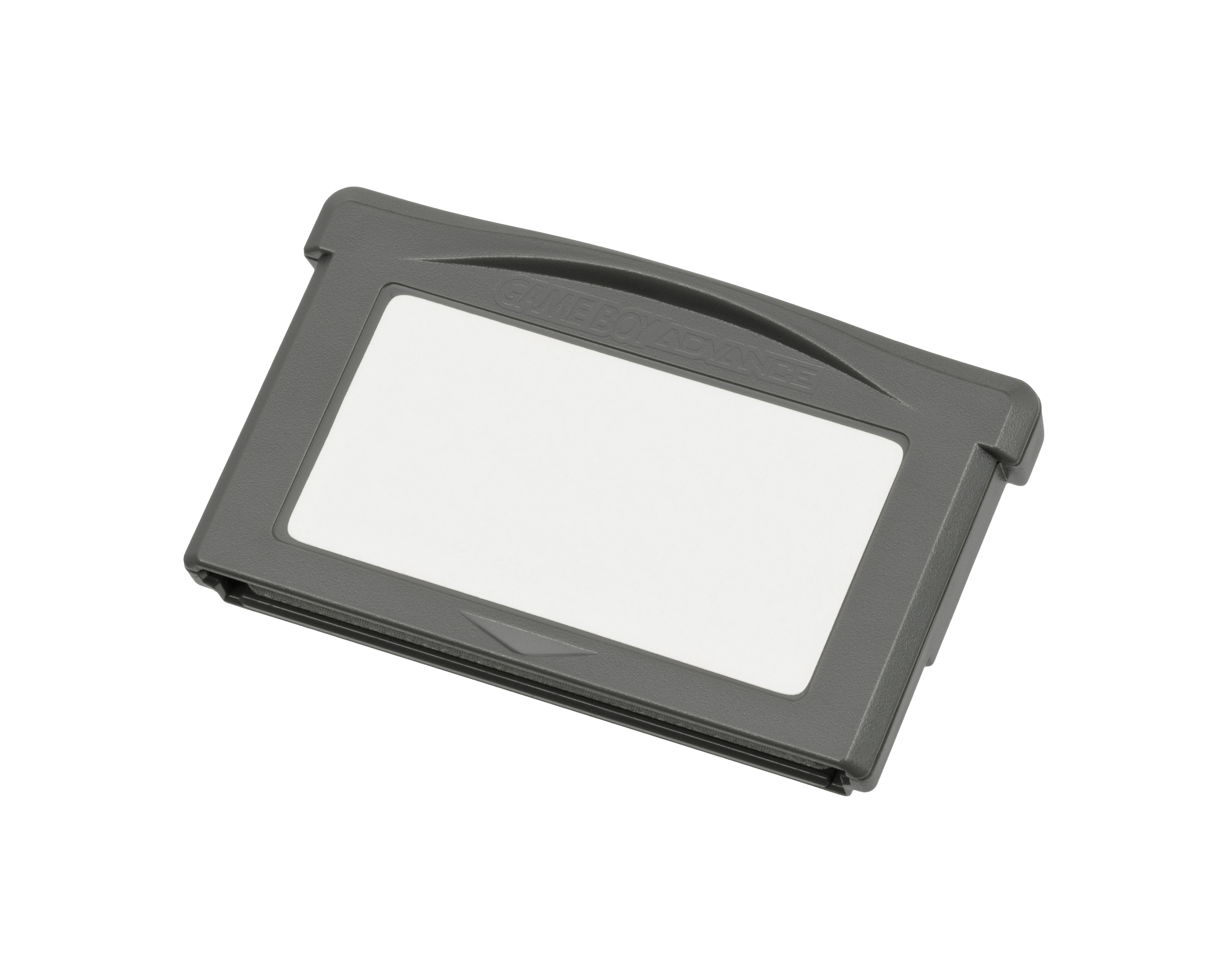
The Game Boy Advance Game Pak

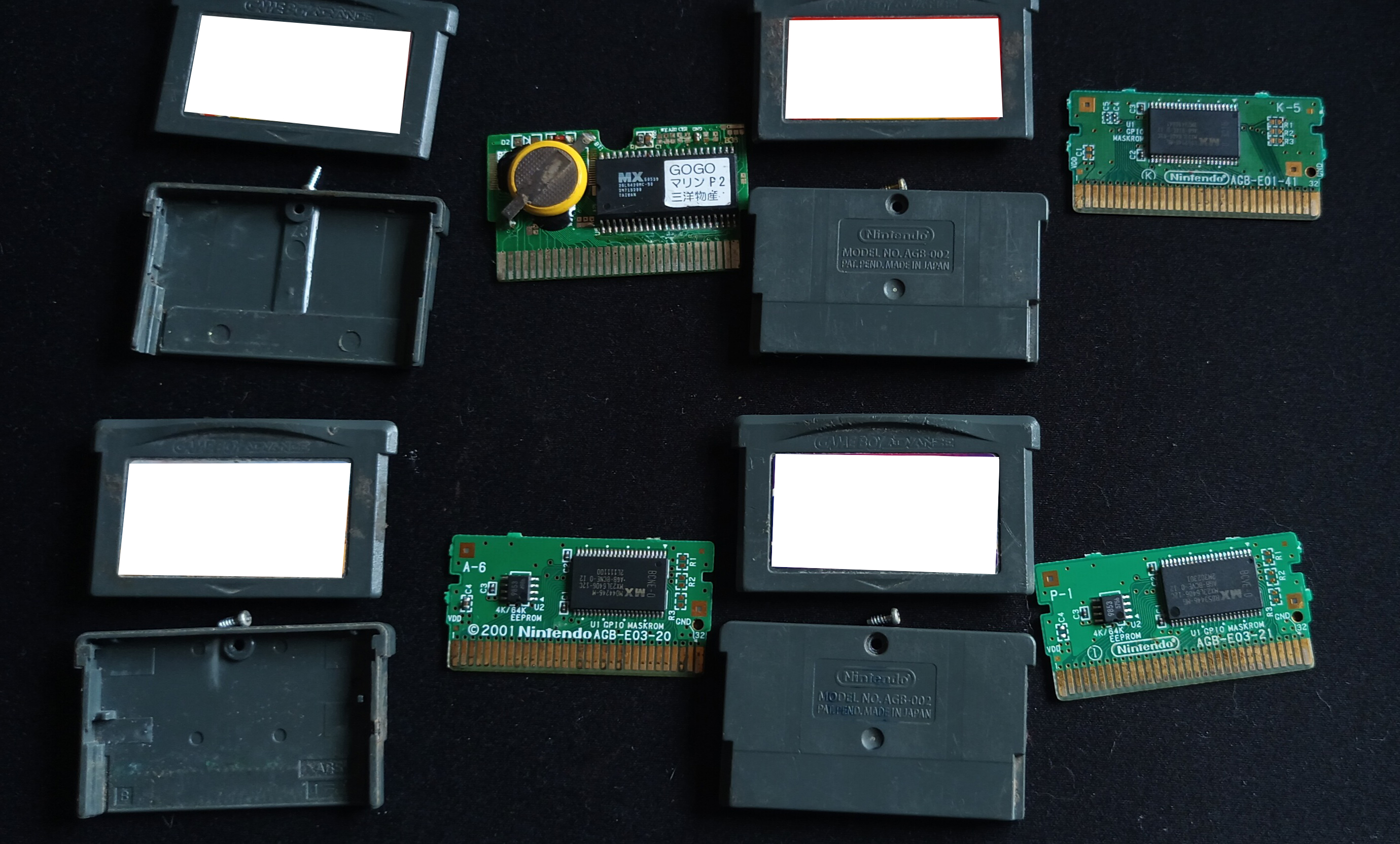
Various Game Boy Advance Game Paks disassembled

With hardware performance comparable to the Super Nintendo Entertainment System, the Game Boy Advance represents progress for sprite-based technology. The system's library includes platformers, SNES-like role-playing video games, and games ported from various 8-bit and 16-bit systems of the previous generations. This includes the Super Mario Advance series, and the system's backward compatibility with all earlier Game Boy titles. Though most GBA games primarily employ 2D graphics, some developers ambitiously designed some 3D GBA games that push the limits of the hardware, including some racing games.

Some cartridges are colored to resemble the game (usually for the Pokémon series; Pokémon Emerald, for example, being a clear emerald green). Others have special built-in features, including rumble features (Drill Dozer), tilt sensors (WarioWare: Twisted!, Yoshi's Universal Gravitation), and solar sensors (Boktai).

The last new Game Boy Advance game released in Japan was Final Fantasy VI Advance, released in November 2006; in North America, it was Samurai Deeper Kyo, released in February 2008; and in Europe, it was The Legend of Spyro: The Eternal Night, released in November 2007. Including re-releases, the last game in Europe was 2 Games in 1: Columns Crown / ChuChu Rocket!, released in November 2008; and in Japan, it was the special Knights in the Nightmare: Dept. Heaven Episodes Series Special Pack, released in September 2008, which included the GBA game Yggdra Union: We’ll Never Fight Alone alongside a Nintendo DS game.

While those games were the last to be officially released at the time, Sigma Star Saga DX, a remake of 2005's Sigma Star Saga, was made available for pre-order in March 2025 for the console. This would be followed by a game titled Shantae Advance: Risky Revolution, which was released the following April as the true final game for the system. It was originally in development until 2004, when work halted due to the lack of a publisher. Development resumed in 2023, using the same code and hardware.

=== Launch games ===
In Japan there were 25 launch games, 17 in North America and 15 in Europe.

Title	JP	NA	EU	Notes
Army Men Advance	No	Yes	Yes	Top-down shooter
Boku wa Koukuu Kanseikan	Yes	No	No	Simulation game
Castlevania: Circle of the Moon	Yes	Yes	Yes	Platform game in the Castlevania series. Released as 'Castlevania' in PAL regions.
ChuChu Rocket!	Yes	Yes	No	Port of the 1999 Dreamcast game
Earthworm Jim	No	Yes	No	Port of the 1994 platform game
EZ-Talk Shokyuuhen 1-6 Kan Set	Yes	No	No	One of the first games developed by NDcube
Fire Pro Wrestling	Yes	Yes	Yes	Top-down wrestler
F-Zero Maximum Velocity	Yes	Yes	Yes	Racing game, first F-Zero game to be released on a handheld game console, one of the first games developed by NDcube
Golf Master: Japan Golf Tour	Yes	No	No	Sports game
GT Advance Championship Racing	Yes	Yes	Yes	Racing game
Iridion 3D	No	Yes	No	Quasi-3D rail shooter game
J. League Pocket	Yes	No	No	Soccer game
Konami Krazy Racers	Yes	Yes	Yes	Kart racing game
Kuru Kuru Kururin	Yes	No	Yes	Puzzle game
Mega Man Battle Network	Yes	No	No	Real-time tactical RPG
Momotaru Matsuri	Yes	No	No	Role-playing game
Monster Guardians	Yes	No	No	Role-playing game
Mr. Driller 2	Yes	No	No	Port of the 2000 arcade game
Namco Museum	No	Yes	No	Compilation consisting of Ms. Pac-Man, Galaga, Galaxian, Pole Position, and Dig Dug
Napoleon	Yes	No	No	Real-time strategy game
Pinobee: Wings of Adventure	Yes	Yes	Yes	First game developed by Artoon
Pitfall: The Mayan Adventure	No	Yes	No	Port of the 1994 platform game
Play Novel Silent Hill	Yes	No	No	Visual novel based on the 1998 horror game
Power Pro Kun Pocket 3	Yes	No	No	Baseball game
Rayman Advance	No	Yes	Yes	Port of the 1995 platform game
Ready 2 Rumble Boxing: Round 2	No	Yes	Yes	Portable version of the 2000 boxing game
Super Dodge Ball Advance	Yes	Yes	No	Sports game
Super Mario Advance	Yes	Yes	Yes	Remake of Super Mario Bros. 2 (1988) and Mario Bros. (1983)
Tony Hawk's Pro Skater 2	No	Yes	Yes	Portable version of the 2000 skateboarding video game
Top Gear GT Championship	Yes	No	Yes	Racing game
Total Soccer Manager	No	No	Yes	Soccer manager
Tweety and the Magic Gems	Yes	No	Yes	Last Looney Tunes game published by Kemco
Winning Post	Yes	No	No	Horse racing game
Yu-Gi-Oh! Dungeon Dice Monsters	Yes	No	No	Dice-driven tactics game

=== Compatibility with other systems ===
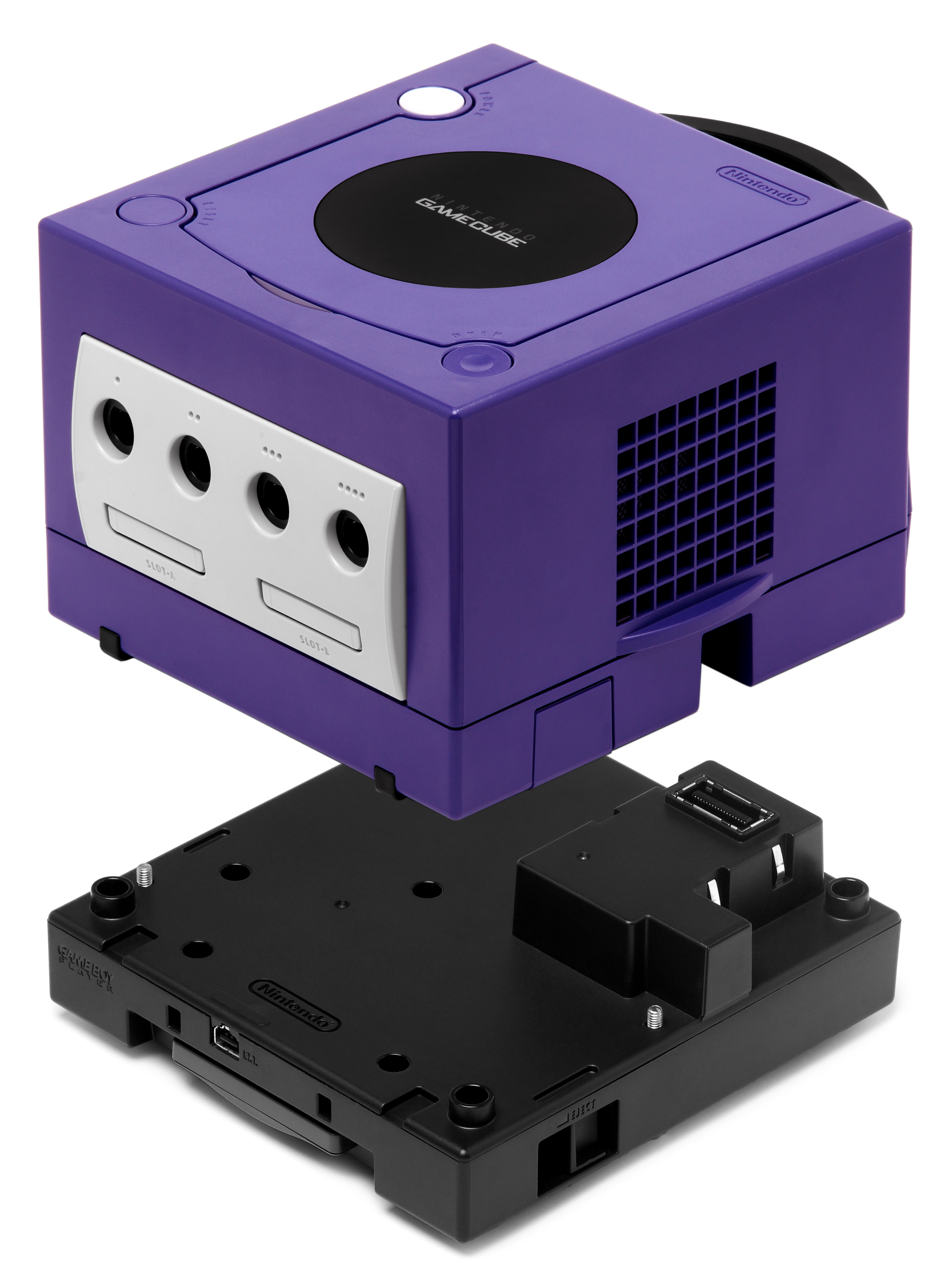
Game Boy Player under a GameCube

An add-on for the GameCube, known as the Game Boy Player, was released in 2003 as the successor to the Super Game Boy peripheral for the Super Nintendo Entertainment System. This add-on allows Game Boy Advance, Game Boy, and Game Boy Color games to be played on the GameCube. However, some games may have compatibility issues due to certain features requiring extra hardware; for instance, WarioWare: Twisted! would require the console to be rotated manually due to its nature as a tilt sensor game.

The GBA is the last Nintendo handheld system to bear the Game Boy name. Games developed for it are incompatible with older Game Boy systems, and each game's box carries a label indicating that the game is "not compatible with other Game Boy systems." Conversely, games designed for older Game Boy systems are compatible with the Game Boy Advance, with options to play such games on either their standard aspect ratios or a stretched fullscreen using the shoulder buttons.

Game Boy Advance cartridges are compatible with Nintendo DS models that support them with a dedicated GBA cartridge slot beneath the touch screen (specifically the original model and the Nintendo DS Lite), although they do not support multiplayer or features involving the use of GBA accessories due to the absence of the GBA's external peripheral port on the DS. They can also be used to unlock original content found in Nintendo DS games. The Nintendo DSi and Nintendo DSi XL lack a GBA cartridge slot, and therefore do not support backward compatibility with the GBA.

=== Digital re-releases ===
Since the Game Boy Advance was discontinued, many of its games have been re-released via digital distribution on later Nintendo consoles, mainly in the form of emulation. As part of an Ambassador Program for early adopters of the Nintendo 3DS system, ten GBA games, along with ten Nintendo Entertainment System games, were made available free for players who bought a 3DS system before the price drop on August 12, 2011. Unlike other Virtual Console games for the system, features such as the Home menu or save states are missing, since the games are running natively instead of via emulation. In January 2014, Nintendo President Satoru Iwata announced that Game Boy Advance games would be released on the Wii U's Virtual Console in April 2014. The first set of GBA games, including Advance Wars, Metroid Fusion, and Mario & Luigi: Superstar Saga, were released on April 3, 2014. All Virtual Console releases are single-player only, as they do not emulate multiplayer features enabled by Game Link cables.

In February 2023, Nintendo added Game Boy Advance games to the Nintendo Classics library for its Nintendo Switch Online service, exclusively to those with the Expansion Pack tier. For the first time, players are able to play multiplayer games in their emulated form, online. This application emulates the Game Boy Player, meaning that games that support GameCube controller rumble work with the vibration of the Switch controllers.

== Accessories ==
=== Official ===
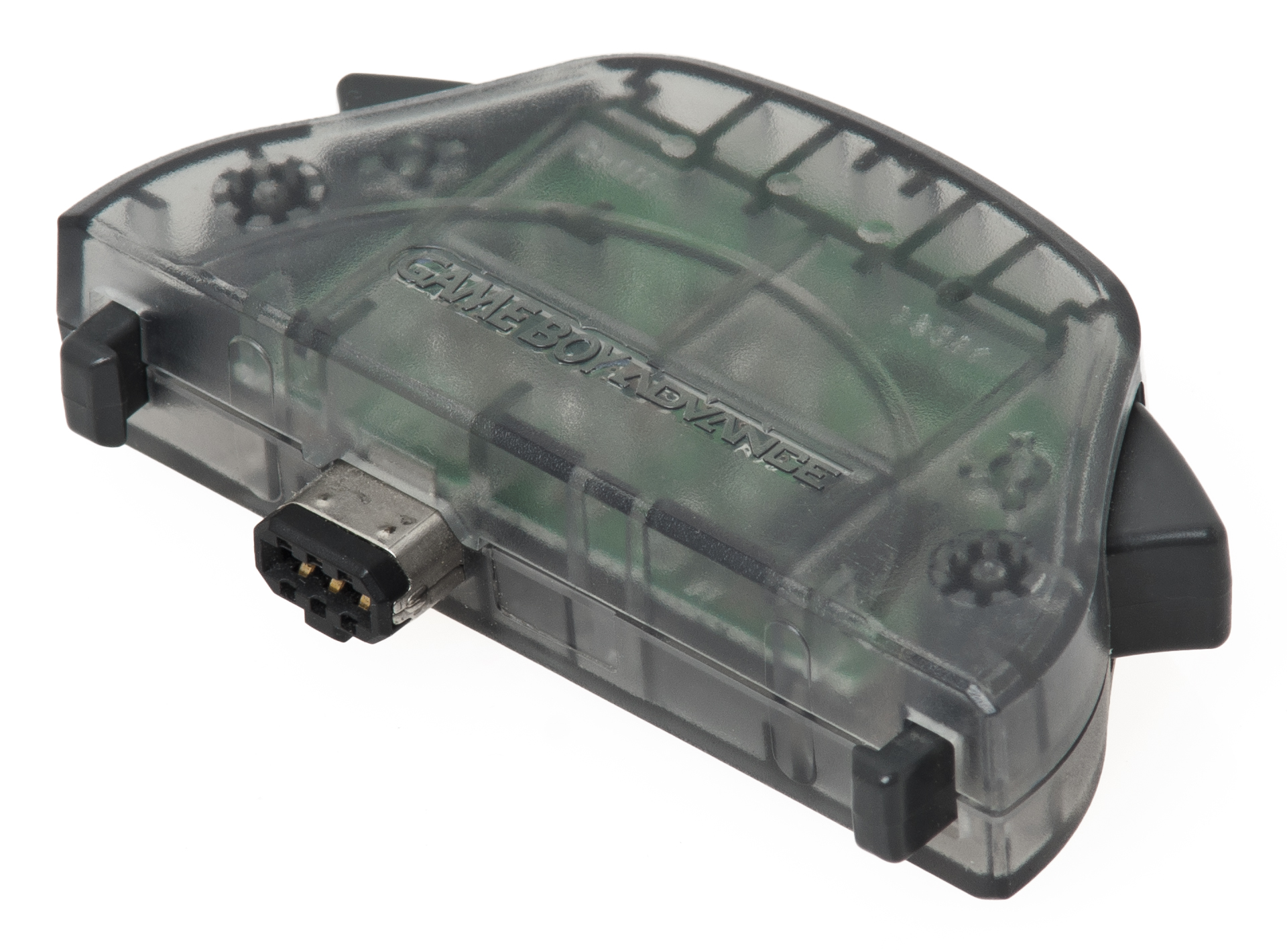
The Wireless Adapter was packed in with Pokémon FireRed and LeafGreen.

Nintendo released several add-ons for the Game Boy Advance, including:

- Advance Movie: A SmartMedia player released only in Japan featuring select films and animated series.
- e-Reader: A scanning device released in Japan (2001) and North America (2002) that read specialized cards allowing classic games to be played (like Donkey Kong and Excitebike) or unlocked in-game content in Game Boy Advance (like Super Mario Advance 4 and Pokémon Ruby and Sapphire) and GameCube titles (like Animal Crossing).
- Game Boy Advance Video: Special cartridges featuring select feature films (like Shrek and Shark Tale) or two episodes of an animated series (like Pokémon and SpongeBob SquarePants).
- GameCube – Game Boy Advance link cable: Enabled connectivity between the Game Boy Advance and GameCube for select games. It also allowed the Game Boy Advance to function as a controller for some titles.
- Mobile Adapter GB: Connects the console to a mobile phone, utilizing its cellular network for online interactions via the Mobile System GB service. Limited game support and high costs led to low adoption. The service ended on December 18, 2002, and it was never released outside Japan.
- Play-Yan: A MP3 (audio) and MPEG4 (video) player featuring a headphone jack and SD card slot for media playback. Initially released in Japan, it later launched in Europe as the Nintendo MP3 Player (minus video functionality) but never in North America.
- Wireless Adapter: Attached to the back of the Game Boy Advance, replacing the Game Link Cable for multiplayer connectivity. It was priced at US$20 (equivalent to $34 in 2025) and was bundled with Pokémon FireRed and LeafGreen. Due to its late release, fewer than 20 games support it.

=== Unofficial ===
Other accessories for the Game Boy Advance include:

- Afterburner: An internal front-lighting system by Triton Labs, requiring disassembly, case modification, and soldering for installation. It resembled the Game Boy Advance SP's original front-lit display. Despite voiding the system's warranty, the Afterburner was highly popular, with demand exceeding supply during the 2002 holiday season.
- Glucoboy: A blood glucose monitor with integrated games, released in Australia to support children with diabetes.
- WormCam: A Nyko-manufactured camera that attached to the top of the Game Boy Advance and connected via the link port. Images could be transferred to a computer using a USB cable and software.

== Revisions ==
=== Game Boy Advance SP ===
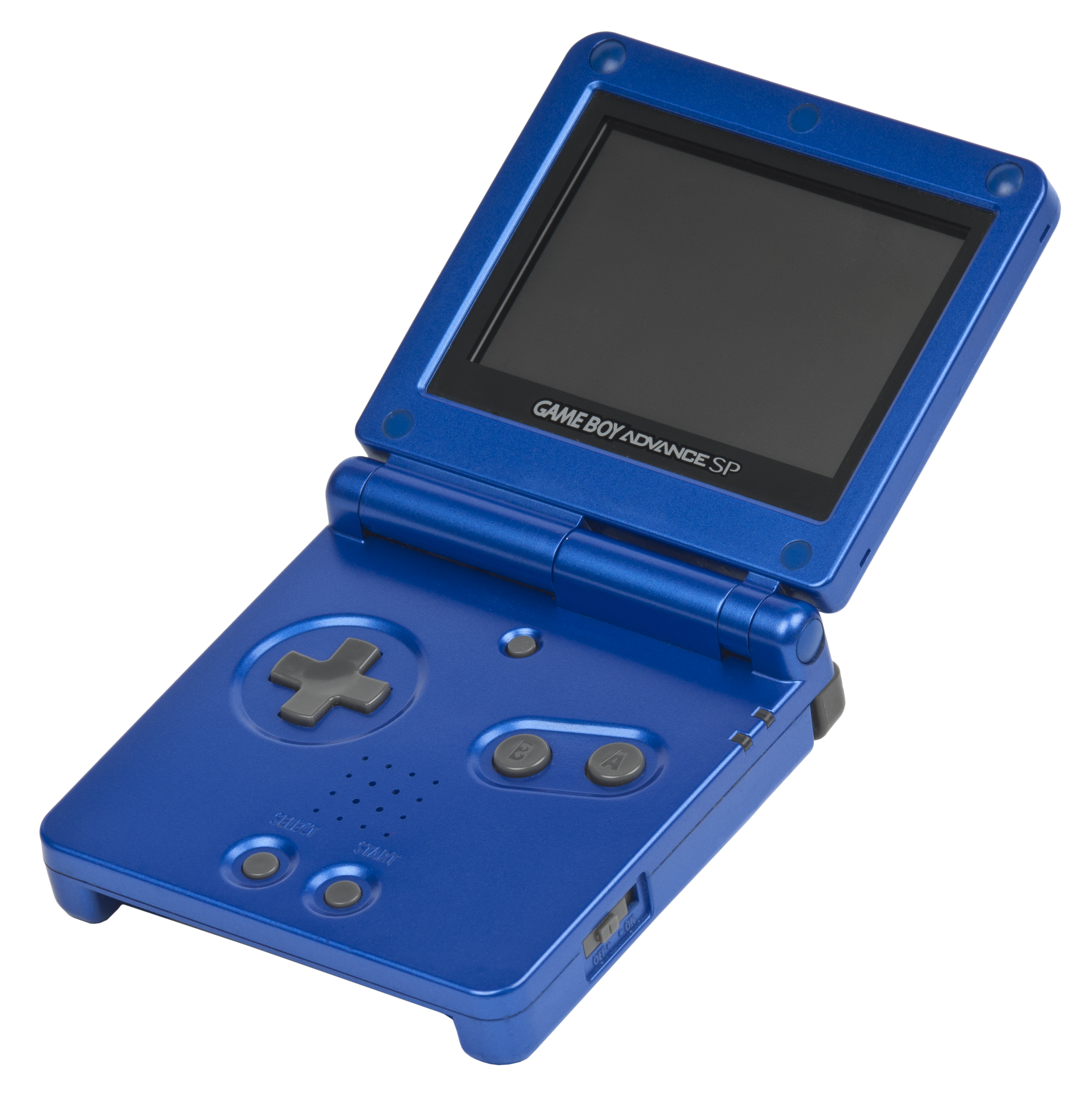
Game Boy Advance SP

In early 2003, Nintendo introduced a new form-factor for the handheld, known as the Game Boy Advance SP (model AGS-001). The redesigned unit features a clamshell design that resembles a pocket-size laptop computer, including a folding case approximately one-half the size of the original unit. It has a rechargeable lithium-ion battery, a significantly brighter LCD screen, and an internal front-light that can be toggled on and off. The redesign was intended to address some common complaints about the original Game Boy Advance, which had been criticized for being somewhat uncomfortable to use, especially due to a dark screen.

==== Backlit model (AGS-101) ====
On September 19, 2005, Nintendo released a new version of the SP, model AGS-101, that features a brighter backlit display. The switch that controls the backlight now toggles between two brightness levels.

=== Game Boy Micro ===
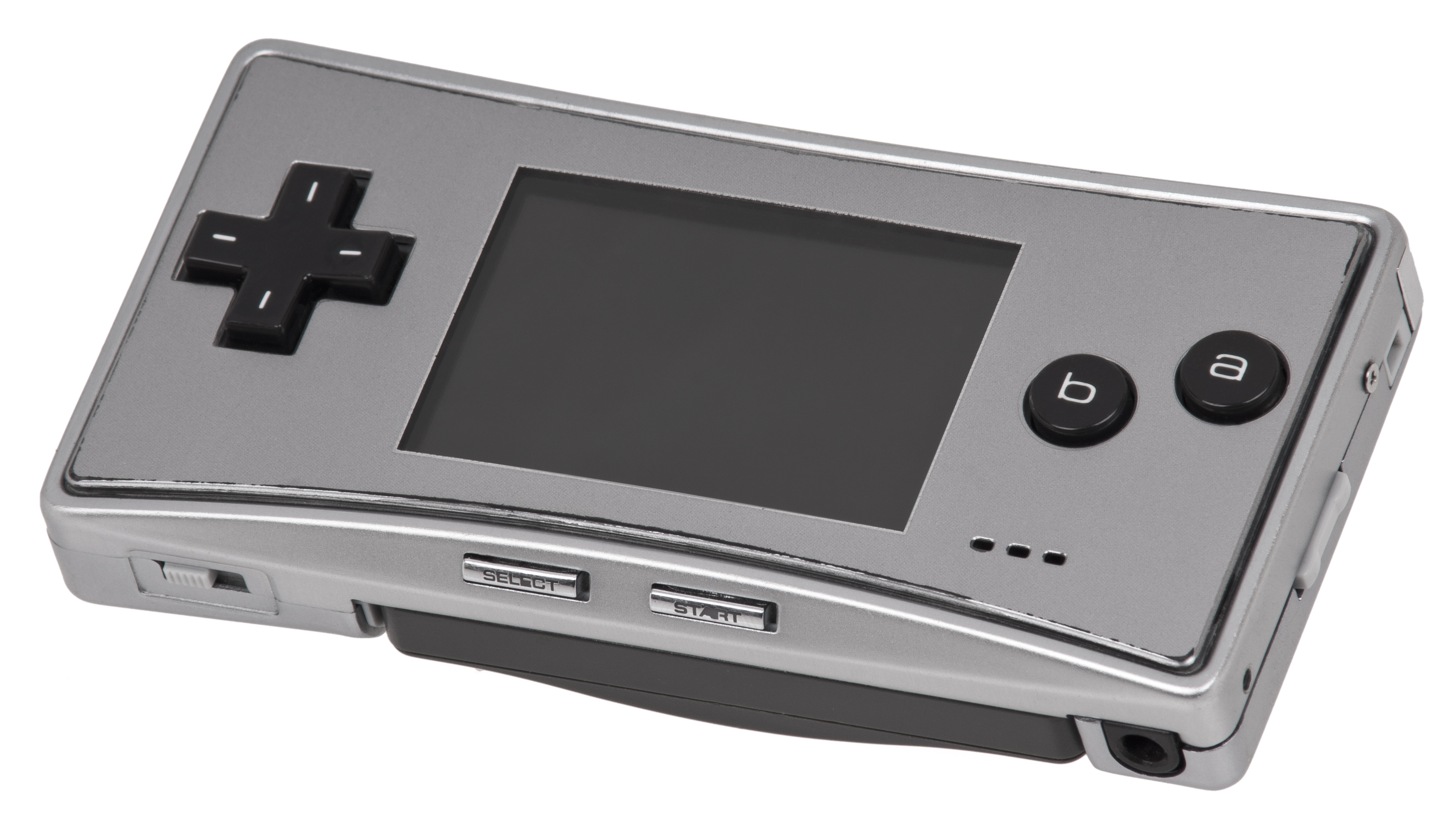
Game Boy Micro

In September 2005, Nintendo released a second redesign of the Game Boy Advance. This model, dubbed the Game Boy Micro, is similar in style to the original Game Boy Advance's horizontal orientation, but is much smaller and sleeker. The Game Boy Micro allows the user to switch between several colored faceplates to allow customization, a feature which Nintendo advertised heavily around the Game Boy Micro's launch. Nintendo also hoped that this "fashion" feature would help target audiences outside of typical video game players. Unlike the previous Game Boy Advance models, the Game Boy Micro is unable to support Game Boy and Game Boy Color titles. The Game Boy Micro did not make much of an impact in the video game market, as it was overshadowed by the Nintendo DS, which also played Game Boy Advance games through the GBA cartridge slot.

== Reception ==
Upon its North American release, IGN praised the Game Boy Advance's graphical capabilities and battery life, but criticized the system's shoulder button placement and noted the system's high price tag which "may be a tad bit too high to swallow", ultimately scoring the Game Boy Advance with an "8.0" out of 10. They also pointed out the system's lack of a backlight which occasionally got in the way of playing games. ABC News praised the Game Boy Advance's graphics, grip, and larger screen, stating that "You've never had as much fun playing old games."

Reviewing for CNET, Darren Gladstone scored the system with a 7.0 out of 10, praising its graphical performance and backward compatibility, but being considerably critical of the system's lack of a backlit screen, noting that it makes it "nearly impossible" to play in normal lighting conditions. Gladstone ultimately recommended the sleeker and backlit Game Boy Advance SP instead, despite noting that the cheaper price of the original model may "appeal to gamers on a lower budget."

=== Sales ===
Nintendo hoped to sell 1.1 million Game Boy Advance units by the end of March with the system's Japanese debut, and anticipated sales of 24 million units before the end of 2001; many marketing analysts believed this to be a realistic goal due to the company's lack of major competition in the handheld video game market. Within the first week of its North American launch in June, the Game Boy Advance sold 500,000 units, making it the fastest-selling video game console in the United States at the time. In response to strong sales, Nintendo ordered 100,000 units to ship to retail stores, hoping to ship another half million of them by the end of June. The Game Boy Advance also became the fastest-selling system in the United Kingdom, selling 81,000 units in its first week of release and beating the PlayStation 2's previous record of 20,000 units. In 2004, the system's sales in the United Kingdom surpassed one million units.

On December 1, 2006, Nintendo of America released launch-to-date information indicating that the company had sold 33.6 million units of the Game Boy Advance series in the United States. In a Kotaku article published on January 18, 2008, Nintendo revealed that the Game Boy Advance series had sold 36.2 million units in the United States, as of January 1, 2008. As of December 31, 2009, 81.51 million units of the Game Boy Advance series have been sold worldwide, 43.57 million of which are Game Boy Advance SP units and 2.42 million of which are Game Boy Micro units.

== See also ==
- Visteon Dockable Entertainment
