= Afterburner (modification kit) =

Modification for the Game Boy Advance

The Afterburner is an internal front-lighting system for the Game Boy Advance handheld video game console manufactured by Triton Labs and released in mid-2002. Installing the Afterburner required disassembling the device, removing some plastic from the interior of the case, attaching the lighting mechanism to the screen, and soldering two wires to the motherboard for power. Users could optionally add a potentiometer or an integrated circuit to adjust the light’s brightness. While installing the kit voided the system’s warranty, demand for the accessory surged during the 2002 holiday season, and the company had trouble keeping up with demand for the accessory during the 2002 holiday season.

The Afterburner was discontinued following the release of the Game Boy Advance SP, which featured a similar built-in lighting system.
