= Game Boy Game Pak =

Video game cartridge

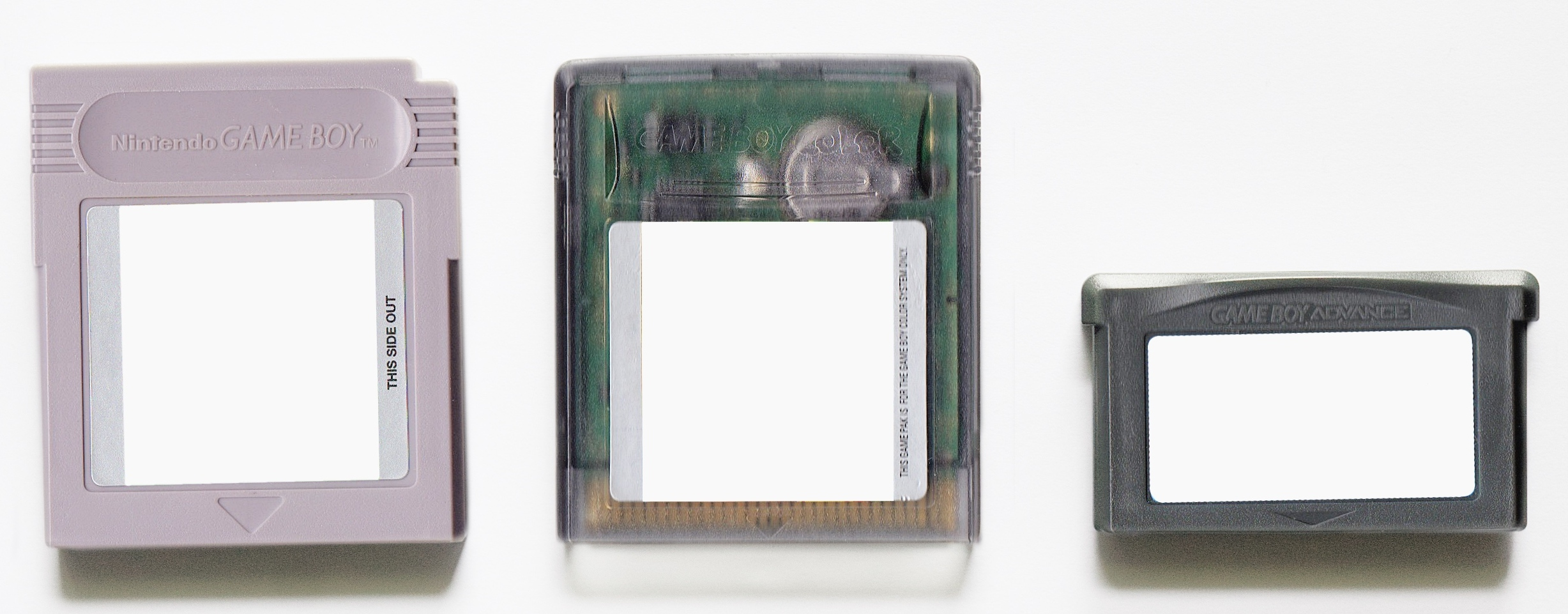
- Game Boy Game Paks from left to right: original, Color, Advance
- Media type: ROM cartridge
- Encoding: Digital
- Capacity: Original: ROM: 32 KB-4 MB, RAM: 8-128 KB; Color: ROM: 128 KB-8 MB, RAM: up to 128 KB; Advance: ROM: 4-32 MB, RAM: up to 128 KB
- Standard: Proprietary
- Developed by: Nintendo
- Dimensions: Original/Color: 65.5 × 57 × 7.5 mm (2.58 × 2.24 × 0.30 in); Advance: 35 × 57 × 7.5 mm (1.38 × 2.24 × 0.30 in)
- Usage: Game Boy; Game Boy Pocket; Game Boy Color; Game Boy Advance; Nintendo DS
- Released: Original: April 21, 1989; Color: October 21, 1998; Advance: March 21, 2001
- Discontinued: Original/Color: 2006; Advance: 2012

Game Boy Game Pak (Note: Known in Japan as Cartridge (カートリッジ, Kātorijji)) is the brand name of the ROM cartridges used to store video game data for the Game Boy family of handheld video game consoles, part of Nintendo's line of Game Pak cartridges. Early Game Boy games were limited to 32 kilobytes (KB) of read-only memory (ROM) storage due to the system's 8-bit architecture. Nintendo later incorporated a memory bank controller into cartridges to allow for more storage by switching between ROM banks. This change allowed Game Paks to eventually reach 8 megabytes (MB) of storage, allowing for more complex games.

In addition to ROM, cartridges could also include random-access memory (RAM) chips that could be used for increased performance or to save game progress. A battery in the cartridge would keep the RAM powered when the Game Boy was off. Later cartridges could also include real-time clock functionality that could keep track of time even when the device was off or a Rumble Pak to add vibration feedback to enhance gameplay.

Game Paks for the Game Boy Advance, which uses a 32-bit architecture, could accommodate up to 32 MB of game ROM. The Game Boy Advance was the last major handheld device to use cartridges as its primary storage format. Later systems, like the Nintendo DS and Nintendo 3DS, use game cards, which are similar to SD cards.

== Background ==
=== Original and Color ===
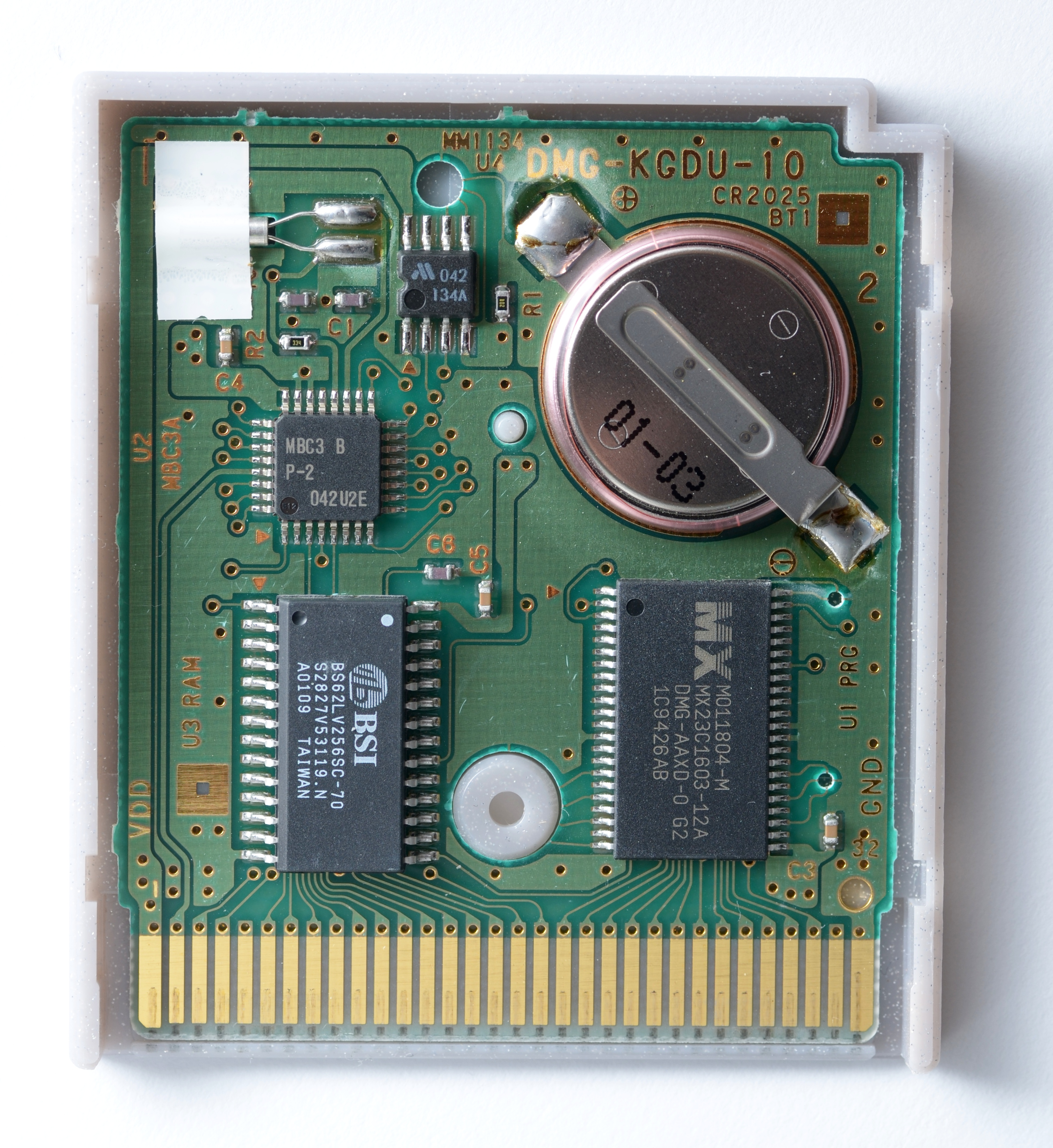
Game Boy Game Pak board. Clockwise from top right: battery, ROM chip, SRAM chip, MBC chip, crystal oscillator (under white tape) for real-time clock, and supervisor chip. (Annotated version)

The Game Boy Game Pak cartridges store the game's code and data using ROM chips. However, the original Game Boy's 8-bit architecture limited the CPU's access to just 32 KB of ROM at a time, restricting early games to this size.

Nintendo overcame this limitation with a chip called the memory bank controller (MBC) placed within the cartridge. A similar solution had been previously used on the Nintendo Entertainment System Game Pak. The MBC chip banks the second half of the ROM ($4000-$7FFF) with the first half ($0-$3FFF) usually fixed; this portion contains the CPU vectors and core game routines. While the NES typically used a separate graphics ROM to store game graphics as raw data, the Game Boy used the more conventional setup of storing the graphics in compressed format in the main ROM; the game engine must unpack graphics data and copy it to video RAM as needed. The more varied banking options NES mappers offered such as 8k and 32k granularity were not available on the Game Boy.

While the Game Boy had no territorial lockout as the main Nintendo consoles did, games were required to run a check routine to prevent the use of unlicensed cartridges—the Game Boy logo that is displayed at power on was a graphic reading "NINTENDO" that Nintendo required to be stored in the ROM of all games. A small boot loader ROM would scan for the presence of the graphic and refuse to boot unless it was a pixel-perfect copy of the graphic contained in the boot ROM. While this system was not hard to evade, Nintendo were concerned less with the technical than legal aspects of it—they decided that they could sue a game publisher for unauthorized trademark use if they put the logo in a cartridge and displayed it on screen. However some developers found workarounds to pass the boot check without actually displaying the Nintendo logo and a small number of unlicensed Game Boy cartridges did get released.

Using this technology, Nintendo was able to create cartridges that used up to 8 MB of ROM, vastly expanding game size and complexity. Cartridges for the original Game Boy range from 32k to up to 512k in size, while standard sizes for Game Boy Color cartridges are between 1MB and 4MB.

Some Game Boy cartridges included random-access memory (RAM) usually for save game RAM. This memory typically came in the form of an 8 KB EEPROM chip, a 32 KB SRAM chip, or later, a 128 KB flash memory chip. SRAM chips required a battery to retain data when the Game Boy was powered off. These batteries had a limited lifespan and needed to be desoldered for replacement. The SRAM chips were later phased out in favor of Flash memory chips, which can store data without the need for a battery. Later revisions introduced even more functionality. Real-time clock capabilities kept track of time using a crystal oscillator. Rumble Pak cartridges added vibration feedback to enhance gameplay.

The standard cartridge measured 5.8 centimeters (2.3 in) wide and 6.5 centimeters (2.6 in) high. However, some games, such as the Game Boy Camera, boasted custom-designed, larger casings to accommodate special features. On the original Game Boy a plastic tab slid across into a notch at the top of the cartridge when the console was powered on. To save space, this locking mechanism was removed from all subsequent devices. The notch was not present on Game Boy Color Game Paks to prevent them from being used in the original Game Boy. If these Game Boy Color Game Paks were inserted into a Game Boy Pocket or Light, an error message would be shown on the screen.

=== Advance ===
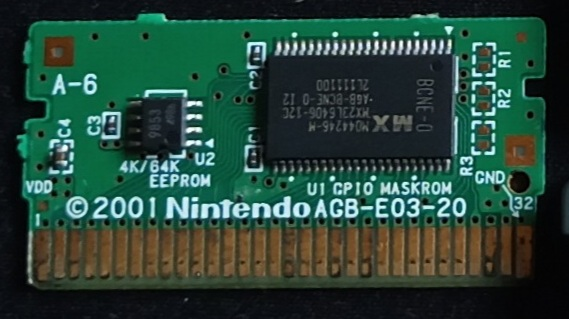
Game Boy Advance Game Pak board. Includes EEPROM chip (left) and ROM (right)

The Game Boy Advance used a significantly shorter standard cartridge design at 3.5 centimeters (1.4 in) high. The top of the cartridge was wider at 6 centimeters (2.4 in) wide to prevent insertion into older Game Boy devices, but the bottom retained the same width of 5.8 centimeters (2.3 in).

The Game Boy Advance Game Pak could accommodate up to 32 MB of game ROM, although special Game Boy Advance Video cartridges could hold 64 MB of video on ROM. Standard ROM sizes were 4MB, 8MB, 16MB, and 32MB.

Cartridges could also include RAM, however these were mostly used to save game progress and not to increase the device's performance. This memory typically came in the form of an 4 or 64 KB EEPROM chip, a 256 or 512 KB SRAM chip, or later, a 512 KB or 1 MB flash memory chip. SRAM chips required a battery to retain data when the Game Boy was powered off. These batteries had a limited lifespan and needed to be desoldered for replacement.

The Game Boy Advance Game Pak also had a notch on a bottom rear corner. When inserted into a Game Boy Advance, this notch avoided pressing a switch (called a shape detector) within the slot, allowing the device to boot into its native mode. When an older Game Boy Game Pak was inserted, this switch would be depressed, triggering the device to boot into its backward compatibility mode.

The Nintendo DS retained backward compatibility with Game Boy Advance cartridges but not older Game Boy games. To accomplish this, the shape detector was replaced with a solid piece of plastic, preventing older Game Boy cartridges from being inserted.

== Types ==
Excluding game-specific variations, there are four types of cartridges compatible with Game Boy systems:

=== Original Game Boy Game Pak ===
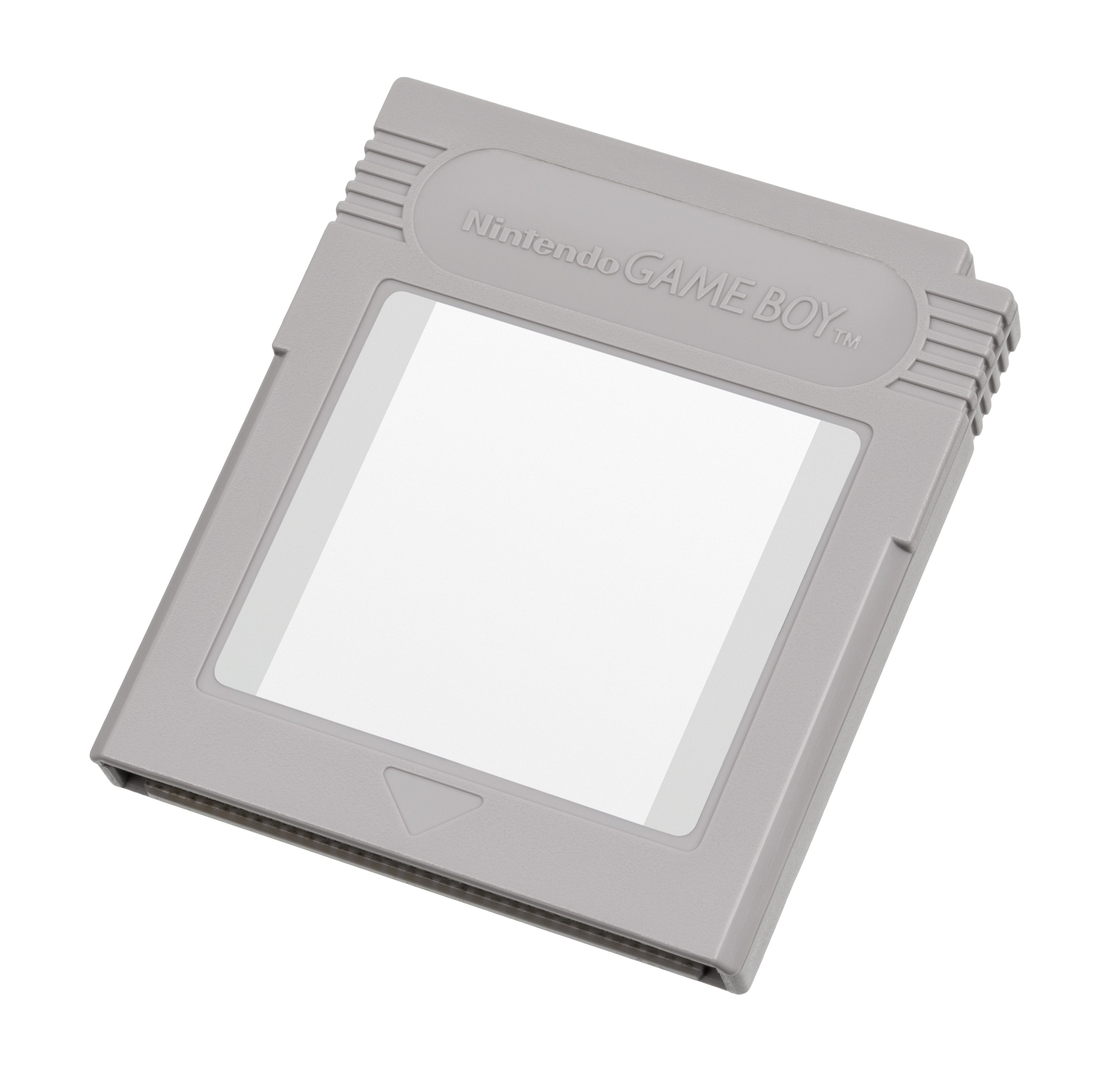
Original Game Boy Game Pak

The original Game Boy Game Pak (also known as class A or grey cartridges) is compatible with all Game Boy systems, excluding Game Boy Micro. All original Game Boy games are of this type. The games on these cartridges are programmed in monochrome (using four shades of grey or green).

When these games are played on the Game Boy Color and subsequent systems, the device applies a limited color palette (typically dark green) using four to ten colors to enhance games originally intended to be presented in four shades of gray. Many games were programmed to call for a default color palette. However, for games without a default, users could choose from 12 different palettes using button combinations. A dedicated palette option replicates the original Game Boy's grayscale experience.

Additionally, a limited number of cartridges released between 1994 and 1998 feature enhancements compatible with the Super Game Boy.

Although most original Game Boy Game Paks were encased in grey plastic, some used special colors that match the game's theme, including notably, Pokémon Red, Blue, and Yellow and the Donkey Kong Land series, which utilized yellow cartridges.

=== Color-enhanced Game Boy Game Pak ===
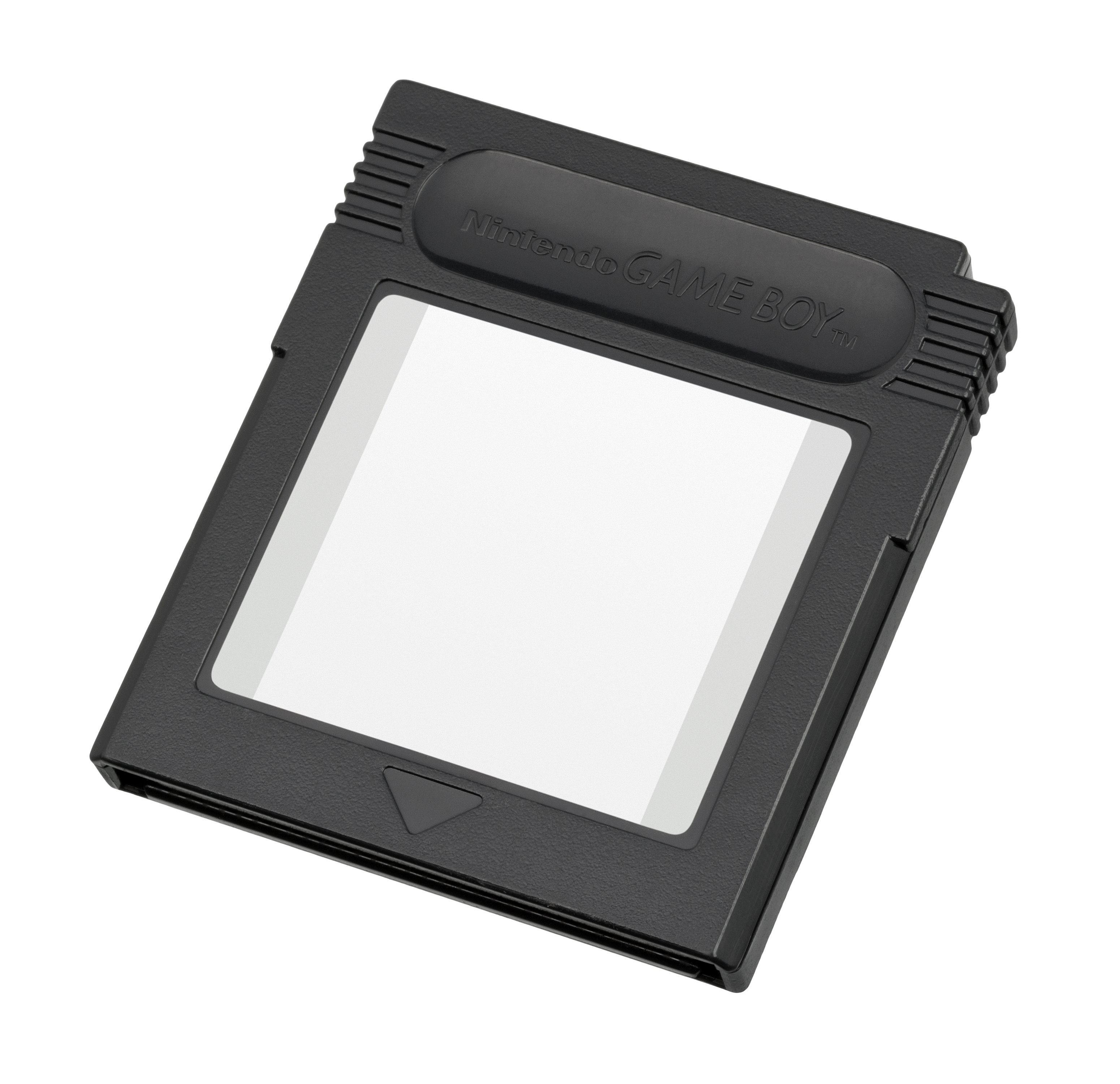
Color-enhanced Game Boy Game Pak

The color-enhanced Game Boy Game Pak (also known as class B, dual mode, or black cartridges) improved the gameplay experience on the Game Boy Color and subsequent systems while maintaining compatibility with older monochrome devices.

These cartridges can use the full color capabilities of the Game Boy Color and subsequent systems, displaying up to 56 colors simultaneously out of a palette of 32,768 while remaining compatible with the original Game Boy where they were presented in four shades of gray. However, this compatibility comes at the expense of not being able to utilize the handheld's increased processing speed and memory.

Some color-enhanced games, like Wario Land II and The Legend of Zelda: Link's Awakening DX, were colorized re-releases of originally monochrome games; however, Nintendo insisted that developers include gameplay enhancements (beyond simply adding color) to differentiate the games from their monochrome counterparts. Some color-enhanced cartridges also boasted features later seen in clear cartridges, such as the Rumble Pak in Pokémon Pinball and infrared communications in Robopon.

Although most color-enhanced Game Boy Game Paks were encased in black plastic, some used special colors that matched the game's theme, including notably Pokémon Yellow and Pokémon Gold and Silver.

=== Game Boy Color Game Pak ===
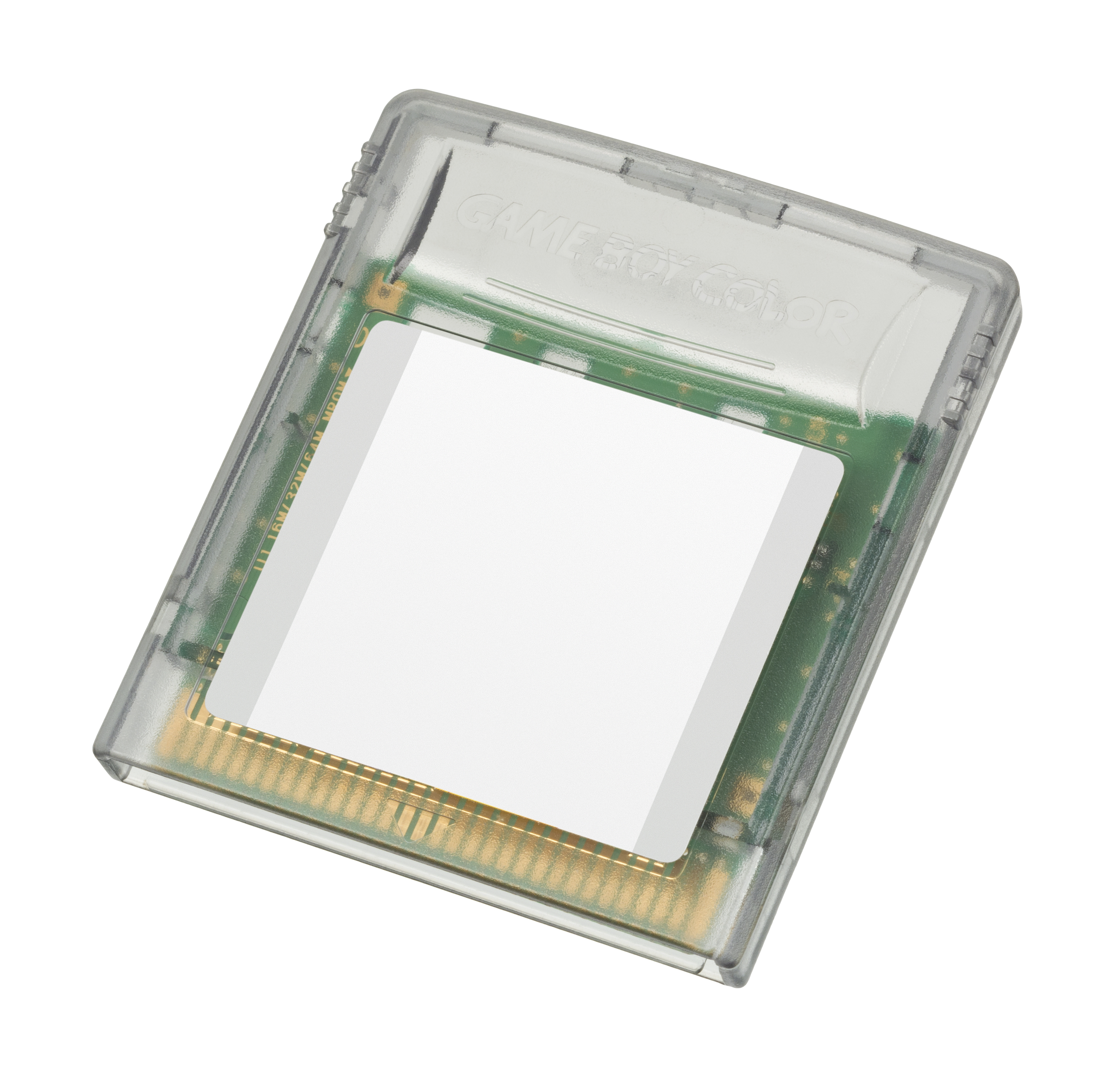
Game Boy Color Game Pak

The Game Boy Color Game Pak (also known as class C or clear cartridges) introduced unique features for players on the Game Boy Color and subsequent systems. They boast a wider color range (up to 56 colors) and benefit from the increased processing speed and memory introduced with the Game Boy Color. Because of this reliance on the newer hardware, these games could be physically inserted into but are incompatible with the older monochrome Game Boy models. They lacked the notch in the top-right corner, and thus physically prevented the power switch of a monochrome Game Boy from being turned on when one was inserted.

Certain cartridges also had additional features to enhance gameplay, including rumble feedback, utilized in Perfect Dark, and tilt sensors, employed in Kirby Tilt 'n' Tumble.

Most original Game Boy Game Paks were encased in translucent plastic, but similar to previous generations, some were released in special colors that match the game's theme, like Pokémon Crystal.

=== Game Boy Advance Game Pak ===
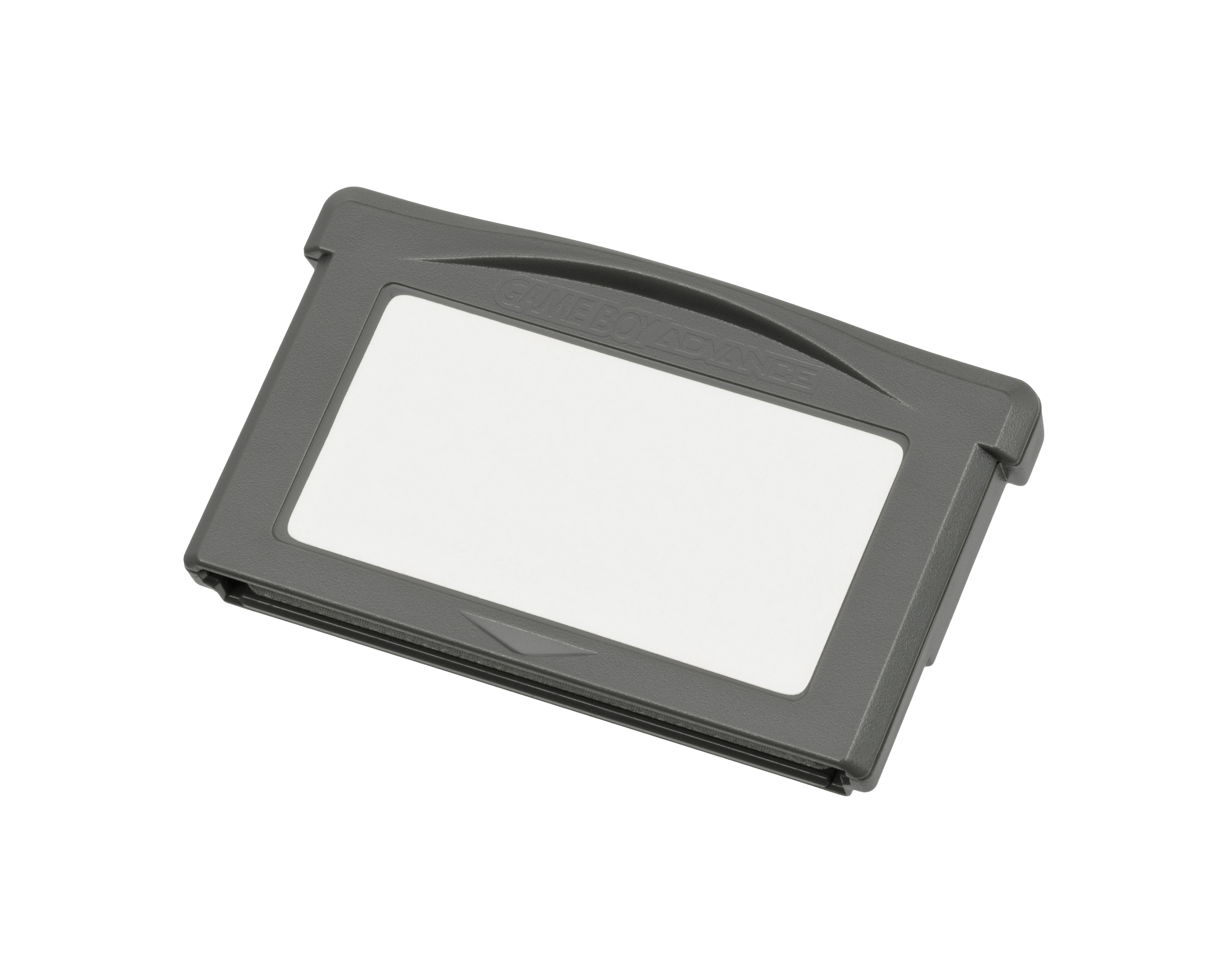
Game Boy Advance Game Pak

The Game Boy Advance Game Pak (also known as class D cartridges) is half the size of all earlier cartridges and is compatible with Game Boy Advance and later systems, including the Nintendo GameCube (via Game Boy Player) and Nintendo DS.

Some Advance cartridges have built-in features, including rumble features (Drill Dozer), tilt sensors (WarioWare: Twisted!, Yoshi's Universal Gravitation) and solar sensors (Boktai).

Although most Game Boy Advance Game Paks were encased in dark grey plastic, some used special colors that matched the game's theme, including Pokémon Ruby and Sapphire, Emerald and FireRed and LeafGreen.
