= Play-Yan =

Game Boy Advance SP media player

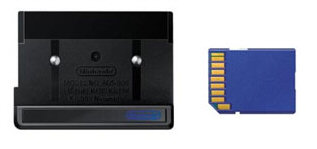
Play-Yan

The Play-Yan (trademarked PLAY-YAN) is a media player designed for the Game Boy Advance SP and also compatible with the Game Boy Micro and Nintendo DS. It uses SD flash memory to play MP3 audio files and H.264/MPEG-4 AVC video files. It can also play 13 bonus mini-games, all of which are available freely on the Nintendo website in Japan. Sales of the Play-Yan were discontinued on September 11, 2005.

An updated version, the Play-Yan Micro (trademarked PLAY-YAN micro), known as the Nintendo MP3 Player in Europe, was released two days later alongside the similarly branded Game Boy Micro, with features such as MP4 and ASF support built directly into the hardware. Play-Yan Garage Games are not supported in the Play-Yan Micro. The Nintendo MP3 Player does not support MP4 playback and features a slightly altered user interface.

== History ==
The Play-Yan launched in Japan on February 21, 2005 for approximately 5,000 yen (US$47.47). Nintendo originally planned to release the adapter in the United States by the end of 2005, but ultimately was not released in North America. Nintendo did, however, release the micro version in Europe as the Nintendo MP3 Player, and since the Play-Yan (and its successor the Play-Yan Micro) is region-free, it can be imported to other regions and played on any Game Boy Advance. Play-Yan was released in China by iQue under the name of MP4 Player for GBA.

It is an MP3 and MPEG-4 player add-on for the Game Boy Advance SP, Nintendo DS, DS Lite, and Game Boy Micro. Music and video files stored on an SD memory card can be loaded into a slot on the right side of the Play-Yan, which resembles a Game Boy Advance game cartridge. Due to its power requirement, use with an original Game Boy Advance system is not recommended. The Play-Yan is loaded directly into the Game Boy Advance game slot of a compatible system. While the original Game Boy Advance is compatible, its non-illuminated screen and the Play-Yan's high rate of power consumption do not make the Game Boy Advance a very suitable platform. The Play-Yan is also compatible with the Game Boy Player, but compressed video does not play back as nicely on a television screen as it does on a small, portable screen. Therefore, the Game Boy Player is a somewhat unsuitable platform as well, at least compared to any standard DVD player.

The adapter has its own integrated headphone port, but uses the parent console's power supply, controls, and display. The Play-Yan is advertised as offering sixteen hours of MP3 playback and four hours of MPEG-4 playback on a fully charged Game Boy Advance SP. In addition to multimedia playback, the Play-Yan offers support for mini-games, which could be downloaded from Nintendo of Japan's website.

== Games ==
1. Avoid (2005)
2. Bat (2005)
3. Credit (2005)
4. Fire (2005)
5. Fish (2005)
6. Insect (2005)
7. Jump (2005)
8. Keeper (2005)
9. Memory (2005)
10. Nekoroid (2005)
11. Nose (2005)
12. Triple (2005)
13. Wave (2005)

== Play-Yan Micro ==
To accompany the September 13, 2005, release of the Game Boy Micro in Japan, Nintendo released an updated version of the original Play-Yan called the Play-Yan Micro for 5,000 yen. The new version is compatible with all the same systems, and it looks and works the same as the original, but there are a few noticeable differences. The Play-Yan Micro has the added functionality of MP4 and ASF playback, and it has an updated user interface and improved sound quality through its headphone port. Minigame support, however, was removed from the Play-Yan Micro. The Play-Yan Micro was only available through Nintendo of Japan's online store, and for an additional 1,000 yen, it came with a computer application on CD called "MediaStage Ver. 4.2 for Nintendo" for managing music and video files on a PC, a version of the software of the same name by Panasonic.

== Appearances in the other games ==
The stick figure seen in the Play-Yan's interface also appears in the Japan-only GBA game Rhythm Tengoku, and its arcade version, in the rhythm game Night Walk. It was later used as a visualization in the Nintendo 3DS's Sound feature. The character also made cameo appearances in Rhythm Heaven, has physically reappeared in the Nintendo 3DS game Rhythm Heaven Megamix, and made another cameo appearance in the Nintendo Switch game Rhythm Heaven Groove.
