= Visteon Dockable Entertainment =

Portable DVD player/game console hybrid

Dockable Entertainment featuring Game Boy Advance
- Manufacturer: Visteon
- Type: Video game console
- Lifespan: NA: July 2006
- Media: Cartridge, DVD, CD
- CPU: ARM7TDMI, 16.78 MHz
- Controller input: Visteon Wireless Game Controller; Game Boy Advance

The Visteon Dockable Entertainment System (Note: officially referred to as Dockable Entertainment featuring Game Boy Advance) is a portable DVD player with the secondary function of operating as a Game Boy Advance handheld video game console. Licensed by Nintendo, it was manufactured by Visteon and released in 2006 for the US market at an MSRP of $1300 USD.

== Background ==
The player is notable for containing officially licensed Game Boy Advance hardware, as Visteon partnered with Nintendo to announce the product at CES 2006. Initially due out in April, the product was then delayed to May before finally launching in July of that year.

The device was not sold at general retailers, but rather at car dealerships in combination with a roof docking head mount for installation, or already equipped in select models of certain vehicles.

On April 1, 2008, Visteon introduced a model mounted into headrests for $1699. Later that year the company expressed interest in creating similar products for the Nintendo DS and Wii platforms, though neither materialized.

== Hardware specifications ==
The most common roof-mountable version is based on the Visteon XV101 portable DVD player, and shares specifications in all aspects except those regarding Game Boy Advance compatibility.

- 10.2" Flip Down LCD
- 6-Pin Auxiliary Port
- Infrared Port
- DVD Drive
- Game Boy Advance Cartridge Slot

Alongside this, the player came with a wireless game controller (a modified Sky Active gamepad), a set of wireless headphones, a remote control, and compatibility with MP3 and WMA CD files.

Unique to the headrest model was a 7" TFT LCD, backlit DVD controls plus an additional remote, headphone and game controller.
