= Game Boy Micro =

Handheld game console by Nintendo

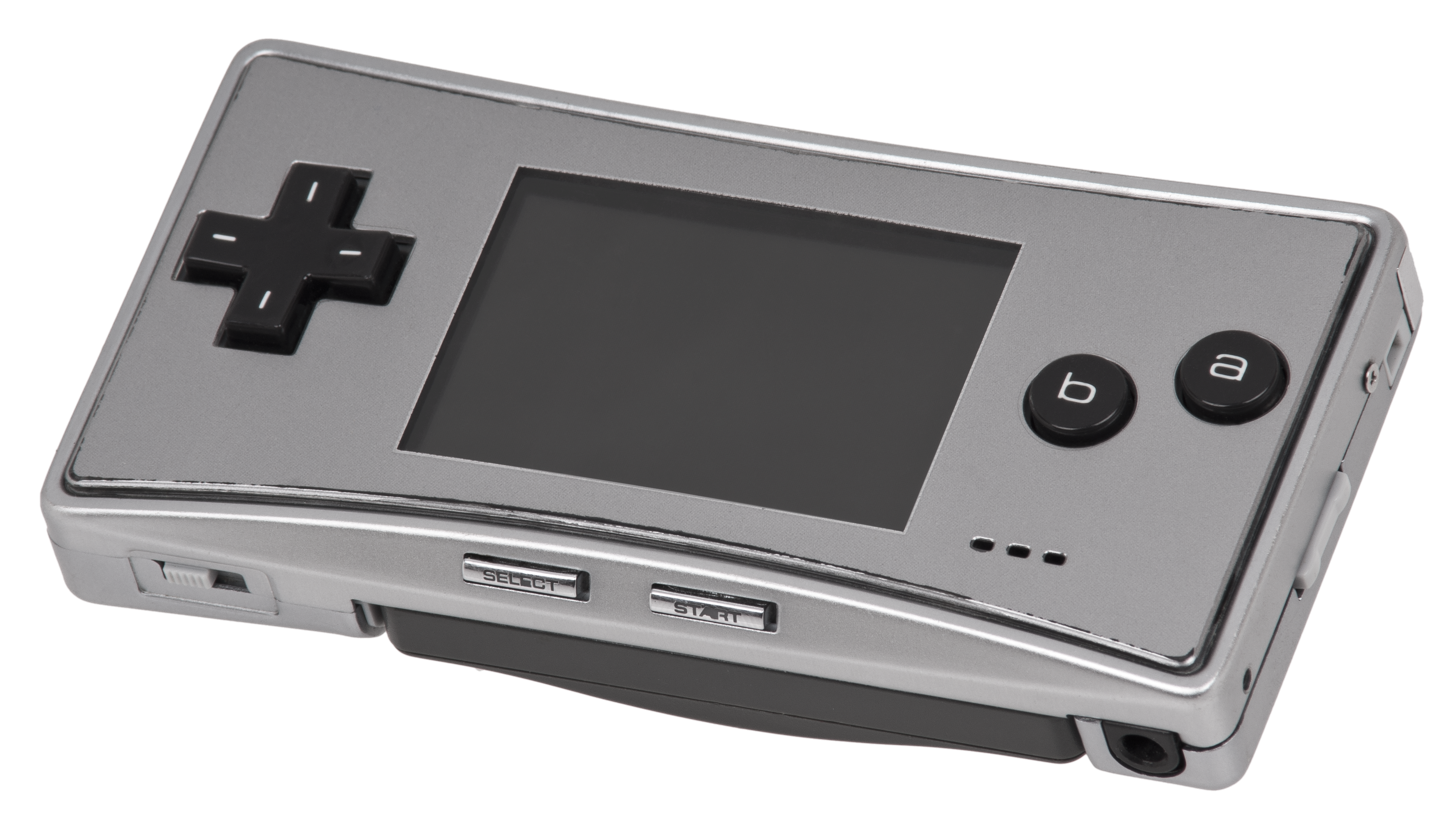
- A Silver Game Boy Micro with cartridge inserted
- Also known as: Oxy (code name)
- Developer: Nintendo Research & Engineering
- Manufacturer: Nintendo
- Product family: Game Boy
- Type: Handheld game console
- Generation: Sixth
- Released: September 13, 2005: JP: September 13, 2005; NA: September 19, 2005; CHN: October 1, 2005; AU: November 3, 2005; EU: November 4, 2005
- Introductory price: US$99.99 (equivalent to $160 in 2025)
- Discontinued: 2008
- Units shipped: 2.42 million
- Media: Game Boy Advance Game Pak
- System on a chip: Nintendo CPU AGB
- CPU: ARM7TDMI @ 16.78 MHz
- Memory: 288 KB RAM, 98 KB Video RAM
- Predecessor: Game Boy Color
- Successor: Nintendo DS
- Related: Game Boy Advance; Game Boy Advance SP

The Game Boy Micro (Note: ゲームボーイミクロ (Japanese: Gēmu Bōi mikuro)) is a handheld game console developed and marketed by Nintendo. It was released in Japan on September 13, 2005, and in other regions later that year. A miniaturized version of the Game Boy Advance, it was the last in the Game Boy line. Unlike other Game Boy Advance models, the Micro lacks backward compatibility for original Game Boy and Game Boy Color games. It failed to meet Nintendo's sales expectations, having sold about 2.4 million units worldwide.

== History ==
According to the Nintendo of America vice president, George Harrison, a smaller version of the Game Boy was first discussed in 2004. Harrison explained that, unlike the traditional console development process, Nintendo was always thinking about new ideas for the Game Boy, describing it as a "continuous process of invention". Developed under the code name "Oxy", Nintendo tried many ways to see how small they could make the Game Boy. They opted for a metallic casing that the company president, Satoru Iwata, said was unusual for Nintendo.

The Game Boy Micro was announced by Nintendo of America's vice president of sales and marketing, Reggie Fils-Aimé, at the Electronic Entertainment Expo press conference on May 17, 2005. It was released in Japan on September 13, 2005, North America on September 19, 2005, Australia on November 3, 2005, and Europe on November 4, 2005. It was released in China as the iQue Game Boy Micro on October 1, 2005, and released in South Korea on November 9, 2005. The Game Boy Micro was discontinued in 2008, two years before the Game Boy Advance SP was discontinued.

== Design and specifications ==
The Game Boy Micro retains some of the functionality of the Game Boy Advance SP but in a more compact form. Additionally, it has a backlit screen with the ability to adjust the brightness, and several internal metal plates to keep its shape. The shape is oblong, similar to the Nintendo Entertainment System controller. The Game Boy Micro features a removable, decorative housing called a faceplate. Designs with special faceplates were sold as a customization feature. Faceplates for the Micro are made using in-mould decoration.

The Game Boy Micro cannot play original Game Boy and Game Boy Color games due to design changes. While the 8-bit Sharp SM83 processor, necessary to run games from older Game Boy systems, is still present, it lacks other internal hardware necessary for backward compatibility. It is also incompatible with other peripherals due to its design.

- Dimensions: 50 by 101 by 17.2 millimetres (1.97 in × 3.98 in × 0.68 in)
- Weight: 80 grams (2.8 oz)
- Processor: 32-bit 16.8 MHz ARM processor (ARM7TDMI)
- Screen: 2 inches (diagonal) backlit with adjustable brightness
- Resolution: 240×160 pixels
- Framerate: 60 Hz
- Colors: 512 (character mode) or 32,768 (bitmap mode)
- Battery: built-in rechargeable lithium-ion battery, up to 5 hours of battery life with top brightness and sound or 8 hours with both features on default
- Headphones: 3.5mm jack

The Game Boy Micro has a two-way switch on its right side for adjusting volume. By holding down the left shoulder button, the switch can also be used to adjust the backlight between five levels of brightness.

=== Software and hardware ===
The Game Boy Micro is compatible only with Game Boy Advance Game Paks, including Game Boy Advance Video Paks. As with other Game Boy Advance systems, there is no regional lockout on software.

While Game Boy or Game Boy Advance Game Link cables and the Game Boy Advance Wireless Adapter are not compatible with the Game Boy Micro system, adapters and a Game Boy Micro-compatible Wireless adapter have been released. Nintendo also redesigned their Play-Yan music/video adapter to better fit the Game Boy Micro. This device is able to play MP3 and digital video files from SD cards.

== Packaging ==
In Japan, the Game Boy Micro was released in four different base colors: black, blue, purple, and silver. Also available at launch was a limited-edition version, based on the controller of the Family Computer. In October 2005, Square Enix announced that they would be releasing a special faceplate, featuring artwork by Yoshitaka Amano, to promote their re-release of Final Fantasy IV on the Game Boy Advance. On November 17, 2005, Nintendo released a Pokémon version in Japan, featuring a red Micro with a black faceplate containing the silhouette of Pikachu. Another special edition of the Micro was released in Japan on April 20, 2006, which bundled Mother 3 with a red Micro and a themed faceplate.

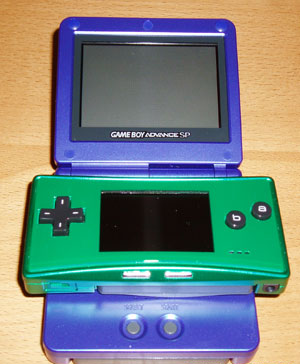
Comparing the size of Game Boy Micro and Game Boy Advance SP

In the United States and Canada, the Game Boy Micro launched with two regular color choices, each sold with three interchangeable faceplates included: silver with black, "Ammonite" and "Ladybug" faceplates; and black with silver, "Flame" and "Camouflage" faceplates. The "20th Anniversary" edition was released on December 4, 2005, which was the Famicom controller-inspired version released in Japan. In Europe, the Game Boy Micro was available in four different colors, with one matching faceplate: silver, green, blue and pink. Game Boy Micro sold in Australia have the same colors (except green which replaced by red color) as Europe.

Aside from Nintendo of America's online store, additional faceplates were not sold in the US, and were entirely unavailable in the UK. The feature was omitted from the product's marketing, packaging, and manual in Europe.

== Release and sales ==
Cumulative number of units shipped (in millions)
Date	Japan	Americas	Other	Total
Q3 2005	0.41	0.29	0	0.70
Q4 2005	0.57	0.47	0.78	1.82
Q1 2006	0.58	0.47	0.79	1.83
Q2 2006	0.59	0.47	0.80	1.86
Q3 2006	0.59	0.47	0.80	1.87
Q4 2006	0.60	0.96	0.85	2.40
Q1 2007	0.61	0.95	0.87	2.42

Generally, the Game Boy Micro did not sell well, and failed to reach the company's target number of units sold. The Game Boy Micro sold over 170,000 units during its first days in Japan. According to a Q1 2007 Nintendo earnings release, 2.42 million Game Boy Micro units had been sold worldwide as of March 31, 2007, including 610,000 units in Japan, 950,000 units in the Americas, and 870,000 in other territories such as Europe and Oceania. As of July 30, 2007, the Game Boy Micro had sold 2.5 million units, according to GamePro. It was ranked #8 in their "The 10 Worst-Selling Handhelds of All Time". Iwata stated that the marketing of the Nintendo DS may have hurt the Micro, and said Game Boy Micro sales did not meet Nintendo's expectations.

The system retailed for US$99, compared to US$79 for the Game Boy Advance SP. The system was originally available in black and silver, and a red 20th Anniversary Edition was later released to commemorate the 20th anniversary of the Nintendo Entertainment System.

== Reception ==
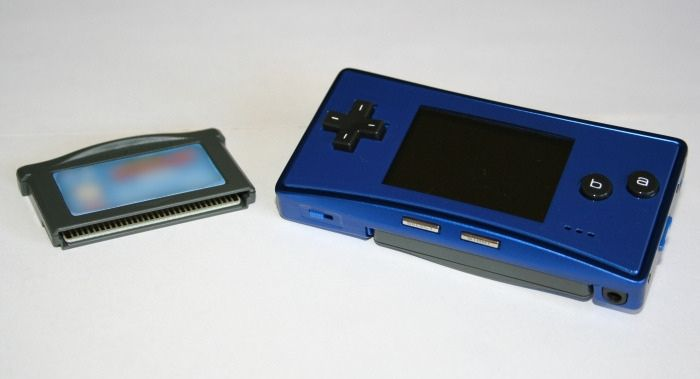
A blue Game Boy Micro next to a Game Boy Advance cartridge

The Game Boy Micro's backlit screen, which is superior to the original frontlit Game Boy Advance SP model (a later backlit remodel added a similar high-quality screen to SP systems), has been praised for its visibility. Due to a finer dot pitch, the screen is more evenly lit, and the brightness is adjustable. The smaller dot pitch has also improved the apparent sharpness of the display.

The removable faceplates have also been praised because they allow for personalization and protect the high-resolution backlit screen.

== See also ==
- Wii Mini and Nintendo Switch Lite, similar compact Nintendo gaming systems
