= Nintendo video game consoles =

List of video game consoles by Nintendo

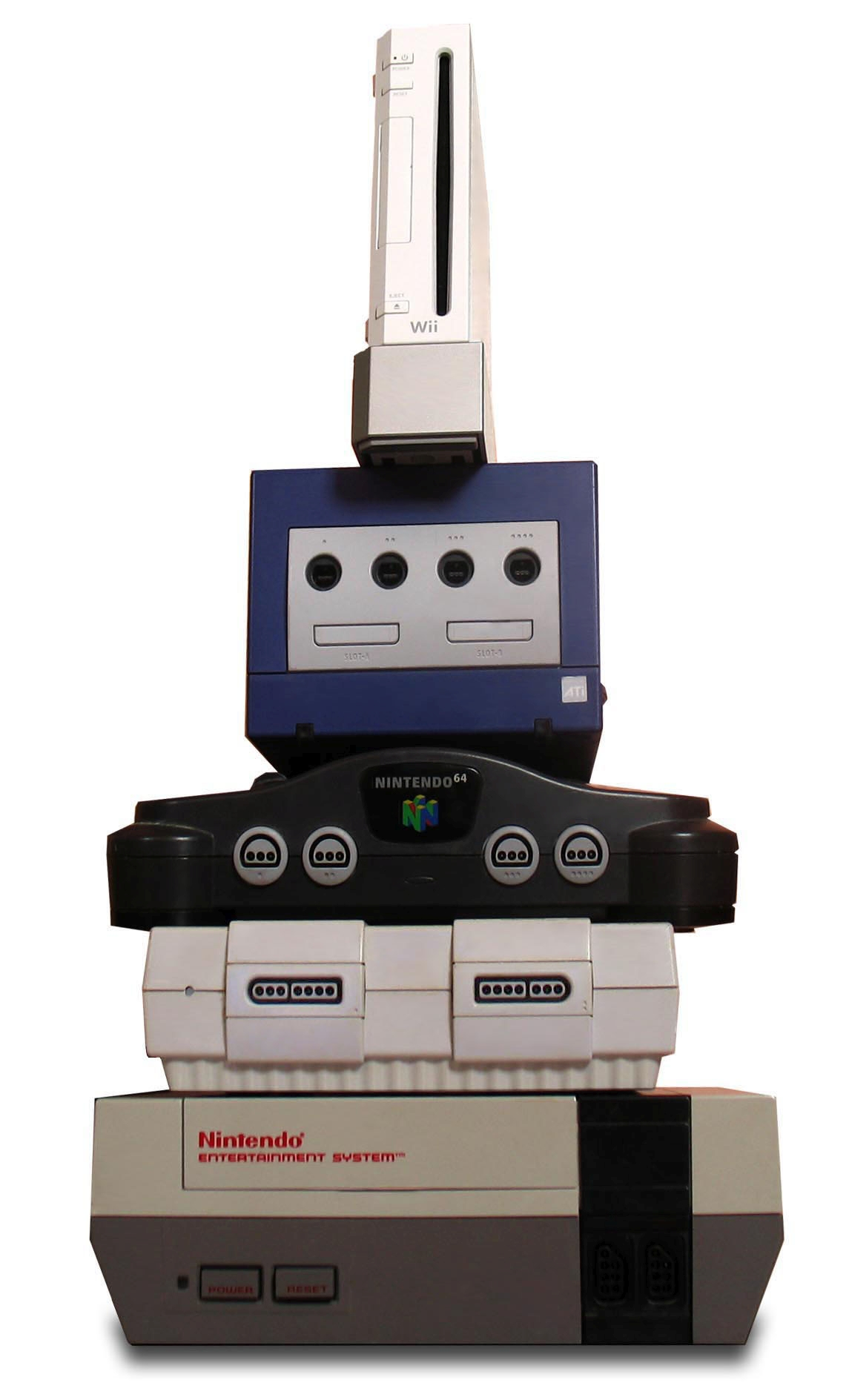
- Home consoles size comparison of the (top to bottom) Wii (2006), GameCube (2001), Nintendo 64 (1996), North American SNES (1991) and the NES (1985)
- Product type: Video game console
- Current owner: Nintendo
- Country: Japan
- Introduced: June 1, 1977; 49 years ago
- Markets: Worldwide
- Website: nintendo.com

Nintendo has developed eight home video game consoles and multiple portable consoles for use with external media, as well as dedicated consoles and other hardware for their consoles. As of September 30, 2026, Nintendo has sold over 991.09 million hardware units.

The company's first console, the Color TV-Game, was a success in Japan but was never released in other territories. Their first systems to achieve worldwide success were the Game & Watch handheld series, before achieving greater worldwide success with the Nintendo Entertainment System (NES), originally released as the Family Computer (Famicom) in Japan in 1983. The NES restarted the video game industry after the video game crash of 1983, and was an international success. In 1989, Nintendo released the Game Boy, which became the first handheld console to sell in large numbers. In the early 1990s, Nintendo's market lead began to decrease; although the 1990 Super Nintendo Entertainment System (SNES) was a strong seller, the Sega Genesis was a very strong contender. Nintendo and Sega would both lose a significant portion of the console market towards the end of the 1990s, as Sony's PlayStation became the most popular console, beating the Nintendo 64, though Nintendo managed to sell more than Sega Saturn.

The Dreamcast, released in 1998, PlayStation 2, released in 2000, and Microsoft's Xbox, released in 2001, would eventually relegate Nintendo to third place in the international market, despite the release of the GameCube. However, they retained their lead in the handheld console market, with the Game Boy Color and Game Boy Advance models. Towards the middle of the 2000s, Nintendo introduced the first successful handheld device with a touch screen (DS) and the first successful console designed for motion controlled inputs (the Wii); they became some of the best-selling consoles of all time. In 2011, Nintendo became the first major company to release a handheld game console with stereoscopic 3D capabilities, with the 3DS, which had very strong sales from the beginning. The Wii U, released in November 2012, was much less successful, and sales were significantly lower than predicted. The Nintendo Switch, by contrast, was released in March 2017 and has become the company's best-selling console and overall second best-selling console of all time. A successor, the Nintendo Switch 2, was released on June 5, 2025.

== Home consoles ==
=== Color TV-Game (1977–1980) ===
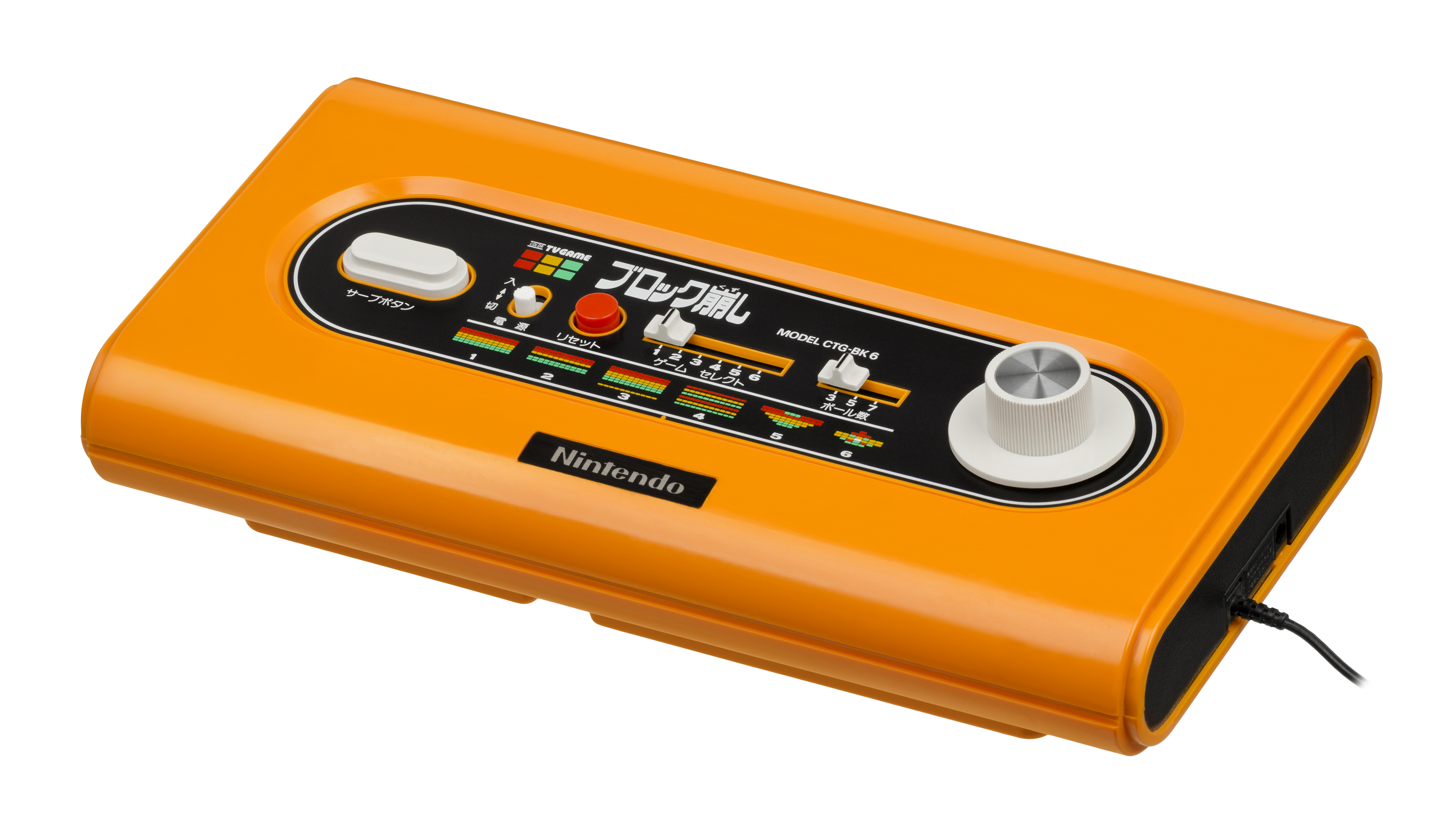
Color TV-Game Block Breaker

Color TV-Game is a series of five dedicated home consoles released only in Japan. Each of the consoles contained a small number of games and a built-in controller. In total, approximately 3 million units were sold.

The Color TV-Game series consists of:

- Color TV-Game 6, released June 1, 1977 with six variations of Pong: Tennis, Hockey, and Volleyball in Singles or Doubles mode. Approximately one million units sold.
- Color TV-Game 15, released June 8, 1977 with 15 variations of Pong. This was the most popular console in the series, selling just over one million units.
- Color TV-Game Racing 112, released June 8, 1978 with one racing game. Notable for being the first Nintendo project that Shigeru Miyamoto worked on. Approximately five hundred thousand units sold.
- Color TV-Game Block Breaker, released April 23, 1979 with one game based on Breakout. Approximately five hundred thousand units sold.
- Computer TV-Game, released December 12, 1980 with Computer Othello. Few units sold.

=== Family Computer and Nintendo Entertainment System (1983 and 1985) ===
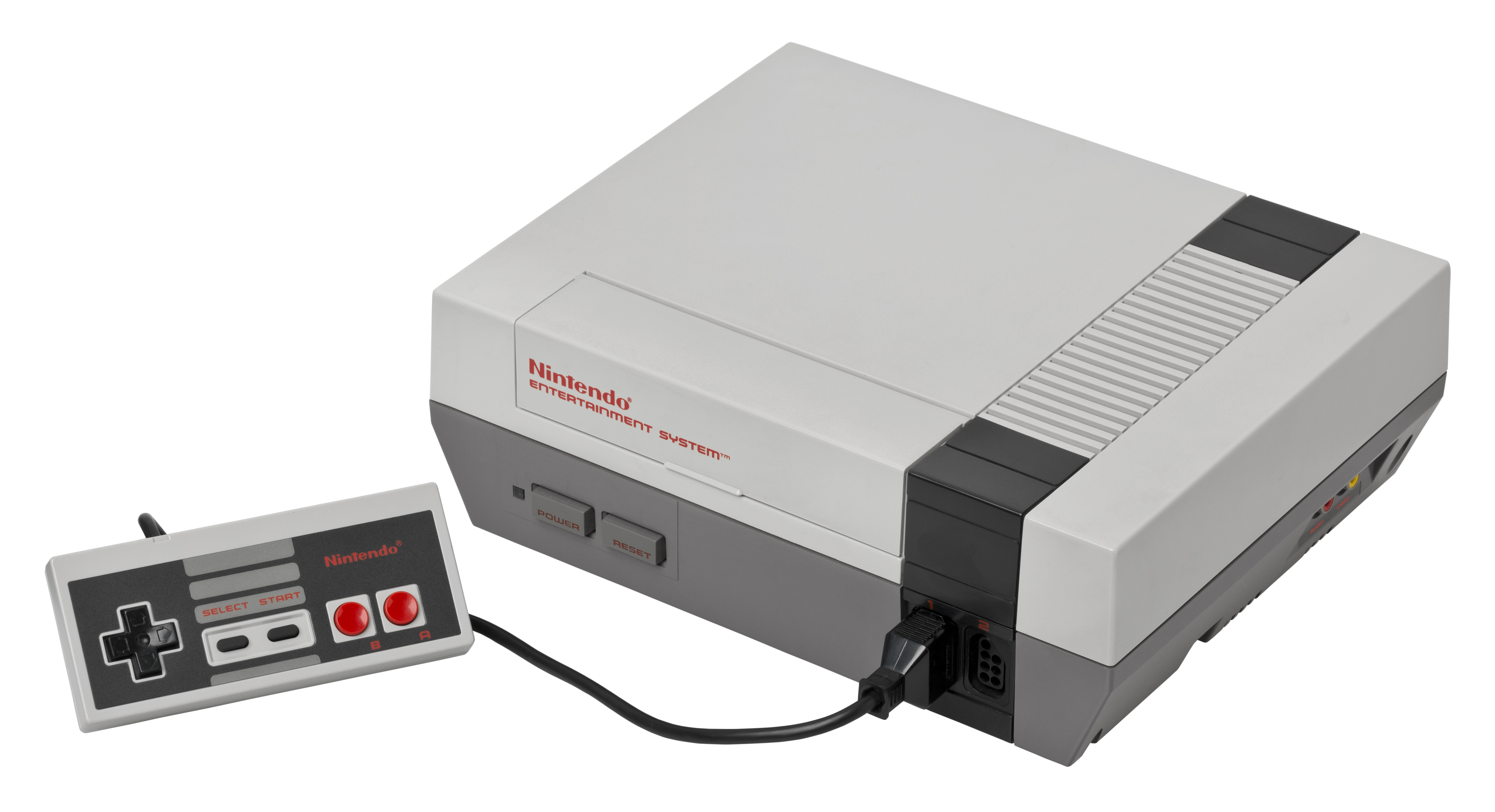
Nintendo Entertainment System

The Nintendo Entertainment System (NES) is an 8-bit home video game console. It was first released in Japan on July 15, 1983, as the Family Computer (Famicom) and would become Nintendo's first home video game console released outside Japan. It was released in US test markets as the redesigned NES on October 18, 1985 and fully launched in North America on September 27, 1986. The NES was distributed in South America, Europe, Asia, Oceania, and Africa throughout the 1980s under various names.

Selling 61.91 million units worldwide, the NES helped revitalize the video game industry following the video game crash of 1983, and set the standard for subsequent consoles in everything from game design to business practices. The NES was the first console for which the manufacturer openly courted third-party developers. The console also launched many of Nintendo's most iconic franchises, such as The Legend of Zelda and Metroid. Nintendo continued to repair Famicom consoles in Japan until October 31, 2007, attributing the decision to discontinue support to an increasing shortage of the necessary parts.

Nintendo released a software emulation-based version of the Nintendo Entertainment System on November 10, 2016. Called the NES Classic Edition, it is a dedicated console that comes with a single controller and 30 preloaded games.

=== Super Famicom and Super Nintendo Entertainment System (1990 and 1991) ===
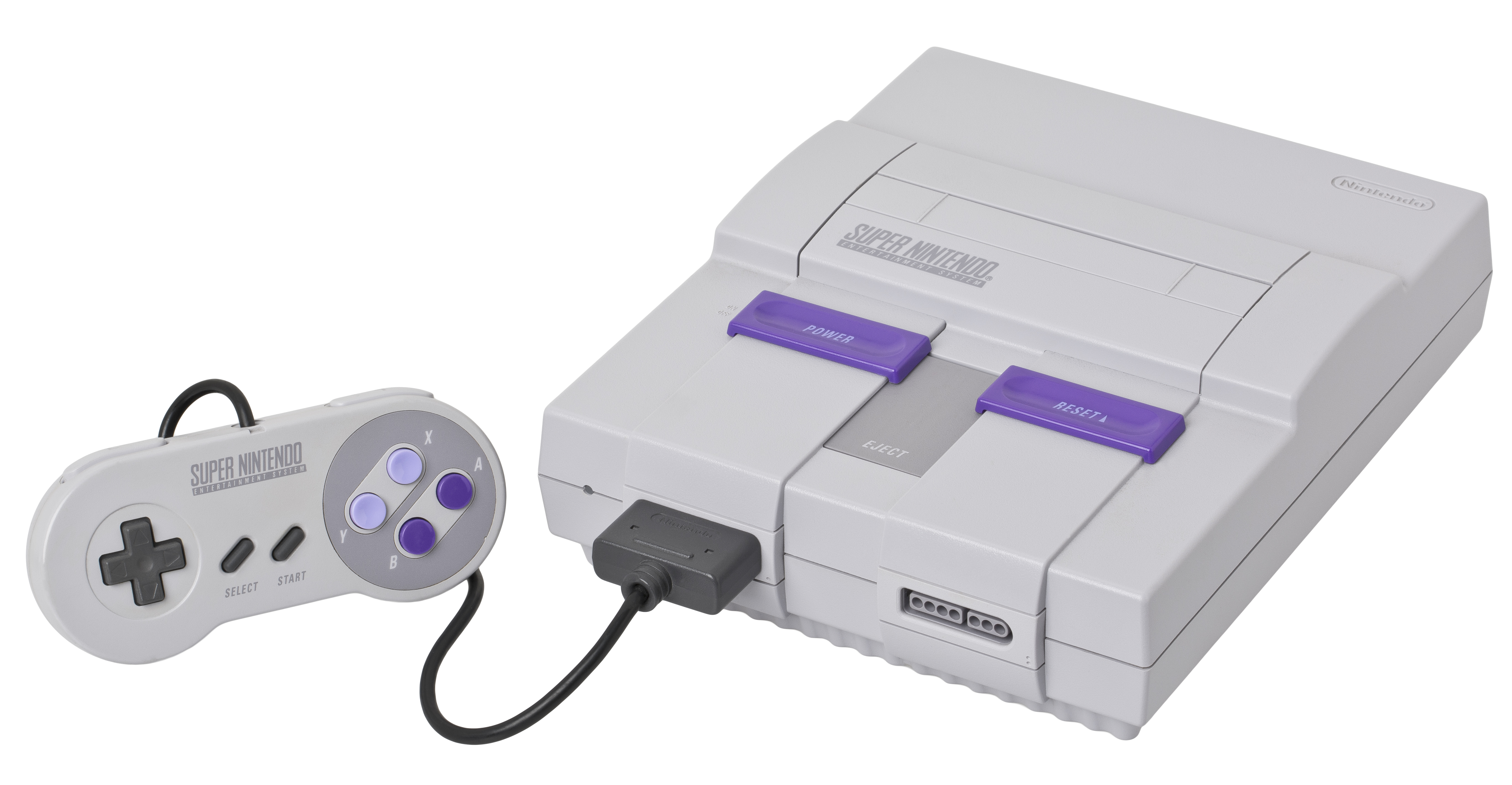
Super Nintendo Entertainment System (North America design)

The Super Nintendo Entertainment System (SNES), colloquially shortened to Super Nintendo, is a 16-bit home video game console that was released in 1990 in Japan, 1991 in North America, 1992 in Europe and Oceania, and 1993 in South America. It was first released in Japan on November 21, 1990, where it is known as the Super Famicom. In South Korea, it is known as the Super Comboy and was distributed by Hyundai Electronics. In Europe, the console retained the US name, but unlike the NES, used the Japanese-style casing.

The SNES is Nintendo's third home console (second outside of Japan), following the Nintendo Entertainment System. Whereas the earlier console had struggled in the PAL region and large parts of Asia, the SNES was a global success, albeit one that could not match its predecessor's popularity in Northeast Asia and North America—due in part to increased competition from Sega's Genesis console. Despite its relatively late start, the SNES became the bestselling console of the 16-bit era, selling 49.10 million systems worldwide. The SNES library is known for upgrading some of Nintendo's most famous franchises, and making the games even more critically acclaimed, such as Super Metroid, The Legend of Zelda: A Link to the Past, Final Fantasy IV and VI, Kirby Super Star, Donkey Kong Country, and Super Mario World, as well starting some popular franchises such as Star Fox and Mega Man X.

Similarly to the NES Classic Edition released prior, Nintendo released a software-emulation-based version of the Super Nintendo Entertainment System on September 29, 2017. Called the Super NES Classic Edition, it, like its predecessor, is a dedicated console that comes with two controllers and 21 preloaded games, one of which, Star Fox 2, is a title originally developed for the system that went unreleased.

=== Nintendo 64 (1996) ===
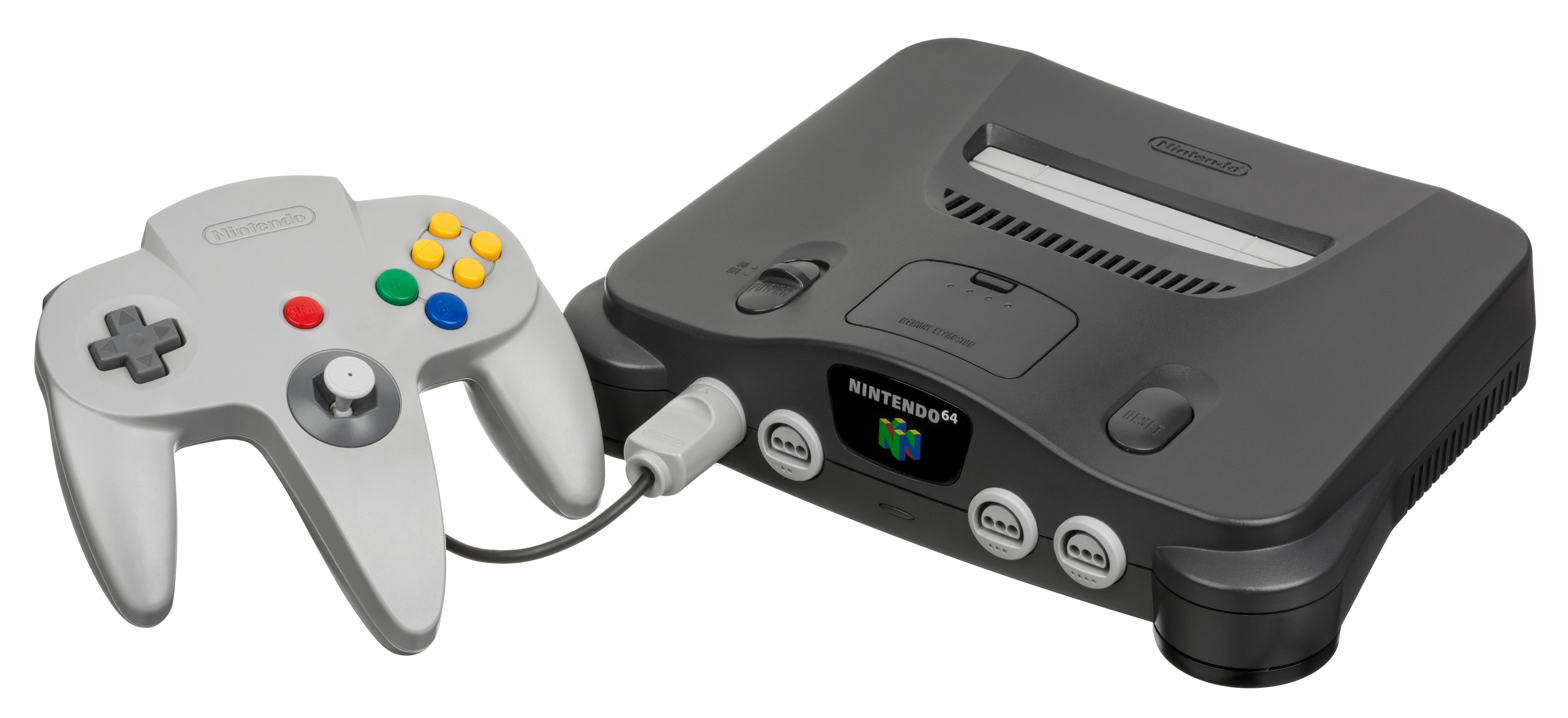
Nintendo 64

The Nintendo 64 (N64), is a 64-bit home video game console released on June 23, 1996 in Japan, September 29, 1996 in North America, and March 1, 1997 in Europe and Australia. The Nintendo 64 was Nintendo's third home video game console for the international market. It was released with three launch games in Japan (Super Mario 64, Pilotwings 64, and Saikyo Habu Shogi) and two in North America (Super Mario 64 and Pilotwings 64). PAL regions also had three launch titles (Super Mario 64, Shadows of the Empire and Pilotwings 64) with Turok: Dinosaur Hunter delayed until three days after launch. Other key games included Donkey Kong 64, Diddy Kong Racing, Banjo-Kazooie, two games in The Legend of Zelda series, GoldenEye 007, Kirby 64: The Crystal Shards, Mario Kart 64, Super Smash Bros., and Star Fox 64. The Nintendo 64 sold 32.93 million systems.

=== GameCube (2001) ===
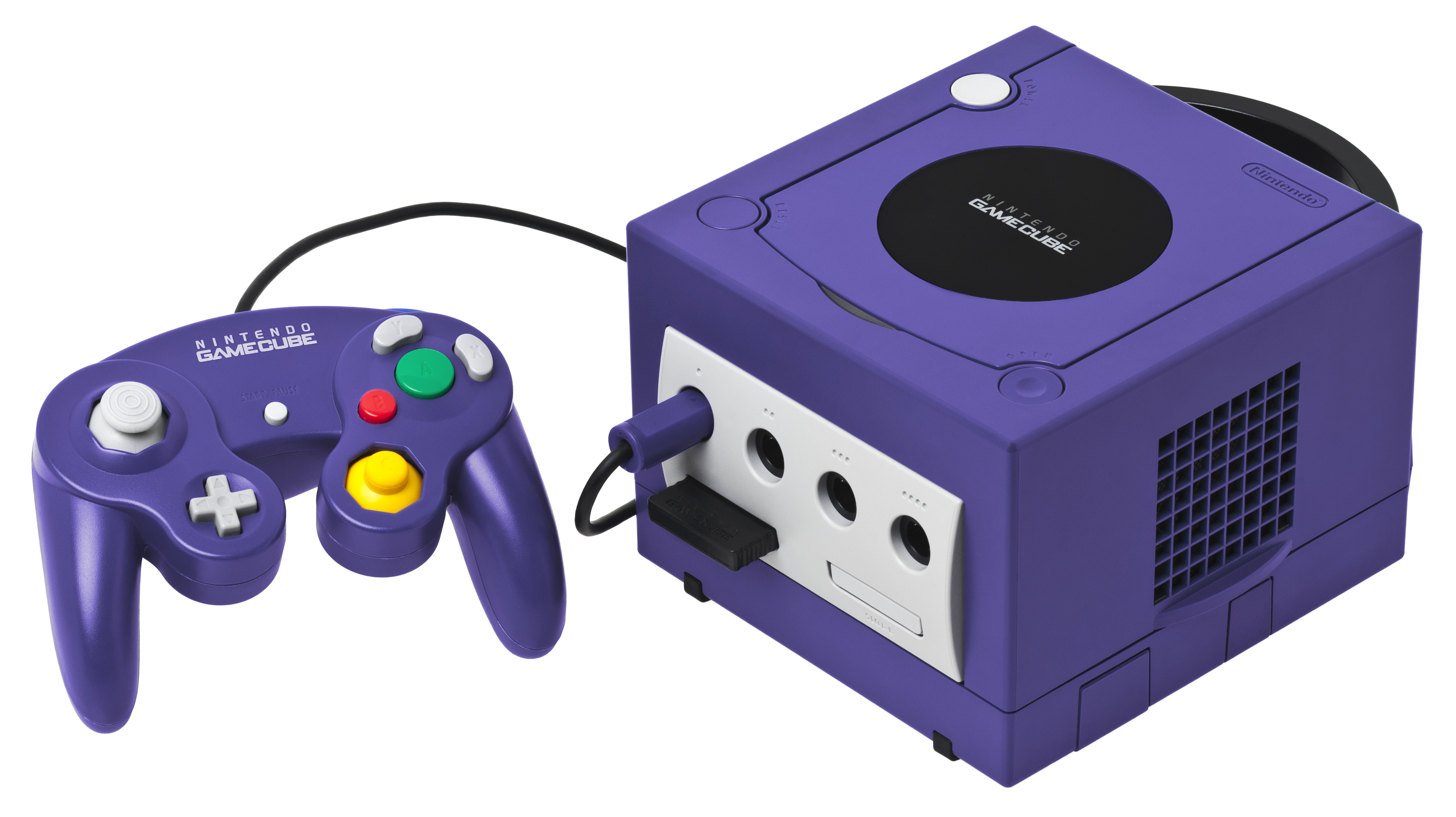
GameCube

The GameCube was released on September 14, 2001 in Japan, November 18, 2001 in North America, May 3, 2002 in Europe, and May 17, 2002 in Australia. It is Nintendo's sixth generation home video game console, the same generation as Sega's Dreamcast, Sony's PlayStation 2, and Microsoft's Xbox. Until the console's unveiling at Space World 2000, the design project was known as Dolphin—this can still be seen in the console and its accessories' model numbers. The GameCube is the most compact sixth generation console. The GameCube is Nintendo's first game console to use optical discs rather than game cartridges. An agreement with the optical drive manufacturer Matsushita led to a DVD-playing GameCube system named the Panasonic Q, which was only released in Japan on December 14, 2001. Much of Nintendo's core line-up centered on sequels to their established hit franchises such as Super Mario Sunshine, Super Smash Bros. Melee, The Legend of Zelda: Wind Waker, Metroid Prime, Pokémon Colosseum, Kirby Air Ride, and Star Fox Adventures, while new franchises like Animal Crossing and Pikmin were born, although the former franchise had seen a Japan-exclusive release on the N64. The GameCube has sold 21.74 million units.

=== Wii (2006) ===
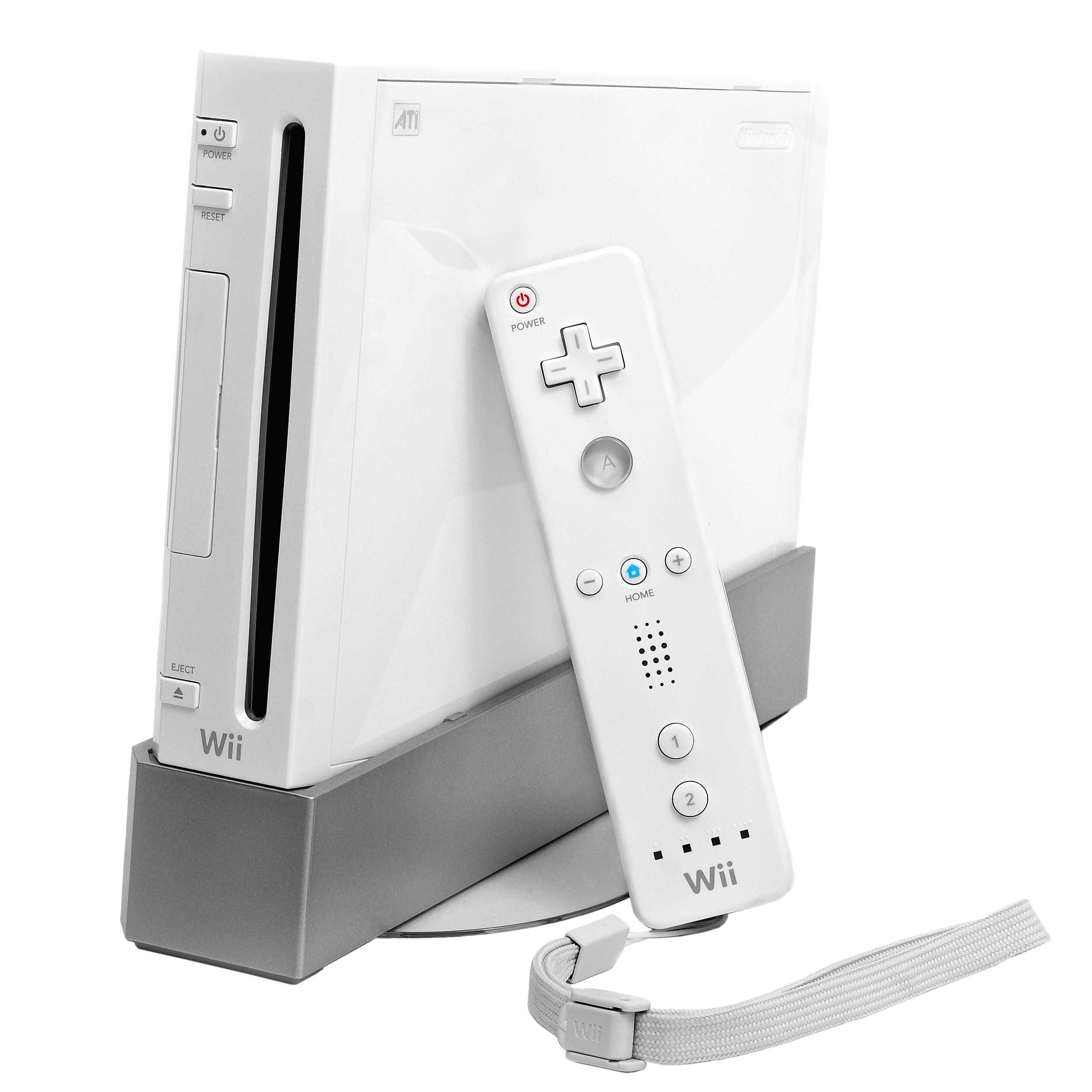
Wii console (left) and Wii Remote (right)

Nintendo released the Wii on November 19, 2006 in North America, December 2, 2006 in Japan, December 7, 2006 in Australia, and the following day in Europe, as their seventh generation home video game console. Nintendo designed the console to appeal towards a wider audience than those of its main competitors, the PlayStation 3 and Xbox 360, including "casual" players and audiences that were new to video games.

These aims were emphasized by the console's distinguishing feature, the Wii Remote—a handheld motion controller that can detect motion and rotation in three dimensions, using a mixture of internal sensors and infrared positioning. The controller includes an expansion port that can be used to connect other accessories, such as the Nunchuk—an attachment with an analog stick and additional buttons, a "Classic Controller" gamepad providing a traditional control scheme, and Wii MotionPlus—an accessory designed to enhance the motion detection capabilities of the original Wii Remote models.

The Wii's internal hardware is an updated derivative of that of the GameCube; in comparison to its seventh-generation competitors, the Wii had lower overall graphics capabilities, and does not output in high-definition. The Wii also featured internet-enabled features; the Nintendo Wi-Fi Connection service allowed supported games to offer online multiplayer and other features, while the WiiConnect24 feature allowed messages and updates to be downloaded while the console was in standby. Through Wii Shop Channel, additional games and apps could be downloaded or purchased for the console, including Virtual Console—a selection of classic video games emulated from older consoles. That service has been discontinued as of January 30, 2019. Early models of the Wii also had backwards compatibility with GameCube games and controllers, but this was dropped from later hardware revisions, namely the Wii Family Edition and the Wii Mini.

The Wii was a major success for Nintendo; in April 2007, the Wall Street Journal declared that Nintendo had "become the company to beat in the games business", citing the success of the Wii and the portable Nintendo DS line. As of March 31, 2016, the Wii has sold 101.63 million consoles worldwide. Wii Sports—a collection of sports minigames that were designed to leverage the Wii Remote, was bundled with the console outside of Japan, and had a major cultural impact as the console's "killer app" among the mainstream audience.

=== Wii U (2012) ===
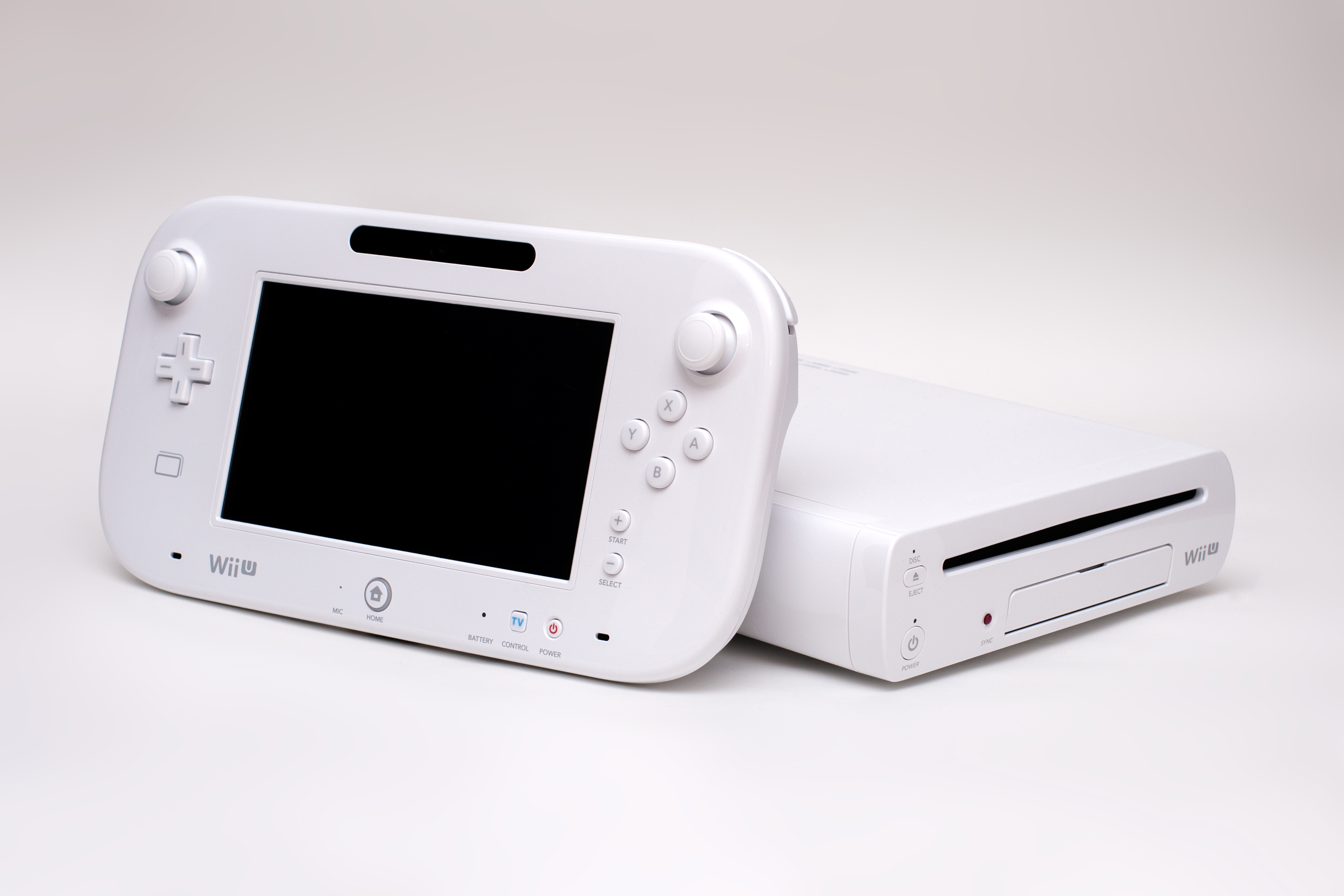
Wii U GamePad (left) and Wii U console (right)

The Wii U was released on November 18, 2012 in North America, November 30, 2012 in Europe and Australia, and December 8, 2012 in Japan, as a direct successor to the Wii, and the first entry in the eighth generation of home video game consoles. The Wii U's distinguishing hardware feature is the GamePad, a tablet-like controller which contains a resistive touchscreen that wirelessly streams a video output from the console. The GamePad's display can be used to provide alternative or complementary perspectives within a game, or as the main display instead of a television. In particular, Nintendo promoted the concept of "asymmetric" multiplayer, where a player with the GamePad would have a different objective and perspective than that of other players. Alongside the GamePad, the Wii U supports Wii controllers and games. A conventional gamepad known as the Wii U Pro Controller was also released.

The Wii U featured more-extensive online functionality than the Wii, using the Nintendo Network platform; as with the Wii, it supported online multiplayer and downloading and purchasing new games and apps, but also allowed video chat. It previously featured an internal social network known as Miiverse, which allowed users to write and draw posts in game-specific communities, the service was discontinued on November 8, 2017. Players of today can still participate in online usage of Wii U programs through an online service known as "Pretendo", also being available for the 3DS family of systems. Nintendo also attempted to provide second screen experiences for television programming for the Wii U through a feature known as Nintendo TVii, but it was discontinued outside of Japan in August 2015. Unlike the Wii, the Wii U's hardware is capable of high-definition graphics.

The Wii U was met with low adoption, attributed by Nintendo executives to a lack of third-party support; poor marketing of the system, which led to a lack of clarity of the Wii U game pad from being a tablet device; and the subsequent release of the PlayStation 4 and Xbox One the following year. However, some critics argued that the Wii U still had advantages over PS4 and Xbox One, including its lower cost and notable early exclusives such as Super Mario 3D World. Sales steadily increased following the release of several notable first-party exclusives, including new entries in the Mario Kart and Super Smash Bros. franchises, and the new franchise Splatoon.

On January 31, 2017, a Nintendo spokesperson stated that production of the console had ended, with 13.56 million units sold worldwide.

== Handheld consoles ==
=== Game & Watch (1980–1991) ===
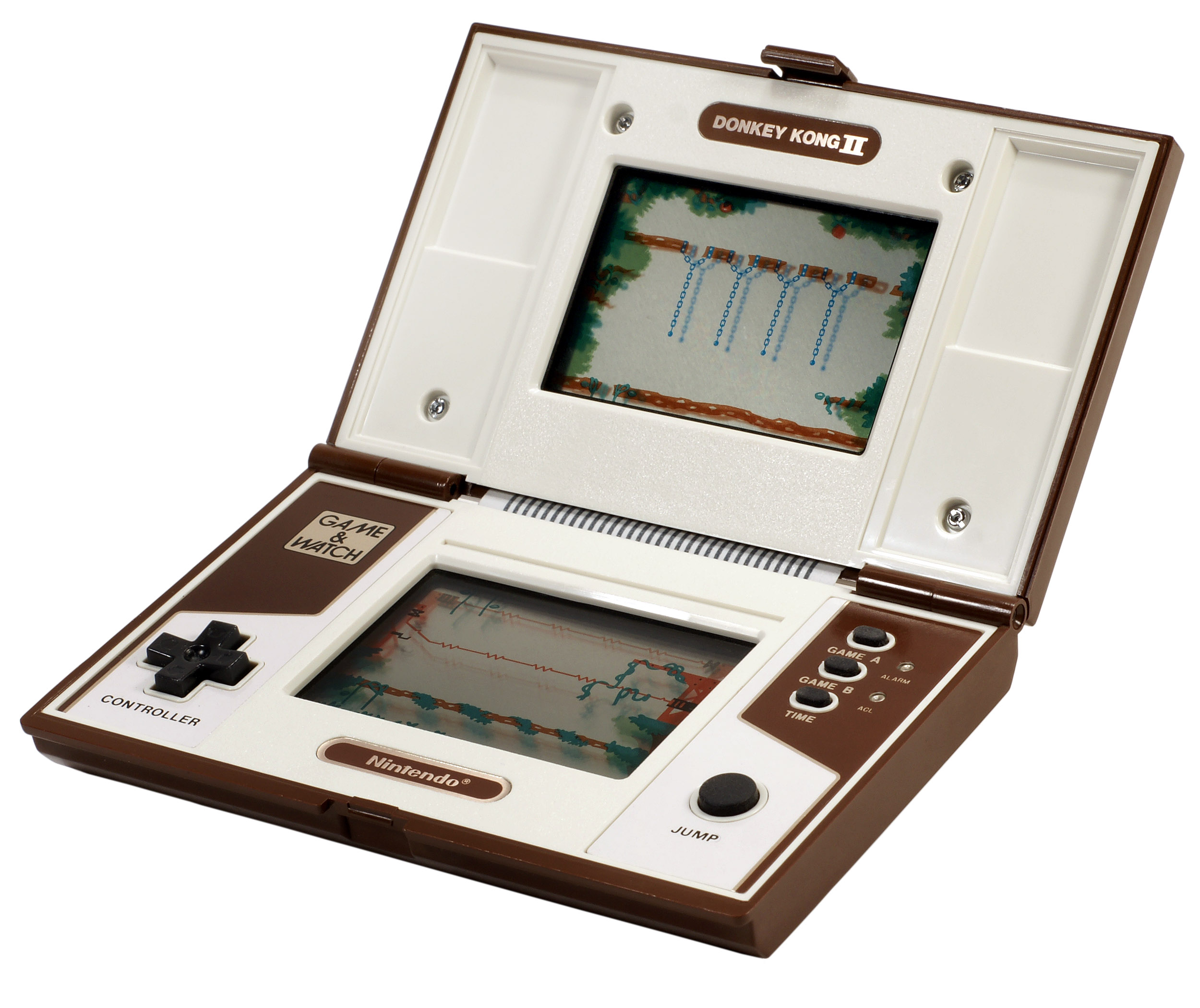
A Game & Watch with Donkey Kong 2 as pre-installed game

The Game & Watch series of handheld electronic games made by Nintendo and created by its game designer Gunpei Yokoi from 1980 to 1991. Each featured a single game that could be played on a segmented LCD screen, in addition to a clock and an alarm. Most titles had a "GAME A" (easy mode) and a "GAME B" (hard mode) button. Game B is usually a faster, more difficult version of Game A. Different models were manufactured, with some consoles having two screens (the Multiscreen Series) and a clam-shell design. The Nintendo DS later reused this design. The Game & Watch made handhelds vastly popular. Many toy companies followed in the footsteps of Game & Watch, such as Tiger Electronics and their Star Wars themed games. Nintendo's Game & Watch units were eventually superseded by the original Game Boy. Each Game & Watch was only able to play one game, due to the use of a segmented LCD display pre-printed with an overlay. The speed and responsiveness of the games was also limited by the time it took the LCD to change state.

The Game & Watch series sold 43.4 million units worldwide, including 12.87 million units in Japan and 30.53 million overseas.

=== Game Boy (1989) ===
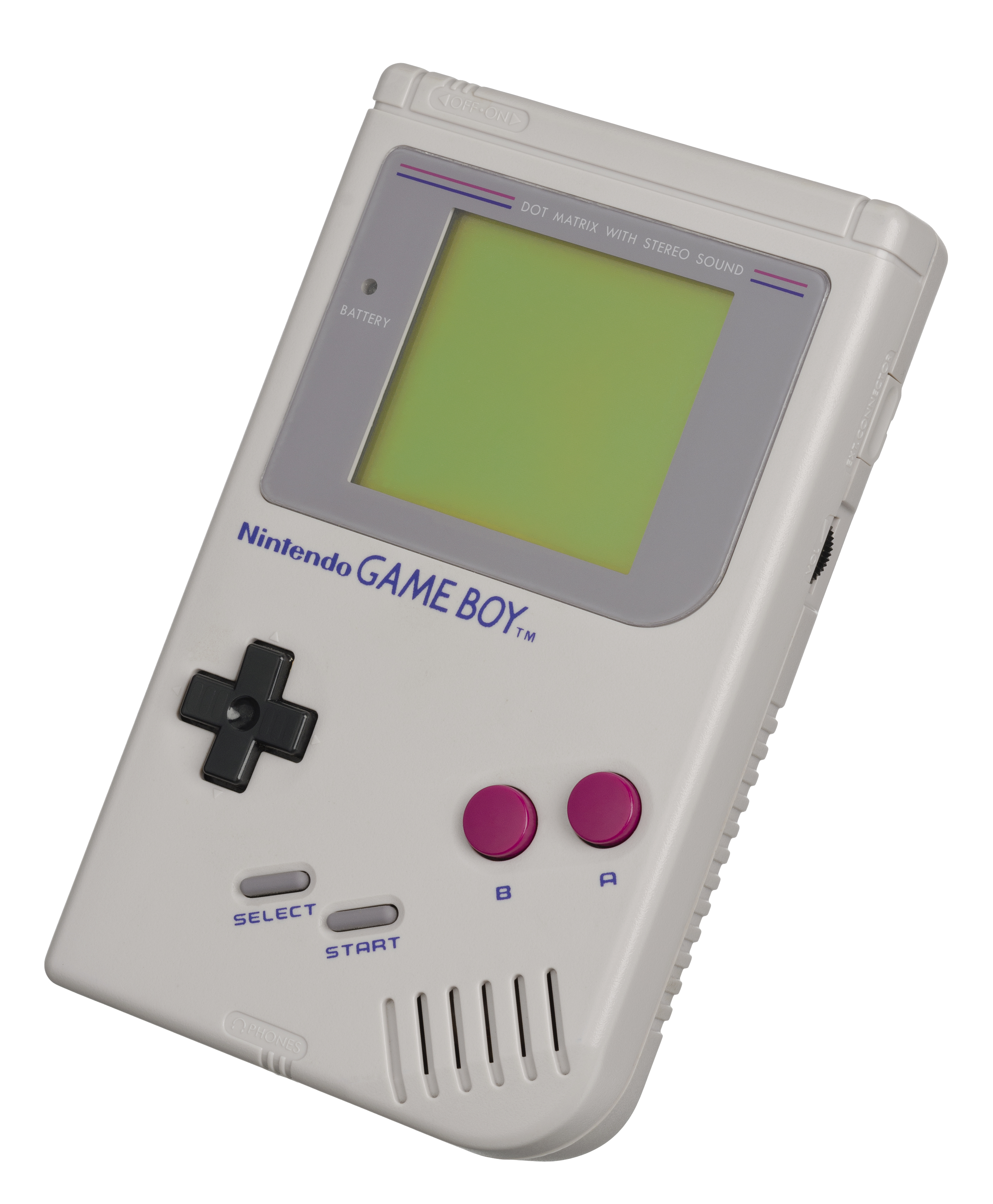
Original Game Boy

The Game Boy is an 8-bit handheld game console, the first such device developed by Nintendo, featuring interchangeable ROM cartridges, allowing it to act more like a portable version of a home console. It was released on April 21, 1989 in Japan, July 31, 1989 in North America, and September 28, 1990 in Europe. It features a dot-matrix display, a D-pad, four game buttons and a speaker, and uses Game Pak cartridges. Despite mixed reviews criticizing its monochrome graphics compared to competitors, the Game Boy's affordability, battery life, and extensive game library propelled it to market dominance. Nintendo released redesigned models including the smaller Game Boy Pocket (1996) and the Japan-only Game Boy Light (1998). By the time sales ended in March 2003, all variants of the monochrome Game Boy and the Game Boy Color combined had sold 118.69 million units worldwide, making them the fourth best-selling system of all time. Its best-selling games are Pokémon Red, Blue, and Yellow, which collectively shipped 46 million copies worldwide.

=== Game Boy Color (1998) ===
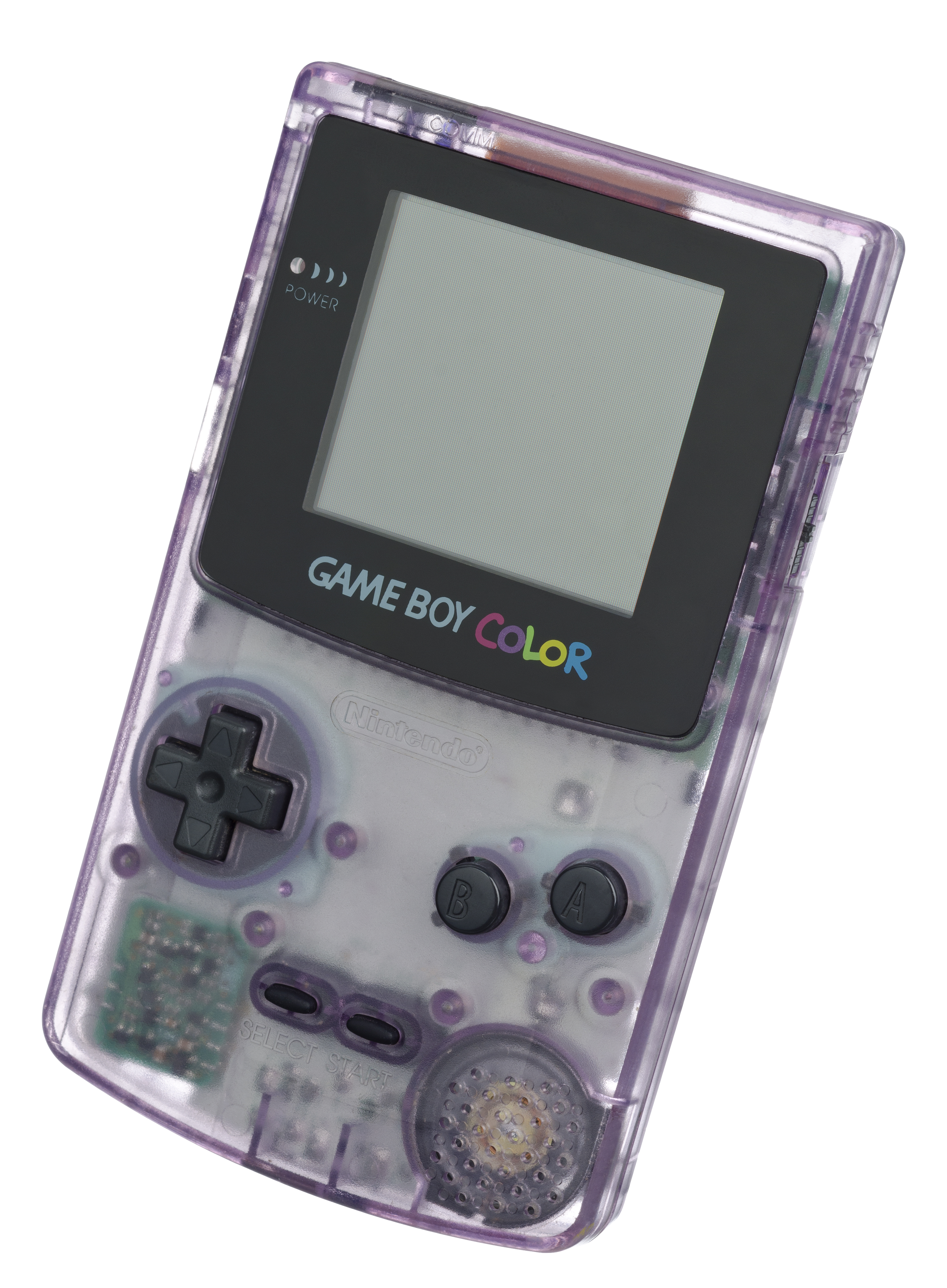
Game Boy Color

The Game Boy Color (GBC or CGB) was a transitional upgrade of the original Game Boy, part of the fifth generation of handheld consoles, made to better compete with the Neo Geo Pocket Color and the Japan-only WonderSwan Color. It was released on October 21, 1998 in Japan, November 18, 1998 in North America, November 23, 1998 in Europe, and November 27, 1998 in Australia. Compared to the original Game Boy, the Game Boy Color features a color TFT screen rather than monochrome, a processor that can operate twice as fast, and four times as much memory. It retains backward compatibility with games initially developed for its predecessor. While the handheld was slightly thicker, taller and had a smaller screen than its immediate predecessor, the Game Boy Pocket, the Color was significantly smaller than the original Game Boy. By the time sales ended in March 2003, all variants of the monochrome Game Boy and the Game Boy Color combined had sold 118.69 million units worldwide, making them the fourth best-selling system of all time. Its best-selling games are Pokémon Gold and Silver, which collectively shipped 23 million units worldwide.

=== Game Boy Advance (2001) ===
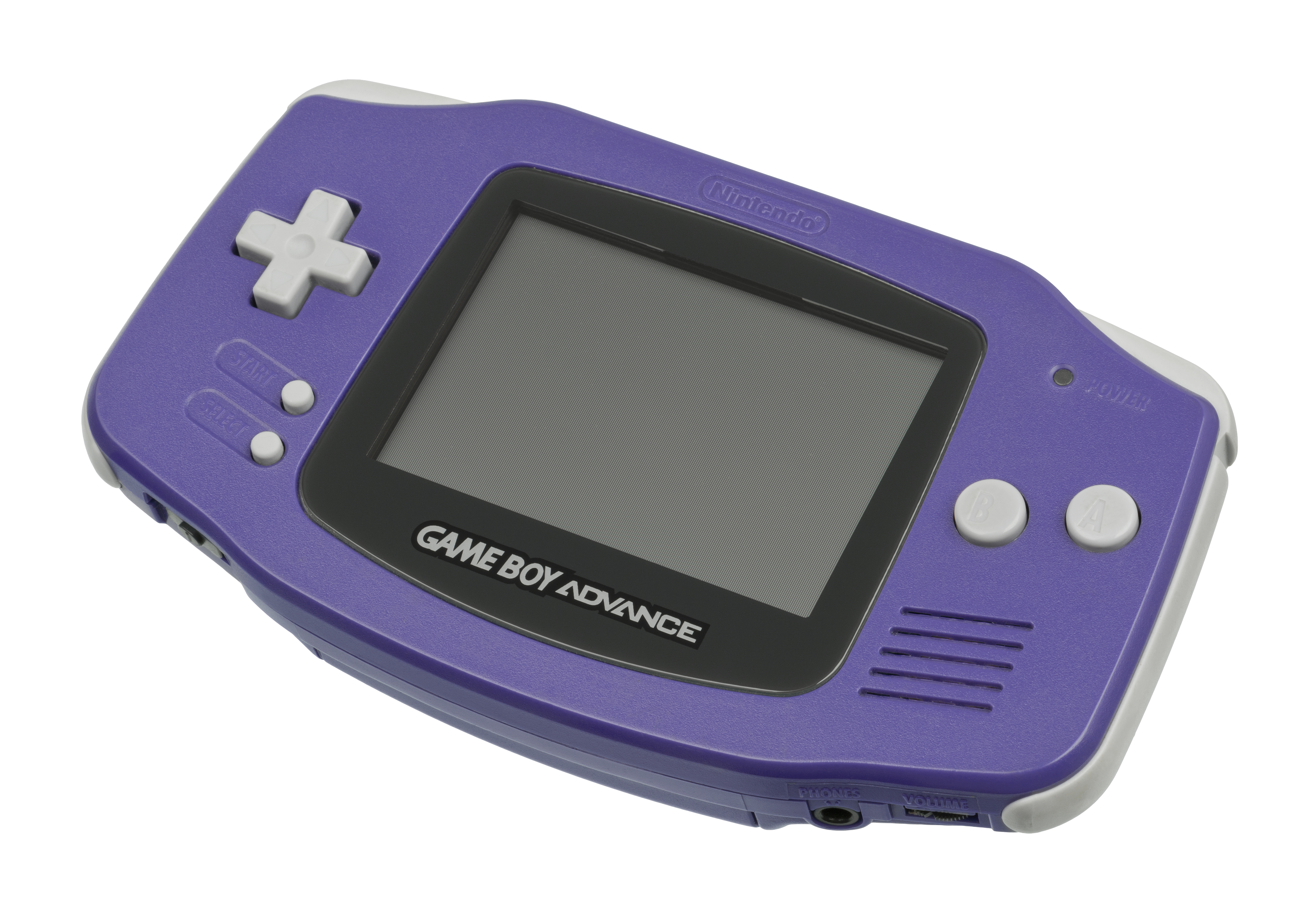
Original Game Boy Advance

The Game Boy Advance (GBA) is a 32-bit handheld game console which was released on March 21, 2001 in Japan, June 11, 2001 in North America, and June 22, 2001 in Europe and Australia. It was later released in mainland China in 2004, under the name iQue Game Boy Advance. Compared to the Game Boy Color it succeeded, the console offered a significantly more powerful ARM7 processor and improved graphics, while retaining backward compatibility with games initially developed for its predecessor. The original model was followed in 2003 by the Game Boy Advance SP, a redesigned model with a frontlit screen and clamshell form factor. A newer revision of the SP with a backlit screen was released in 2005. A miniaturized redesign, the Game Boy Micro, was released in September 2005. Across all models in the Game Boy Advance series, 81.51 million units were sold worldwide. Its best-selling games are Pokémon Ruby and Sapphire, which collectively shipped 16 million units worldwide. The GBA was officially discontinued by the end of 2010.

=== Pokémon Mini (2001) ===
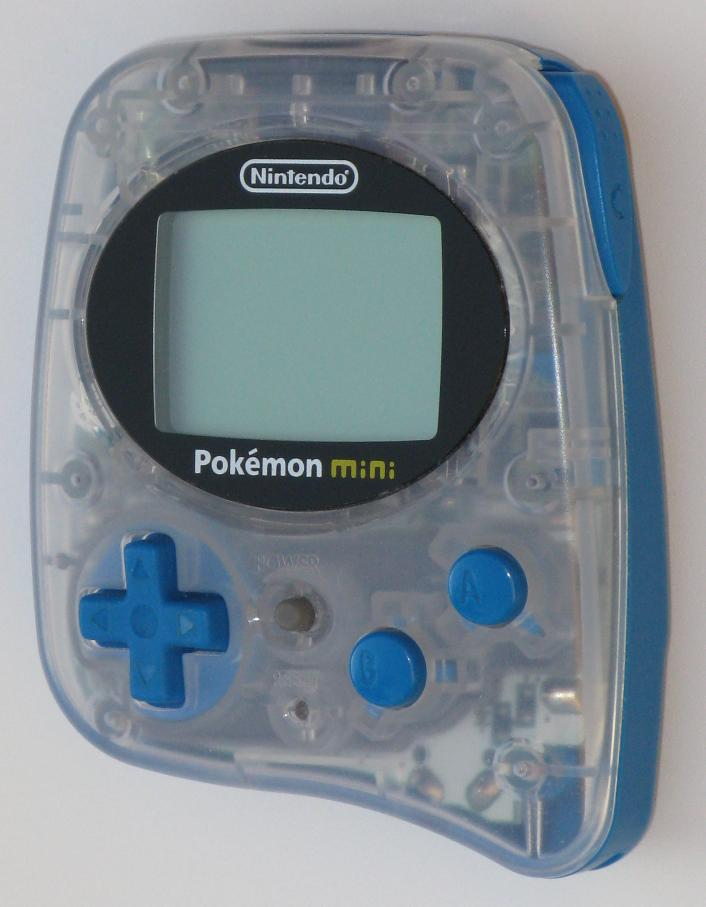
Pokémon Mini

The Pokémon Mini (stylized as Pokémon mini) is an 8-bit handheld game console designed and manufactured by Nintendo in conjunction with The Pokémon Company and themed around the Pokémon media franchise. It is the smallest game system with interchangeable cartridges ever produced by Nintendo, weighing just under two and a half ounces (71 grams). It was also Nintendo's cheapest console ever produced at US$45 (equivalent to $82 in 2025) and came bundled with the game Pokémon Party mini. It was first released in North America on November 16, 2001, and was only available for purchase at the Pokémon Center and via its website. This was followed by releases in Japan on December 14, 2001, and in Europe on March 15, 2002. Features of the Pokémon mini include an internal real-time clock, an infrared port used to facilitate multiplayer gaming, a reed switch for detecting when shaken, and a motor used to implement force feedback. Sales of the Pokémon Mini were poor and only ten games were released, five of which were exclusive to Japan.

=== Nintendo DS (2004) ===
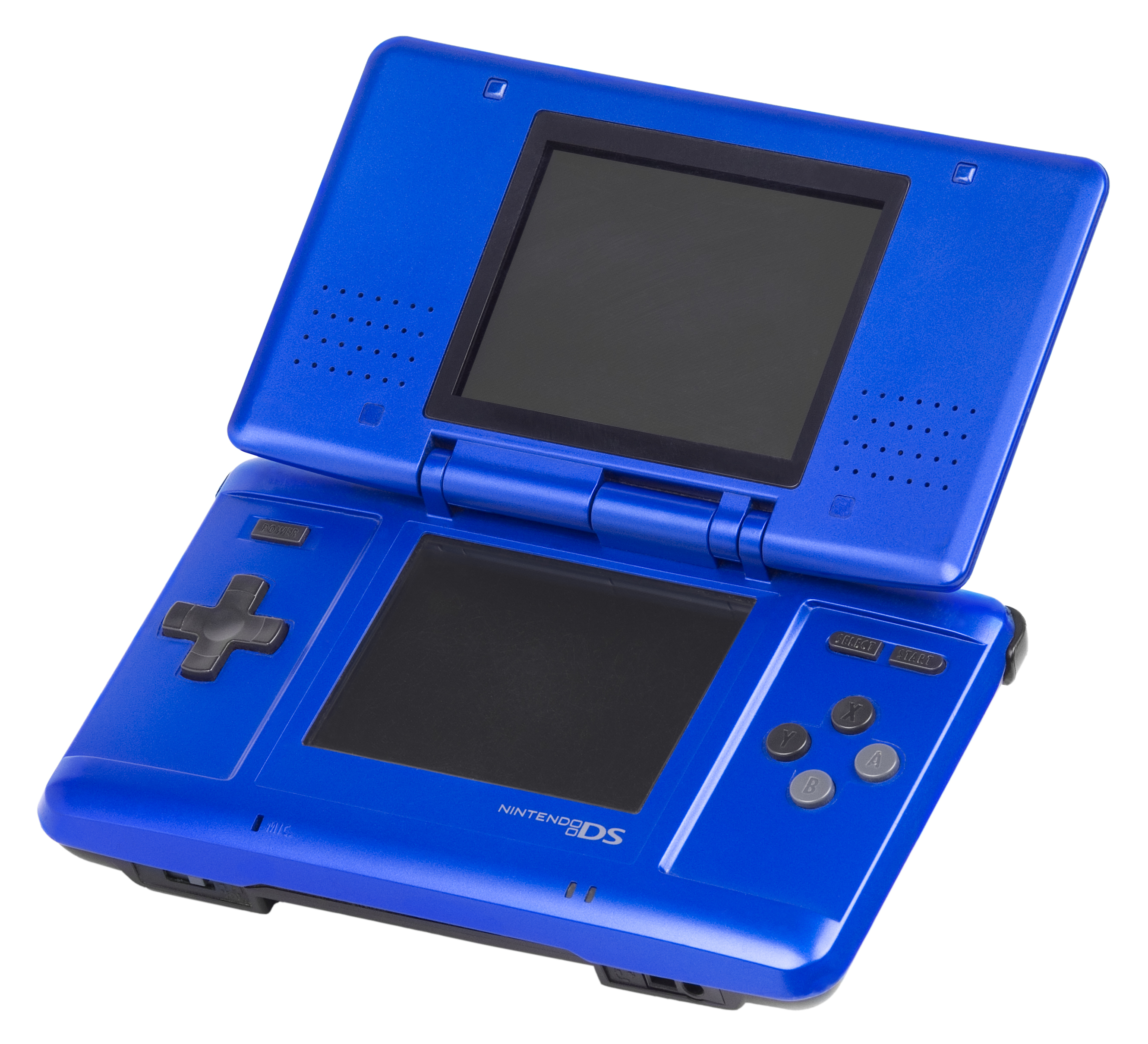
Original Nintendo DS

The Nintendo DS (iQue DS in China) is a handheld game console developed and manufactured by Nintendo, released on November 21, 2004 in North America, December 2, 2004 in Japan, February 24, 2005 in Australia, and March 11, 2005 in Europe, as the first system in the Nintendo DS family. It is visibly distinguishable by its horizontal clamshell design, and the presence of two displays, the lower of which acts as a resistive touchscreen. The system also has a built-in microphone and supports wireless IEEE 802.11 (Wi-Fi) standards, allowing players to interact with each other within short range (10–30 meters, depending on conditions) or over the Nintendo Wi-Fi Connection service via a standard Wi-Fi access point. According to Nintendo, the letters "DS" in the name stand for "Developers' System" and "Double Screen", the former of which refers to the features of the handheld designed to encourage innovative gameplay ideas among developers. The system was known as "Project Nitro" during development.

Nintendo released the Nintendo DS Lite, a redesigned model of the Nintendo DS, on March 2, 2006 in Japan, June 1, 2006 in Australia, June 11, 2006 in North America, and June 23, 2006 in Europe. A second redesign of the Nintendo DS, the Nintendo DSi, was released on November 1, 2008, in Japan, on April 2, 2009, in Australia, April 3, 2009, in Europe, and April 5, 2009, in North America. It contains two cameras and downloadable software capabilities, plus a built-in flash memory and web browser. An SD card slot replaces the Game Boy Advance cartridge slot. A similar model, known as the Nintendo DSi XL, was released on November 21, 2009 in Japan, March 5, 2010 in Europe, March 28, 2010 in North America, and April 15, 2010 in Australia. It features the same configurations as its predecessor, but is slightly larger and features a large stylus designed for home use.

As of December 31, 2013, Nintendo DS consoles have sold 154.98 million units, including 93.86 million Nintendo DS Lites, and the Nintendo DSi consoles have sold 41.33 million units. It was Nintendo's best-selling video game console until it was surpassed by the Nintendo Switch in 2025.

=== Nintendo 3DS (2011) ===
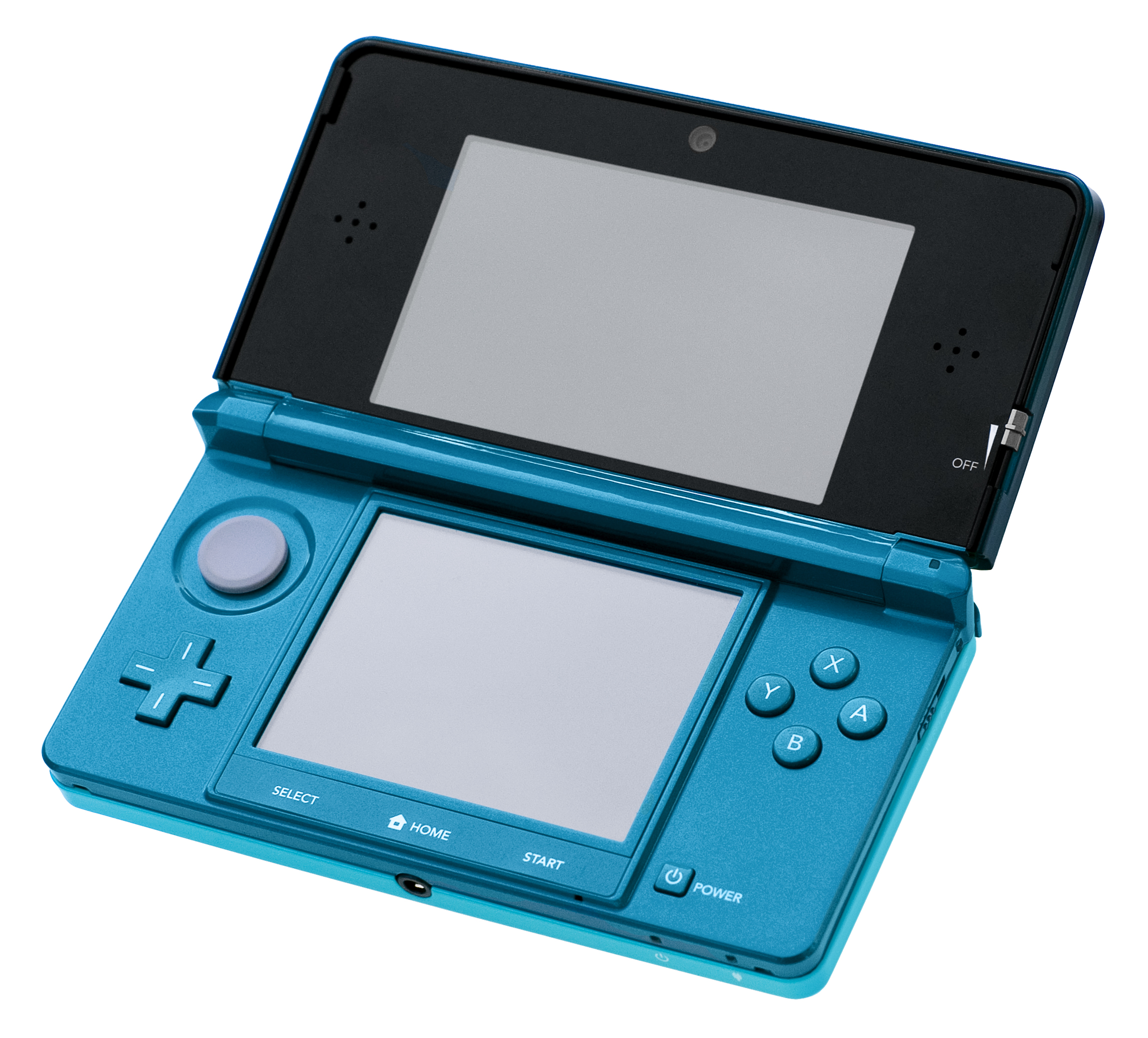
Original Nintendo 3DS

Although the name and look of the device are similar to that of the DS series, the Nintendo 3DS is the successor to the DS and is a brand new console. The Nintendo 3DS was released on February 26, 2011 in Japan, March 25, 2011 in Europe, March 27, 2011 in North America, and March 31, 2011 in Australia. It contains three cameras, two on the outside (for 3D photographs) and one internal one above the top screen. The bottom screen is a resistive touch screen comparable to the DS bottom screens, and the top screen is Wide Screen and an autostereoscopic 3D LCD. Autostereoscopy is a process that sent different images to the left and right eyes to enable the viewer to view the screen in 3D "without the need for special glasses". The 3DS is said to have enhanced Nintendo's online experience. The 3DS XL was released on July 28, 2012 in Japan and Europe, August 19, 2012 in North America, and August 23, 2012 in Australia, similar to the change between the DSi and DSi XL. It has 90% larger screens and design changes such as a matte finish and the stylus in a more accessible area. The Nintendo 2DS was released on October 12, 2013. It is a variant designed to be affordable without the clamshell design or 3D capabilities of the 3DS. Another redesign, the New Nintendo 3DS and New 3DS XL, was released on October 11, 2014 in Japan, November 21, 2014 in Australia, and February 13, 2015 in North America and Europe. It includes a C-Stick, ZR and ZL shoulder buttons, and a much faster CPU, allowing for more software specifically for the New Nintendo 3DS (such as Xenoblade Chronicles 3D). Like the original 3DS, the New Nintendo 3DS also has an XL form. As of December 31, 2013, Nintendo has sold 42.74 million units, including 15.21 million Nintendo 3DS XLs and 2.11 million Nintendo 2DS units.

The last handheld console in the 3DS family was the New Nintendo 2DS XL, which was released on June 15, 2017 in Australia, July 13, 2017 in Japan, and July 28, 2017 in North America and Europe. Production ceased on all Nintendo 3DS family systems on September 16, 2020.

== Hybrid and tabletop consoles ==
=== Virtual Boy (1995) ===
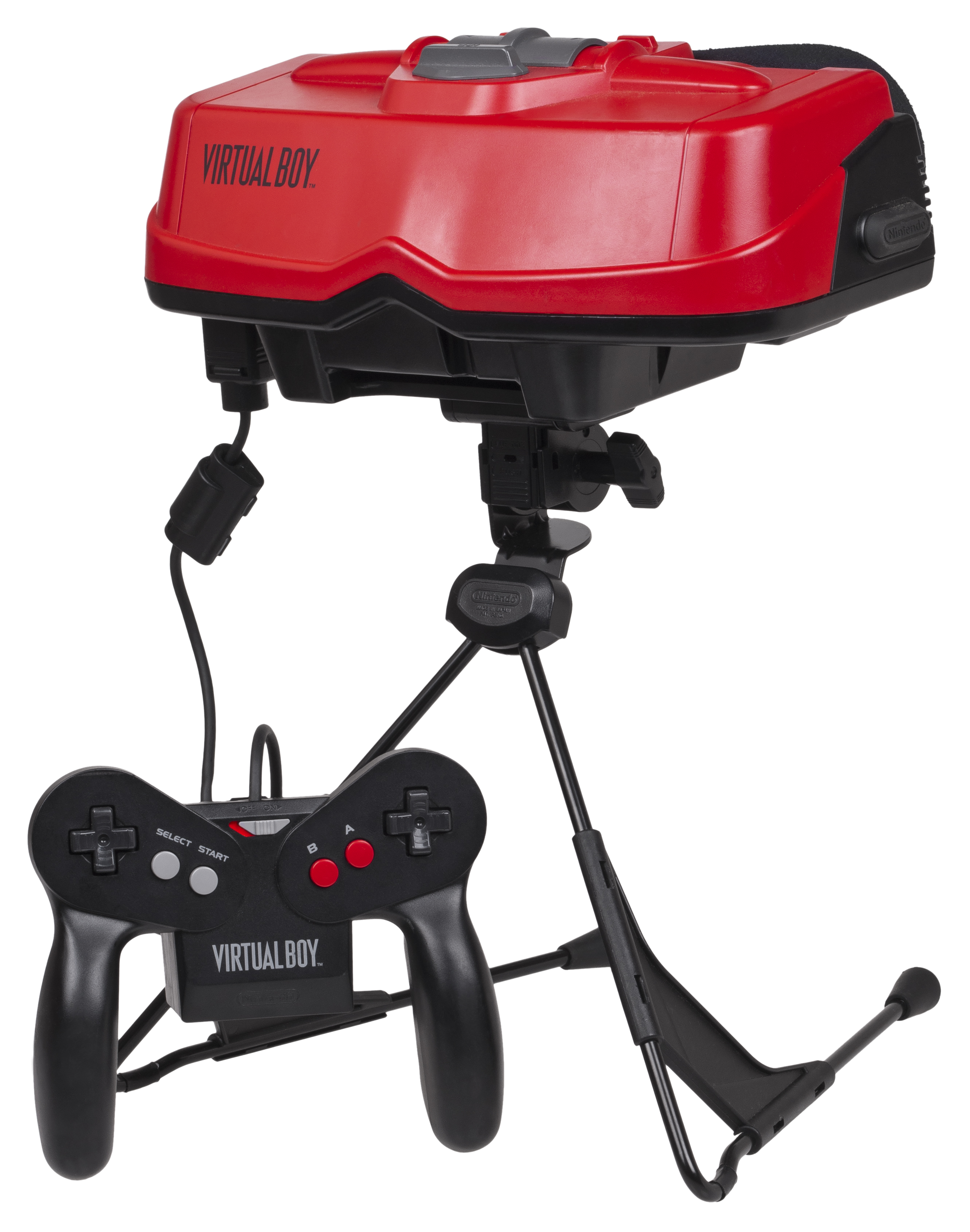
Virtual Boy

The Virtual Boy was the first portable game console capable of displaying true 3D graphics. Most video games are forced to use monocular cues to achieve the illusion of three dimensions on a two-dimensional screen, but the Virtual Boy was able to create a more accurate illusion of depth through an effect known as parallax. The Nintendo 3DS also uses this technology. In a manner similar to using a head-mounted display, the user looks into an eyepiece made of neoprene on the front of the machine, and then an eyeglass-style projector allows viewing of the monochromatic (in this case, red) image. It was released on July 21, 1995, in Japan and August 14, 1995, in North America and at a price of around US$180. It was never released in Europe, although a release schedule was initially planned. The system met with a lukewarm reception that was unaffected by continued price drops. Exactly 14 titles were released for Virtual Boy in North America, but only a few were met with positive reception. Nintendo discontinued the Virtual Boy within a few months of release.

=== Nintendo Switch (2017) ===
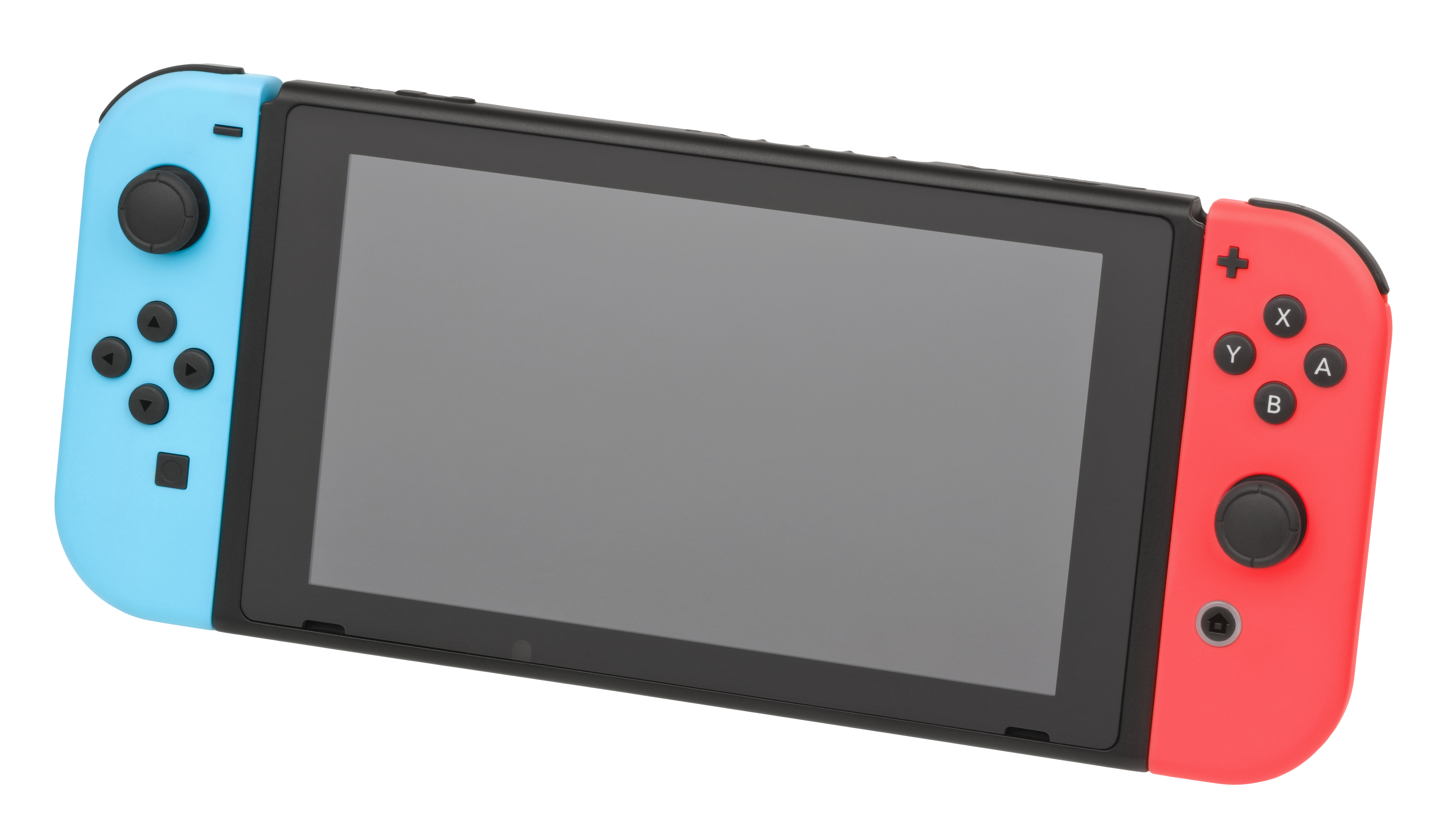
Nintendo Switch with Joy-Con controllers attached

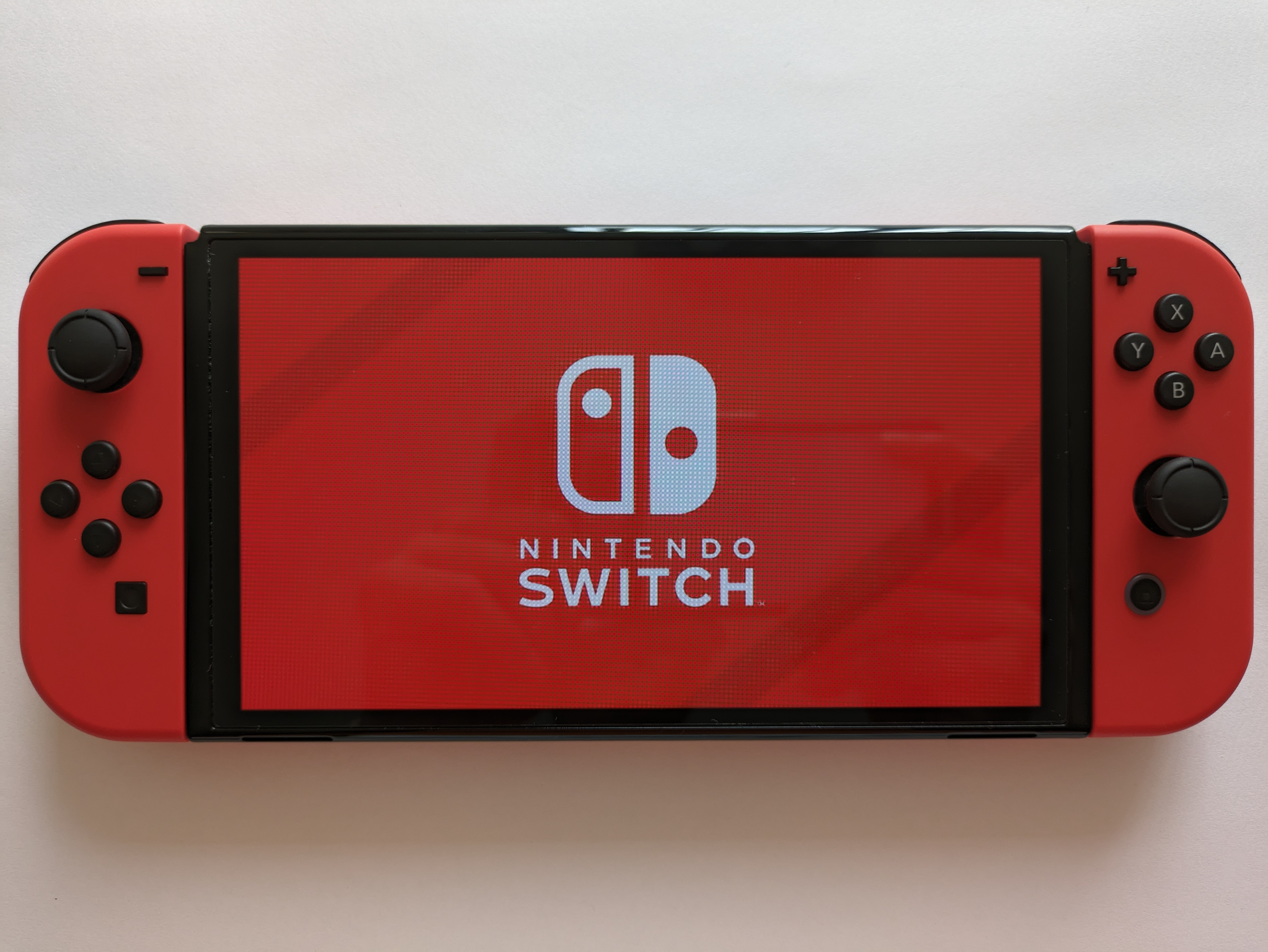
Nintendo Switch OLED with Joy-Con controllers attached

The Nintendo Switch was released on March 3, 2017, and is Nintendo's second entry in the eighth generation of video game consoles. The system was code-named "NX" prior to its official announcement. It is a hybrid device that can be used as a home console inserted to the Nintendo Switch Dock attached to a television, stood up on a table with the kickstand, or as a tablet-like handheld console, the handheld mode uses a capacitive touch screen like the smartphone. It features two detachable wireless controllers called Joy-Con, that can be used individually or attached to a grip to provide a more traditional gamepad form. Both Joy-Con are built with motion sensors and HD Rumble, Nintendo's haptic vibration feedback system for improved gameplay experiences. However, only the right Joy-Con has an NFC reader on its analog joystick for Amiibo and an IR sensor on the back. The Nintendo Switch Pro Controller is a traditional style controller much like that of the GameCube.

The Nintendo Switch has currently sold 155.37 million units as of December 31, 2025, outselling all of Nintendo's previous video game consoles, making it the second best-selling video game console of all time, behind Sony's PlayStation 2.

The Nintendo Switch Lite is a more affordable version of the Nintendo Switch released by Nintendo on September 20, 2019. The Switch Lite console is similar to a regular Nintendo Switch and can play almost all standard Switch games, but is a handheld portable-only version and is also slightly smaller. It comes in five color variations: grey, turquoise, coral, yellow, and blue, as well as some special editions. Its Joy-Con controllers cannot be detached like in the original Nintendo Switch model.

A second variation, the Nintendo Switch – OLED Model, was released on October 8, 2021, which makes several adjustments and improvements over the original, including an improved kickstand, a larger OLED screen, and more storage (64 GB instead of the regular 32 GB present in the original Nintendo Switch and Switch Lite).

=== Nintendo Switch 2 (2025) ===
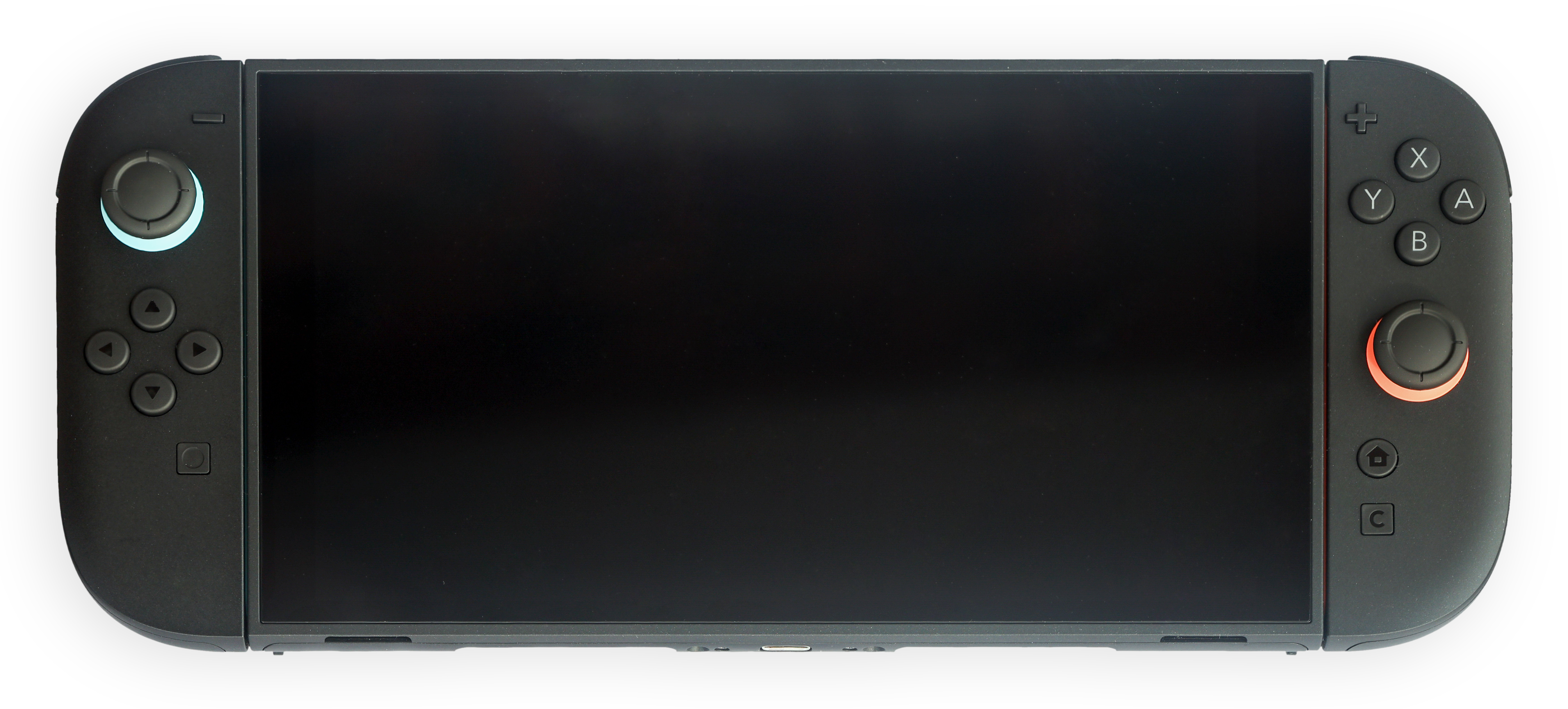
Nintendo Switch 2 with Joy-Con 2 controllers attached

On January 16, 2025, Nintendo announced the successor to the Nintendo Switch after almost 8 years, the Nintendo Switch 2 was revealed. The Switch 2 is backwards compatible with most physical and digital Switch games. The console was released on June 5, 2025. Like the original Switch, it can be used as a portable handheld, as a tablet, or connected via the dock to an external display. The Joy-Con 2 controllers can be used while attached to or detached from the device. It has a larger liquid-crystal display and more internal storage than the original Switch. It has updated graphics, controllers, and social features. It supports 1080p resolution and a 120Hz refresh rate in handheld or tabletop mode, and 4K resolution with a 60Hz refresh rate when docked.

Nintendo reported on June 10, 2025, four days from release, that the Switch 2 had sold more than 3.5 million units worldwide, which made it the company's fastest selling console to date. Famitsu reported that the console had sold 947,931 units in Japan within the first four days of its release, surpassing the Switch's launch of 329,152 units sold in the region. IGN said that launch sales of the Switch 2 in these first four days were twice as much as the launch sales of the Switch in all regions.

== Other hardware ==
- Game Boy Camera – a monochrome camera cartridge for the original version of the Game Boy which includes a picture editor and the ability to print pictures via Game Boy Printer.
- Satellaview – only released in Japan, an add-on for the Super Famicom (Japanese SNES) which allowed anyone to download games by a satellite.
- Game Boy Player – an adapter for playing Game Boy games on the GameCube.
- Game Boy Printer – an adapter designed for printing things from the Game Boy onto adhesive stickers. For example, it was used for printing out Game Boy Camera pictures and Pokémon information from the Pokédex in the Game Boy Pokémon games.
- e-Reader – an add-on for the Game Boy Advance for scanning special "e-Reader cards", paper cards with specially encoded data printed on them.
- iQue Player – a version of the Nintendo 64, with double the clock speed and downloadable games, released only in China.
- Nintendo 64DD – only released in Japan, this add-on system's games are on rewritable magnetic disks. Games released include a paint and 3D construction package, F-Zero X Expansion Kit, for creating new F-Zero X tracks, a sequel to the SNES version of SimCity, SimCity 64 and others.
- Mobile Adapter GB – only released in Japan, this peripheral allowed a Game Boy Color or Game Boy Advance to connect to a mobile phone and utilize its cellular network to connect to the Mobile System GB service. Together, they enabled online functionality for roughly 20 games, most notably Pokémon Crystal.
- Pokémon Pikachu – a handheld device similar to the popular Tamagotchi toy which allows the user to take care of Pikachu in the manner of a pet.
- Super Game Boy – adapter for playing Game Boy games on the Super NES, displayed in color.
- Triforce – an arcade system based on GameCube hardware, developed in partnership with Sega and Namco.
- Computer Mah-jong Yakuman – a handheld Japanese mahjong game released in 1983 that featured the ability to connect two devices together with a cable, which inspired the Game Boy's Game Link Cable.
- GameCube Microphone – used in Karaoke Revolution Party, Mario Party 6, Mario Party 7 and Odama for the GameCube. It recognizes basic sounds and incorporates them into gameplay.
- Nintendo Gateway System – a proprietary hardware/software console available on commercial aircraft and hotel properties, providing shopping, information, and interactive entertainment.
- Panasonic Q – a version of the GameCube which could play DVDs developed by Panasonic released only in Japan.
- Visteon Dockable Entertainment System – a portable DVD player containing officially licensed Game Boy Advance hardware.
- Pokéwalker – a Pedometer used in Pokémon HeartGold and SoulSilver that can be used to enhance a Pokémon HeartGold and SoulSilver game by giving some special Pokémon and items as well as other added benefits that reward depending on how many steps one can take.
- Activity Meter – an infrared (IR) pedometer for use the Nintendo DS game, Personal Trainer: Walking.
- Fit Meter – a portable accessory for use with the Wii U game, Wii Fit U, that tracks the number of steps taken and the elevation climbed. It can also be synced with the game using the Wii U GamePad.
- Poké Ball Plus – a Joy-Con replacement used with Pokémon: Let's Go, Pikachu! and Let's Go, Eevee! that can be used similarly to it, and can also be used to bring the player's Pokémon character with them for in-game rewards.
- Game Boy Pocket Sonar – only released in Japan, a fishing sonar peripheral for the Game Boy developed by Bandai.
- Barcode Boy – only released in Japan, a barcode scanner peripheral for the Game Boy developed by Namco.
