= Game Boy Advance SP =

Handheld game console by Nintendo

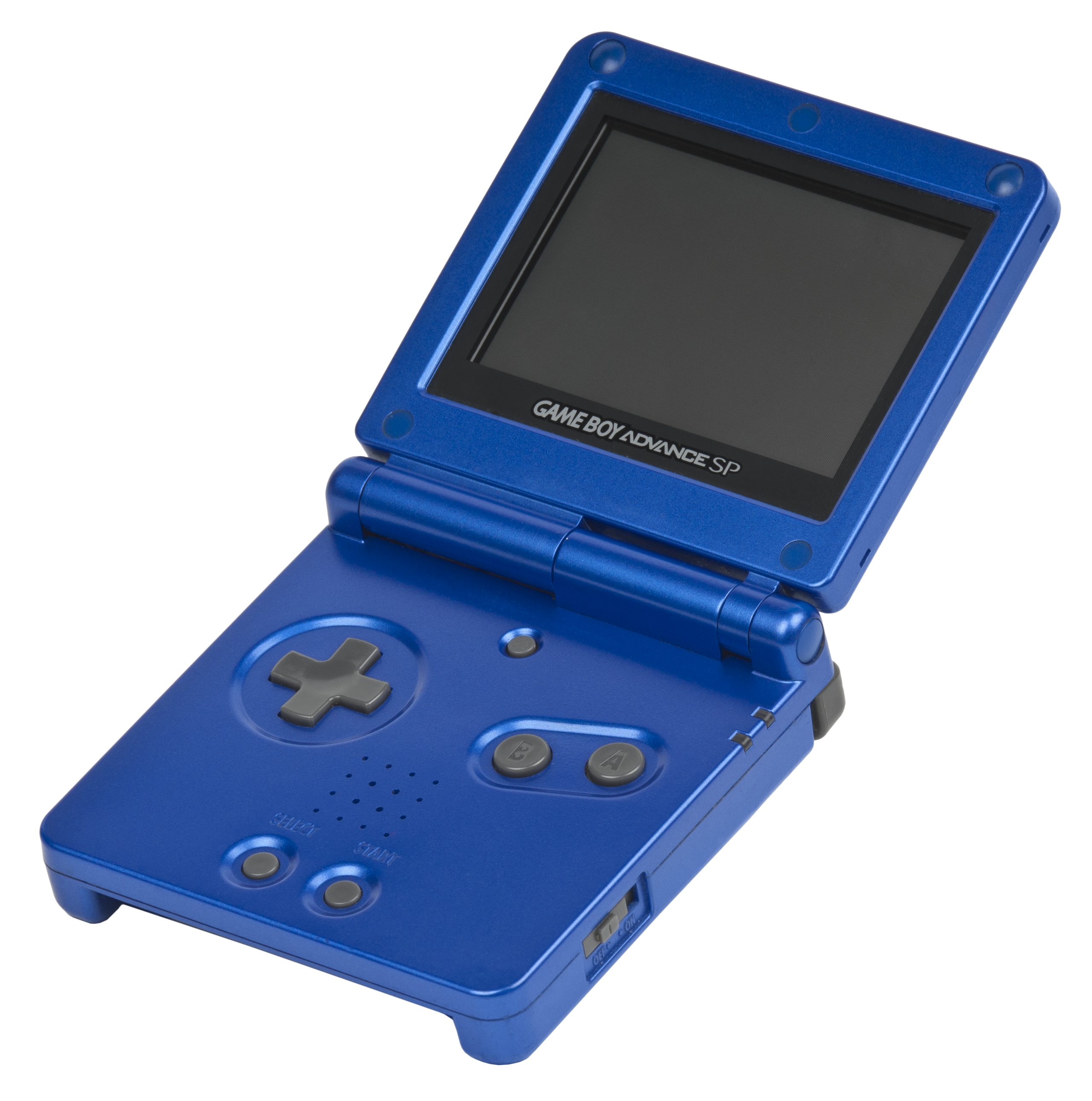
- An early front-lit version of the Game Boy Advance SP in Cobalt Blue
- Also known as: Frontlit: AGS-001; Backlit: AGS-101
- Developer: Nintendo Research & Engineering
- Manufacturer: Nintendo
- Product family: Game Boy
- Type: Handheld game console
- Generation: Sixth
- Released: February 14, 2003: JP: February 14, 2003; NA: March 23, 2003; PAL: March 28, 2003
- Introductory price: US$99.99 (equivalent to $180 in 2025); ¥12,500 (equivalent to ¥14,200 in 2024); €129.99 (equivalent to €200 in 2023); CA$149.95 (equivalent to $240 in 2025); A$199.99 (equivalent to $320 in 2022); £89 (equivalent to £160 in 2025)
- Discontinued: 2010
- Units shipped: 43.57 million
- Media: Game Boy Game Pak; Game Boy Color Game Pak; Game Boy Advance Game Pak
- System on a chip: Nintendo CPU AGB
- CPU: ARM7TDMI @ 16.78 MHz; Sharp SM83 @ 4 / 8 MHz
- Memory: 288 KB RAM, 98 KB Video RAM
- Display: Frontlit or backlit TFT LCD, 240 × 160 px, 40.8 × 61.2 mm (1.61 × 2.41 in)
- Backward compatibility: Game Boy; Game Boy Color
- Predecessor: Game Boy Color
- Successor: Nintendo DS
- Related: Game Boy Advance; Game Boy Micro

The Game Boy Advance SP (Note: ゲームボーイアドバンスSP (Japanese: Gēmu Bōi Adobansu SP)) (SP stands for "Special") is a handheld game console developed and marketed by Nintendo. It was released in Japan on February 14, 2003, and in other regions in March. The SP is an upgraded version of the Game Boy Advance with a more compact clamshell design.

The SP was the first Game Boy device with a rechargeable battery, and the first widely released (Note: The Game Boy Light, released in 1998 had an electroluminescent screen, but was only sold in Japan.) model with an integrated screen light, starting with front lighting and later transitioning to backlighting. The light made it easier to play in low-light conditions than its predecessors, which relied on reflective screens. It was followed by the Game Boy Micro in 2005.

== History ==
The Game Boy Advance SP was championed by Satoru Okada, who led the development of the original Game Boy Advance. When Okada first pitched to Nintendo leadership the idea of a small and thin Game Boy Advance that used a rechargeable battery, the feedback was almost entirely negative. Not deterred, Okada told one of his hardware engineers to build a conceptual model as small and thin as possible without regard to the feasibility of manufacturing the device. What resulted was the clamshell design of the Game Boy Advance SP. When Okada took this conceptual model to the same leadership group that rejected his initial pitch, they were quickly won over.

In addition to being smaller and using a rechargeable battery, the Game Boy Advance SP also addressed a key shortcoming of the original Game Boy Advance: the reflective color display that was hard to see in dark conditions.

The first Game Boy Advance SP had a frontlight that illuminated the front of the display and a reflective surface behind the screen that sent light back through the liquid crystal pixel elements to the viewer. A later revision replaced the frontlight and reflective surface with a backlight that also illuminated the liquid crystal pixel elements.

All Game Boy Advance SP models were discontinued globally by the end of 2010, outlasting the Game Boy Micro by two years and marking the end of the Game Boy hardware series.

== Hardware ==
=== Technical specifications ===
	Game Boy Advance SP (AGS-001)	Game Boy Advance SP (AGS-101)
Height	84 mm (3.3 in) (closed), 155 mm (6.1 in) (open)	
Width	82 mm (3.2 in)	
Depth	24.4 mm (0.96 in)	
Weight	142 g (5.0 oz)	
Display	2.9-inch (diagonal) reflective thin-film transistor (TFT) color liquid-crystal display (LCD), 40.8 mm × 61.2 mm (1.61 in × 2.41 in) with frontlight	2.9-inch (diagonal) backlit TFT color LCD, 40.8 mm × 61.2 mm (1.61 in × 2.41 in)
Resolution	240 (w) × 160 (h) pixels (3:2 aspect ratio)	
Frame rate	59.737 Hz	
Color support	32,768 colors, up to 511 simultaneously in character mode, all may displayed simultaneously in Bitmap mode	
System on a chip (SoC)	Nintendo CPU AGB	
Processors	16.78 MHz ARM7TDMI (32-bit); 4.194304 MHz / 8.388608 MHz Sharp SM83 (custom Intel 8080/Zilog Z80 hybrid, 8-bit) (Note: 4.194304 MHz for Game Boy backward compatibility, 8.388608 MHz for Game Boy Color backward compatibility.)	
Memory	On SoC: 32 KB RAM, 98 KB Video RAM (includes 1 KB of object attribute memory and 1 KB of palette RAM); Internal: 256 KB RAM	
Battery	Rechargeable lithium-ion pack provides 10 hours of use with light on and 18 hours with light off, 3-hour recharge time	
Sound	Channels: Dual 8-bit DAC for stereo sound (called Direct Sound), plus all legacy channels from Game Boy. The DACs can be used to play back streams of wave data, or used to output multiple wave samples processed or mixed in software by the CPU.; Outputs: Built-in mono speaker	
I/O	Game Link Cable (512 kbit/s between up to 4 devices); Game Pak slot	
Controls	Eight-way control pad; Six action buttons (A, B, L, R, Start, Select); Volume slider; Frontlight power button; Power switch	Eight-way control pad; Six action buttons (A, B, L, R, Start, Select); Volume slider; Backlight brightness button; Power switch

=== Headphone jack ===
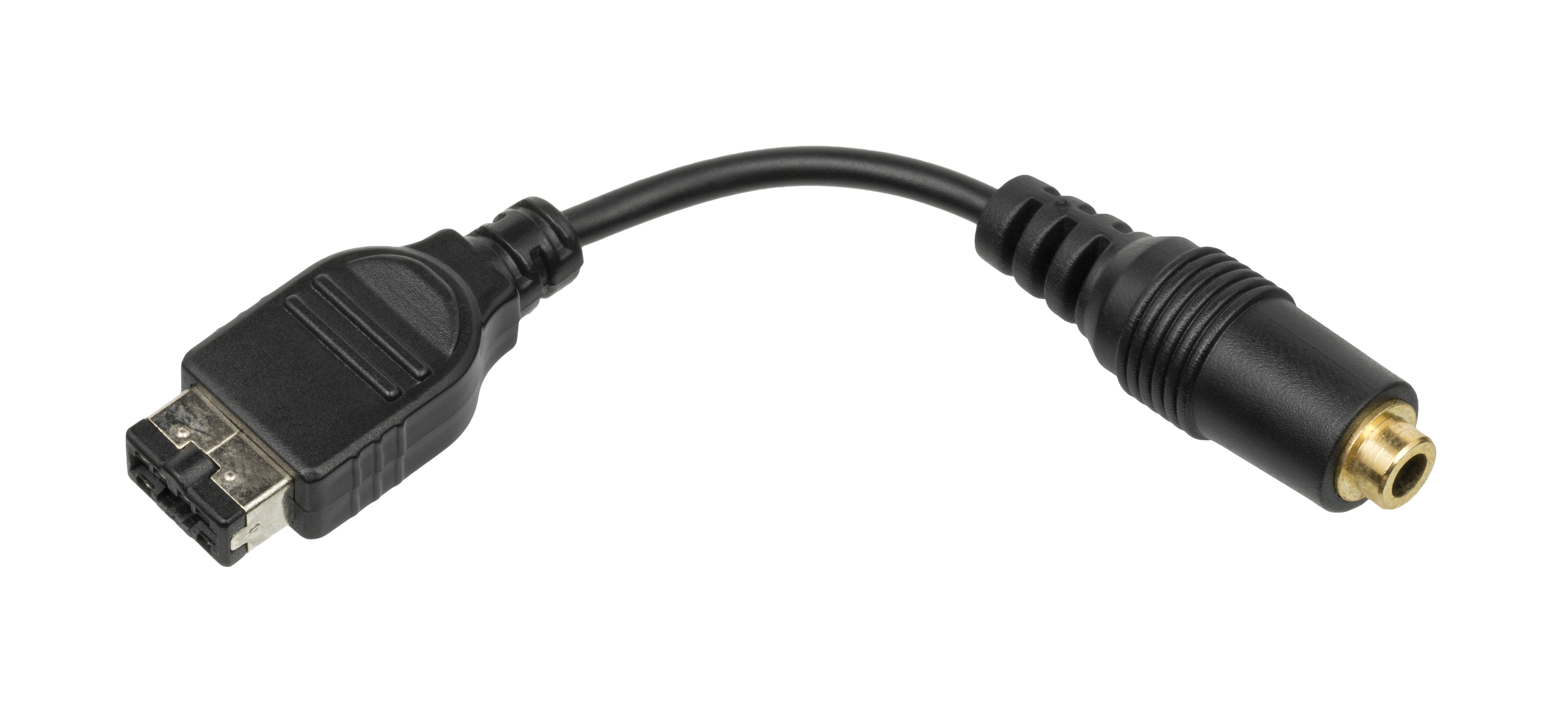
Nintendo-official headphone adapter for Game Boy Advance SP

Nintendo removed the 3.5 mm headphone jack from the SP, which had been included on all previous Game Boy models. Headphones designed specifically for the GBA SP can be purchased, or standard headphones can be attached with an optional adapter that plugs into the same port as the AC adapter. As both the AC adapter and headphones use the same port, it is not possible to charge the SP and listen to headphones at the same time with the Nintendo-brand adapter. There are, however, third-party adapters that "split" into two different cords: the power jack on one side and a headphone jack on the other.

== Backlit model (AGS-101) ==
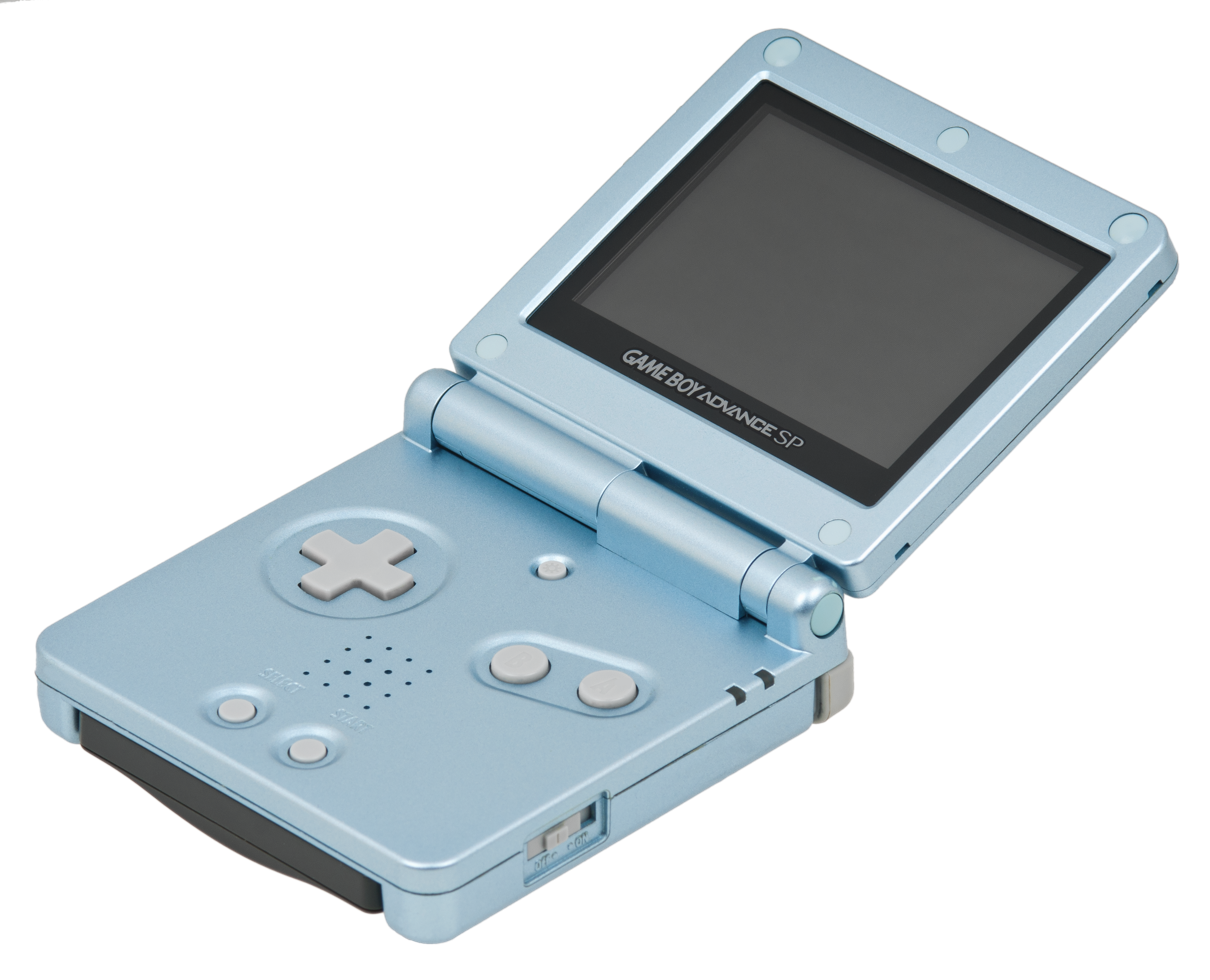
The pearl blue AGS-101 GBA SP model that featured an improved backlit screen

On September 19, 2005 — shortly after the release of the Game Boy Micro and about a year after the launch of the Nintendo DS — Nintendo released an updated Game Boy Advance SP in North America, featuring a brighter backlit screen in place of the earlier model's frontlit display. While this model was well regarded for its improved screen, some took issue at to its inferior pixel response and how its expanded color space potentially disregards the artistic intent of earlier released games.

It was Nintendo's first handheld system released worldwide with an integrated backlight, although the Japan-only Game Boy Light had used an electroluminescent backlit display several years earlier.

The AGS-101 revision was not officially released in Japan, and the frontlit AGS-001 model remained on sale until production ended.

The new model can be distinguished by the following features:

- The box states "Now with a BRIGHTER backlit screen!" to distinguish the new model from the older, frontlit models.
- The model number of the backlit SP is AGS-101, whereas the model number of the original frontlit SP is AGS-001. This can be found on the label at the bottom of the unit.
- The mini button at the top center of the console's lower face is now referred to in the manual as the "Brightness Switch" and selects between two levels of brightness, "Normal" (Low) and "Bright" (High) with no off setting. On the frontlit models, this button turned the frontlight on or off only. With the backlight set to "Normal" (Low) the brightness still surpasses the original AGS-001 with the frontlight on.
- When powered off, the backlit model's screen is completely black, but the frontlit model's screen is noticeably lighter.

The North American backlit version comes in three standard colors: "Pearl Blue", "Pearl Pink" and "Graphite" (a greyer version of Onyx Black). There were also two Toys "R" Us exclusive backlit models; a "SpongeBob SquarePants" model and a "Limited Edition Pikachu" model.

In 2006, the AGS-101 backlit model also saw a very limited release in Europe. The European version was released in "Surf Blue" as well as re-issued in "Pink" and "Tribal" editions.

Unlike the North American release, the European box does not feature any prominent text to distinguish the backlit models from the older frontlit models. In addition, only the "Surf Blue" color was unique to the AGS-101, the other two colors "Pink" and "Tribal" had already been released as frontlit models – for these reasons it can be very difficult to identify a European backlit SP. Apart from the AGS-101 model number on the base of the unit, the only other obvious distinguishing feature of the European backlit model is the large picture of the Game Boy Advance SP featured on the front of the box. (The European frontlit models of "Pink" and "Tribal" only feature small pictures of the Game Boy Advance SP on the sides of the box and Flower/Tattoo patterns on the front, respectively.)

The AGS-101 Game Boy Advance SP was the final Nintendo handheld to have backward compatibility with Game Boy and Game Boy Color games in North America and Europe.

== Unit colors ==
The GBA SP launched in Platinum Silver and Cobalt Blue, with the addition of Onyx in Europe and Japan. Later colors include: Flame Red, Pearl Pink, Pearl Blue, Graphite, Midnight Blue, Charizard Fire Red, Torchic Orange, Venusaur Leaf Green, Groudon Red, Kyogre Blue, Rayquaza Green, NES classic design, and Pikachu Yellow. A limited gold edition with a Triforce and the Hyrule Royal Family crest was available in Europe which included a copy of The Legend of Zelda: The Minish Cap. In 2003, Toys "R" Us sold an exclusive gold edition (without any Zelda symbols) in the US starting on Black Friday of that year, initially with a Super Mario Advance 4 game.

In Japan, it was released in a variety of standard colors and special packages. In most other regions it was released in Platinum Silver and Charcoal Black. Later, a Flame Red version was released. Six special editions have also been released: an NES Classics model with the same color scheme as a classic NES controller (and designed to resemble an NES deck when closed), a SpongeBob SquarePants model, a Pikachu model, and a silver model with a tattoo design printed on it, known as the 'Tribal Edition'. In other regions, such as Europe, Asia, and the Middle East, additional colors have been released, such as Pearl Green and Starlight Gold.

== Reception ==
M. Wiley of IGN called the Game Boy Advance SP "a step in the right direction for Nintendo", praising the system's new redesign over the original GBA and highlighting its inclusion of a backlit screen and rechargeable battery, although minor criticism went towards the system's omission of a headphone jack. Engadget gave it a global score of 84 out of 100, also praising the new features of the redesign while noting the system's lack of a headphone jack. Lawson Wong of Fresh Gear called it "darn close to perfection" aside from the missing headphone jack. Matthew D. Sarrel of PC Magazine suggested it to consumers as an improvement over the original model, praising the backlight and integration of a charger as well as improved visual quality, though he noted that players with larger hands may find difficulty with the system's design.

== Sales ==
As of June 30, 2009, the Game Boy Advance series has sold 81.48 million units worldwide, of which 43.52 million are Game Boy Advance SP units.

Life-to-date Number of units sold
Date	Japan	Americas	Other	Total
2003-03-31	0.82 million	0.83 million	0.46 million	2.10 million
2003-06-30	?	?	?	4.84 million
2003-09-30	2.33 million	4.32 million	2.38 million	9.04 million
2003-12-31	3.14 million	7.82 million	4.34 million	15.30 million
2004-03-31	3.68 million	8.78 million	4.70 million	17.16 million
2004-06-30	?	?	?	19.33 million
2004-09-30	5.02 million	12.46 million	6.21 million	23.68 million
2004-12-31	5.94 million	16.13 million	8.67 million	30.73 million
2005-03-31	6.00 million	16.69 million	9.10 million	31.79 million
2005-06-30	?	?	?	
2005-09-30	6.16 million	18.08 million	10.08 million	34.32 million
2005-12-31	6.35 million	20.40 million	10.64 million	37.40 million
2006-03-31	6.42 million	20.95 million	10.86 million	38.23 million
2006-06-30	6.46 million	21.30 million	11.08 million	38.84 million
2006-09-30	6.48 million	21.95 million	11.37 million	39.79 million
2006-12-31	6.50 million	23.06 million	11.78 million	41.33 million
2007-03-31	6.50 million	23.47 million	11.95 million	41.92 million
2007-06-30	6.50 million	23.78 million	12.14 million	42.43 million
2007-09-30	6.51 million	24.01 million	12.31 million	42.82 million
2007-12-31	6.51 million	24.01 million	12.51 million	43.02 million
2008-03-31	6.51 million	24.00 million	12.71 million	43.23 million
2008-06-30	6.51 million	24.00 million	12.89 million	43.41 million
2008-09-30	6.51 million	24.00 million	12.97 million	43.49 million
2008-12-31	6.51 million	24.00 million	13.00 million	43.52 million

== See also ==
- List of Game Boy Advance games
