= Frontlight =

Illumination of a screen from the front

A frontlight is a means of illuminating a display device, usually a liquid crystal display (LCD), which would otherwise be viewed in ambient light. This improves its performance in poor lighting conditions.

An LCD presents an image by absorbing some light passing through it. When an electric field is applied across the crystal, it changes the passing light so it will not pass through a polarization filter. This allows LCDs to operate at low power, as no energy needs to be spent generating light. Many battery-operated electronic devices, including most calculators and other devices use unilluminated LCDs.

An unilluminated LCD must be lit from the front. To use ambient light, the liquid crystal itself is sandwiched between a polarization filter and a reflective surface. The mirror makes the display opaque so it cannot be illuminated from the back. Most often a light source is placed around the perimeter of the LCD.

The frontlight has found a place among devices using E Ink displays such as E-readers. One drawback of E Ink displays is that often they do not produce light on their own, preventing users from reading in dark areas. The opaque displays of E Ink devices may prevent the use of backlighting, thus frontlights have often been used.

Frontlights are relatively uncommon overall. Electroluminescent lights present a reflective surface when turned off. This allows for a backlit display which can also be used with ambient light. Such backlights are popular in digital watches. The monochromatic light from an electroluminescent source does not work well with color displays, however. An incandescent frontlight was therefore a popular accessory for the Nintendo Game Boy lineup from the original release through the Game Boy Advance in 2001; the Game Boy Advance SP in 2003 introduced a frontlight, making external lights redundant.

== Devices using a frontlight ==
- GP32 FLU (2002)
- Game Boy Advance SP (Note: AGS-001 only; the later AGS-101 revision used a backlight) (2003)
- Kindle Paperwhite (2013)
- Amazon Kindle (Since 2019)

== See also ==
- LCD
- Backlight
