= Kuru Kuru Kururin =

2001 video game

- European box art
- Developer: Eighting
- Publisher: Nintendo
- Directors: Hiroshi Sato; Masato Toyoshima
- Producer: Shinji Hatano
- Programmer: Yasunari Watanabe
- Artists: Shinichi Ōnishi; Yōichi Kotabe
- Composer: Atsuhiro Motoyama
- Series: Kururin
- Platform: Game Boy Advance
- Release: JP: March 21, 2001; PAL: June 22, 2001
- Genre: Puzzle
- Modes: Single-player, multiplayer

Kuru Kuru Kururin (Note: Japanese: くるくるくるりん) is a puzzle video game developed by Eighting and published by Nintendo for the Game Boy Advance. It was released in Japan on March 21, 2001, and in Europe and Australia on June 22 as a launch title for the system. Kuru Kuru Kururin is the first title in the Kururin series and was followed by two Japan-only sequels, Kururin Paradise (2002) and Kururin Squash! (2004). The story follows Kururin, a bird who attempts to rescue his siblings after his mother lost them.

The gameplay revolves around a constantly spinning helicopter the player must navigate through mazes to reach a goal at the end of each level. If the player hits walls or other obstacles, it damages the vehicle, but if the player passes through checkpoints, their health will be restored. The idea came from director Masato Toyoshima, who recalled a memory of maneuvering furniture when moving between apartments, and pitched his idea to Nintendo. It was initially conceptualized as a game for the Game Boy Color and Nintendo 64 before the reveal of the Game Boy Advance, remaining in the drafts for two years prior. Yasunari Watanabe served as the sole programmer, and character designs were created by Yōichi Kotabe.

Kuru Kuru Kururin received generally positive reviews, with many critics complimenting its addictive gameplay. The game has sold 265,250 copies in Japan. It was later released in North America for the first time on February 11, 2016 via the Virtual Console service on Wii U. The game was subsequently re-released on the Nintendo Classics service on February 8, 2023. The Kururin series has since been referenced in other video games developed by Eighting, and has been cited as an inspiration by multiple video game developers.

== Gameplay ==
Kururin piloting the Helirin through a gap to reach the goal at the end.

Kuru Kuru Kururin is a puzzle video game played from a top-down perspective. The player controls Kururin, a bird who pilots the Helirin, a constantly spinning helicopter, and must maneuver it through a series of mazes while avoiding walls and other obstacles. Upon hitting an obstacle or wall, the player will lose a heart, with Kururin having three hearts by default. While the rotation speed remains consistent, the player can adjust their movement speed by pressing buttons on the Game Boy Advance. The length of the Helirin can also be changed prior to the start of each level. The single player offers several goals per course, with each course presenting increasing difficulty. By touching a spring, the rotation direction of the Helirin will change.

The game starts with simple training levels, in which players are told how to play and how to get around the first corners. After that, there are three levels in each stage, which get progressively harder and longer. The obstacles and the look of the levels (ice, cave, machine, etc.) vary between stages. Taking damage incurs a time penalty, and losing all lives results in failing the level, requiring the player to restart the level from the beginning. Beginners can play the levels on Easy mode, where the stick is only half of its usual size. For each world, the final level contains one of Kururin's siblings that can be obtained with the Helirin. Upon being collected, they will thank Kururin and return to their family. The Challenge mode contains a collection of fifty levels. These levels can be played against up to four players in the multiplayer Versus mode. Players cannot interact with each other, appearing transparent on their opponent's screens, with the goal being to reach the end.

== Plot ==
When on a walk one day, Kururin's mother loses track of her kids, leading them to be scattered across ten different worlds. Kururin, the eldest of the family, is told by his mother that his brothers and sisters went missing, and it is up to him to find them. Kururin is initially unsure that he is up to the task since he has never left his home world before, but he eventually agrees to rescue his lost family. He is taught by Teacher Hare, a rabbit who trains Kururin in the art of controlling the Helirin, a stick-shaped helicopter that has a slow-spinning propeller. After completing Teacher Hare's lessons, Kururin is given some final advice before setting off on his journey.

== Development ==
Concept artwork of the titular Kururin illustrated by Yōichi Kotabe.

Kuru Kuru Kururin was developed by the Japanese company Eighting, who had previously developed the Bloody Roar series. The title itself is onomatopoeia in the Japanese language, translating to the "sound or shape of an object spinning". This was Eighting's first video game created in partnership with Nintendo. While Eighting had previously worked on multiple arcade video games, employees at the company desired to create a game that was easier to play, citing Tetris as a key inspiration. Director Masato Toyoshima recalled a memory of him carrying long tables whenever he moved apartments, attempting to maneuver the table through the corners of rooms. Since he remembered feeling satisfied after successfully accomplishing these tasks, Toyoshima wondered if he could convert this aspect of his life into a video game concept. A draft was pitched to Hiroshi Sato of Nintendo, who found Toyoshima's idea of a spinning stick interesting, but claimed his colleagues at Nintendo didn't understand the appeal at the time. In their pitch, Eighting described themselves as developers over thirty years old, since they were not the target demographic for the game, but wanted to create something that an older audience could also enjoy.

The game remained as a draft two years prior to its production due to the capabilities of Nintendo's consoles. The Game Boy Color and Nintendo 64 were both considered as platforms, but the lacking technical components of the former and expensive cartridges of the latter did not correlate with the type of game Eighting wanted to create. After the introduction of the Game Boy Advance, Hiroshi Sato drafted a version of the game using assets from the newly announced system, and gave Eighting his proposal to begin development on the project. Nintendo reportedly liked the project, contributing some of its employees to assist the development of Kuru Kuru Kururin, including director Hiroshi Sato. The game was produced by Shinji Hatano and composed by Atsuhiro Motoyama. The sole programmer, Yasunari Watanabe, drafted two versions of the game for arcade and Game Boy Advance, comparing the two for differences in how they controlled and how they looked on various monitors. The controls for the game, along with the rotation speed and length of the Helirin, were finalized after three months of development. Watanabe stated that over 200 courses were created for the game, but not all of them were great, causing the development team to combine different parts of courses together. Since the developers felt they should include something extra, a multiplayer mode was added, making the other players appear as ghosts as to not hinder the gameplay experience of progressing through a level.

To make the game appeal to kids more, the development team decided to create an original character. Yōichi Kotabe worked on the character designs for the game, creating illustrations for Kururin and his family members. He was instructed by Sato to create a pilot of a vehicle, so Kotabe designed the protagonist as a "bird-like animal" with parents. Sato claimed that the character design for Kururin stuck out among Kotabe's other creations, since he would normally create characters based on rabbits or squirrels when working with Nintendo. One of the directors pitched the idea to have all of Kururin's siblings be coordinated to a different color of the rainbow, which Kotabe liked, implementing a colorful and diverse palette to the family. For the father, his crest was designed to represent all of the children's colors. Additionally, Shinichi Ōnishi served as the art director for Kuru Kuru Kururin.

== Release ==
It was first announced at the Nintendo Space World 2000 trade show. It was estimated that the development process was around 60 percent complete while on display. It released on March 21, 2001 in Japan and June 22, 2001 in Europe and Australia. Kuru Kuru Kururin released as a launch title for the Game Boy Advance alongside three other Nintendo-published games, these being F-Zero: Maximum Velocity, Super Mario Advance, and Napoleon in Japan only. An official guidebook titled the "Kuru Kuru Kururin Complete Manual" was published by Famitsu in 2001, which contains level layouts for all levels in the Adventure and Challenge modes. In the official guide book for Nintendo Space World 2000, an icon was displayed indicating the title would be compatible with the Mobile Adapter GB. This, however, was not implemented into the final release. A Chinese version of the game was developed for the iQue Game Boy Advance, but was unreleased. Kuru Kuru Kururin was re-released for the Wii U Virtual Console service on July 16, 2014 in Japan and December 22, 2015 in Europe. Kuru Kuru Kururin released for the first time in North America on February 11, 2016, becoming the first imported title from the Game Boy Advance on Wii U Virtual Console. The game also released on the Nintendo Classics service on February 8, 2023 alongside the launch of the Game Boy Advance online application.

== Reception ==
=== Critical reception ===
Reception

Aggregate score
Aggregator	Score
GameRankings	74%

Review scores
Publication	Score
Computer and Video Games	5/10
Edge	7/10
Eurogamer	9/10
Gamekult	8/10
GameSpot	7.1/10
Jeuxvideo.com	14/20
M! Games	78/100
Nintendo Life	8/10
Nintendo World Report	9/10
Jeux Vidéo Magazine	17/20
Micromanía	15/20

In previews, Kuru Kuru Kururin was received positively. Ty Kris of Nintendojo stated that it shared gameplay qualities with puzzle games such as Tetris, calling it the "perfect pack-in title for the GBA". Jeff Gerstmann of GameSpot, Craig Harris of IGN, and multiple reviewers for Nintendo World Report claimed the gameplay was addictive. Additionally, three Nintendo World Report writers described it as a "must have" Game Boy Advance game to have launch. Harris appreciated the cute character designs and catchy music, calling some of its tunes "downright impressive". Prior to its release, it was named the best handheld game at the ECTS trade show by Gestalt of Eurogamer.

Kuru Kuru Kururin received generally positive reviews from critics. It has been widely compared to the PlayStation video game Irritating Stick (1998). Kurt Kalata of Hardcore Gaming 101 described its inspirations were drawn from the Japanese game show Ucchannanchan no Honō no Challenger: Kore ga Dekitara 100 Man En, the Nintendo 64 video game Ucchannanchan no Honō no Challenger: Denryū Iraira Bō, as well as Irritating Stick. In comparison to the latter game, which Kalata described as obnoxious and "terminally bland", Kuru Kuru Kururin was described to contain "far more interesting" gameplay elements, such as the constantly spinning stick and the variety of obstacles in levels. Eurogamer rated the game a score of 9 out of 10 points. The reviewer lauded the game's learning curve and stated that there would be no other puzzle game on the Game Boy Advance at the time that can "rival Kuru Kuru Kururin for its sheer addictiveness and fun-value". Nintendo World Report gave Kuru Kuru Kururin the same score as Eurogamer and declared that it is "simple enough that anyone can pick this game up and play". The reviewer praised the game's multiplayer mode, which he described as "an absolute blast", as well as its lasting appeal, but also commented that the "cutesy" characters and music would be a turn-off for "a lot of people". Jeff Gerstmann of GameSpot rated Kuru Kuru Kururin 7.1 out of 10 and described its graphics as "simple but effective". He stated that the game is "excellent at filling up small periods of free time with its short, level-based nature". Computer and Video Games was less impressed by the game, rating it 5 out of 10. The reviewer declared the game to be "extremely frustrating" and said that it lacks "the perfect simplicity" of other puzzle games such as Mr. Driller and Tetris. Nonetheless, he also commented that the novel gameplay of Kuru Kuru Kururin "will find many fans" and that the multiplayer mode is "unexpectedly brilliant".

The game was nominated by Eurogamer for Best Designer in their 2002 awards. Greg Howson writing for The Guardian considered it the only original offering of Nintendo's launch titles. In November 2001, writers for Computer and Video Games considered it the seventh best game on the Game Boy Advance, as well as the tenth best puzzle video game of all time.

=== Retrospective reception ===
Contributors to GamesRadar+ considered it one of the best Game Boy Advance games, as well as one of the best puzzle video games, calling it a "maddeningly tricky gem". Graham Russell of Michibiku recommended the title as a European and Japanese import, and Ian C writing for TheGamer believed it deserved more love. When reviewing the Virtual Console games available on Wii U, Jeremy Parish writing for USgamer claimed Kuru Kuru Kururin was an essential title for its surprisingly "addictive and challenging" gameplay. Harvard Liu writing for Digitally Downloaded stated that he kept revisiting the game on the Nintendo Classics service. He opined that Kuru Kuru Kururin was brilliant, with plenty of well crafted levels that created a desire to achieve a better high score. Lucas M. Thomas writing for Nintendo Force described it as a "classic Nintendo challenge" that, while sometimes irritating, provided a great overall experience. He also noted that the English translation was rough, with localized text often having errors.

Nintendo World Report acknowledged that the game has a legacy among its staff members and readers, with critics Casey Gibson, Donald Theriault, and Neal Ronaghan reassessing its quality. Gibson claimed it never punished the player for taking risks when going for faster times, with it containing fun game modes and a great soundtrack. Theriault similarly complimented the soundtrack, as well as the speed of retrying levels and additional rewards in levels. Conversely, Ronaghan viewed it as a disappointment, claiming the screen was too zoomed-in and the levels focused more on trial-and-error. Dave Frear of Nintendo Life described the game as having "colourful and cheery" visuals, terrific and catchy music, with a difficulty level that started a bit too easy, but was fair overall.

=== Sales ===
During its initial launch week, Kuru Kuru Kururin ranked eleventh place on the Famitsu sales charts, selling 57,145 copies in Japan. Among Nintendo's Game Boy Advance launch titles, it performed under Super Mario Advance and F-Zero: Maximum Velocity, but over Napoleon. It was also ranked the eighth best-selling Game Boy Advance game during its launch in Europe. In total, the Japanese version sold 265,250 copies.

== Legacy ==
A sequel, Kururin Paradise, was released in 2002 for the Game Boy Advance. It was exclusive to Japan, even though it had been showcased at E3 2002, the first announcement of a Kururin game for the American market. Another sequel was also released only in Japan for the GameCube in 2004, entitled Kururin Squash!, which became the only title of the series to use 3D computer graphics, as well as to appear on a home console.

Several references to the Kururin series are made in the Super Smash Bros. series. The Helirin makes a cameo appearance as a Trophy in Super Smash Bros. Melee (2001), but is incorrectly referred to as "Heririn" in the American version. The Helirin later appears in Super Smash Bros. Brawl (2008) as an Assist Trophy. Unlike most Assist Trophies, it doesn't attack, but it becomes part of the stage, and can be used as a platform or a wall. Several other characters and vehicles in the Kururin series appear as Trophies and Stickers in the game. In Super Smash Bros. Ultimate (2018), the Helirin appears as a collectable Spirit. A patent from 2012 on multiplayer for the Wii U revealed an example video game similar to Kuru Kuru Kururin. Elements from Kuru Kuru Kururin have also made cameo appearances in some of Eighting's other developed titles. One of the characters introduced in Kururin Paradise appears in Master of Illusion (2006) on the Nintendo DS. The cartridge for Kuru Kuru Kururin also appears in Pikmin 4 (2023) as a collectable Treasure. In a 2023 interview, James Montagna, director of games such as Mighty Milky Way (2011) and Advance Wars 1+2: Re-Boot Camp (2023) at WayForward, expressed interest in creating a new entry in the Kururin series. He also claimed that the gameplay of Kuru Kuru Kururin inspired the creation of Vitamin Connection (2020). Kururin has also been labeled as an inspiration for multiple indie games, including Roundabout (2014), Spinny's Journey (2021), and Spinfrog: All Aboard The Frogcopter (2022).
