= Kururin Squash! =

2004 video game

- Developer: Eighting
- Publisher: Nintendo
- Directors: Shinji Hatano; Tomonori Fujisawa
- Producers: Hiroshi Sato; Masato Toyoshima
- Artists: Nanako Kinoshita; Tomomi Sano; Ryuusuke Yoshida; Takayoshi Matsui
- Composer: Atsuhiro Motoyama
- Series: Kururin
- Platform: GameCube
- Release: JP: October 14, 2004
- Genres: Puzzle, action
- Modes: Single-player, multiplayer

Kururin Squash! (Note: Japanese: くるりんスカッシュ!, Hepburn: Kururin Sukasshu!) is a 2004 puzzle video game developed by Eighting and published by Nintendo for the GameCube. It was released exclusively in Japan on October 14, 2004. Kururin Squash! is the third and final game in the Kururin series as well as the first entry on a home console, following the release of Kuru Kuru Kururin (2001) and Kururin Paradise (2002) on the Game Boy Advance. The game uses 3D graphics, with 2D artwork of its characters being used on cardboard cutouts outside of gameplay.

Kururin Squash! is a maze navigation game where the player attempts to reach the goal at the end for a high score. It introduces coins, enemies, and bosses in its levels, with multiple new vehicles being used to overcome specific obstacles. Kururin Squash! received generally positive reviews from critics for its gameplay, visuals, and style, with mixed opinions on its difficulty. It is considered to be one of the best Japanese-exclusive GameCube games; however, selling less than 20,000 copies, it is the lowest-selling Kururin game, and it is Nintendo's second worst-performing GameCube game in Japan.

== Gameplay ==
Kururin piloting the Helibokaan during the boss fight against Professor Isogashima in the first world.

The player controls Kururin, a bird who pilots the Helirin, a constantly spinning helicopter, by navigating mazes while avoiding walls and other obstacles. The player can hold down buttons on the GameCube controller to adjust the speed at which the Helirin spins and the speed of the Helirin itself. Kururin has three hearts by default, and each stage contains checkpoints where their hearts can be refilled. If the player hits any obstacles, they lose a heart, and three seconds are added to the in-game timer, with the goal being to complete each stage in the least amount of time for a high score. In the single-player mode, the player can select whether to control a larger or more compact Helirin, a method of adjusting difficulty. Two modes are available from the start, the Adventure mode with the stages and story, as well as a Challenge mode where the player attempts to complete the stages as fast as possible. After completing the Adventure mode, a third mode is unlocked where the player controls the center sphere of the Helirin, which does not feature the rotating helicopter blades, but can't stop moving. After completing this mode, the Extra mode is unlocked, featuring rotated versions of the stages.

Kururin Squash! introduces new vehicles, enemies in stages, and boss fights at the end of each world. The "Action Helirins" are helicopters that provide various advantages the standard Helirin does not. One of these vehicles is the Helibokaan, which is a helicopter that can break obstacles and punch enemies. The Helibashan can dive underwater to avoid obstacles on the surface, the Heliboboh can shoot fire when attached to rails, the Heliburuun can create whirlwinds, and the Helibibyuun can shoot objects using rapid fire. Additional vehicles can be purchased in shops that change the design of the Helirin, such as one with the Nintendo logo that plays the coin sound effect from Super Mario Bros. if the player honks their horn. The single-player modes feature several unique worlds, with every few stages taking place in a new environment. Coins are present in every stage, and collecting all the coins will net the player a perfect bonus, increasing their total coin counter. Coins can be used in shops, which contain many useful items and accessories. These items can increase the player's hearts, respawn them at the beginning after they lose their hearts, or provide a minimap for stages. The shop also contains movies that can guide the player on how to complete individual levels, with shops being run by members of the Magic Group, the false antagonists from Kururin Paradise.

The multiplayer in Kururin Squash! has two modes that support up to four players. The Race Mode has over forty obstacle courses where players attempt to reach the end while hitting opponents into walls or blocking their opponents' vehicles, taking place on stages from the Challenge mode. In the Battle Mode, players can fight on ten unique stages by using power-ups and weapons that is similar to minigames from Super Monkey Ball. The objective for this mode is to collect the most coins while attacking other players. By connecting a GameCube – Game Boy Advance link cable, up to four Game Boy Advance systems can play a spot the difference-type quiz game, which can be purchased from the shop.

== Plot ==
The story is told through a paper puppet theater style, which received praise from critics.

After Kururin wins the lottery for his family, they travel across the four continents of the world. However, upon arriving back to their home in Kururin Village, only the parents of the family return. After losing track of his family members, Kururin goes on an adventure to find them across the four continents. Throughout the journey, Kururin's guide, Teacher Hare, provides him with new Action Helirins that help him progress through the different worlds. Kururin travels to face Professor Isogashima, a mad inventor bird who has captured all the members of his family since they interfered with his research, and he releases them after being defeated in boss battles. Professor Isogashima and his Isogashimachines serve as the main antagonists with the goal of making everyone else busy. Once Kururin returns home after rescuing his siblings, he discovers that his parents were also kidnapped by Professor Isogashima, so he travels to the fifth and final world in space to rescue them. When defeated, Professor Isogashima crash lands on their home planet, makes himself busy by fixing the problems caused by his Isogashimachines, and the Kururin family returns home.

== Development ==
Kururin Squash! was developed by Eighting, and was the first game in the Kururin series to transition from 2D to 3D computer graphics. The directors and producers from Kururin Paradise returned to work on Kururin Squash! as the final entry in the series. Yōichi Kotabe returns as the series' character designer, with it being the final game he serves that role at Nintendo prior to his departure from the company in 2007. It was officially revealed in an issue of Famitsu magazine on August 5, 2004, and later released on October 14, 2004. It had a small advertising campaign, with a publication in a column of Nintendo Dream and commercials that used the Helirin as a prop. In a developer interview with Yuichi Toyama and Kenichi Yokoo for Sōkyūgurentai and Mahou Daisakusen, Yokoo cited Kururin Squash! as his favorite non-arcade game he worked on. Eighting would later collaborate with Nintendo on the Nintendo DS game Master of Illusion in 2006.

== Reception ==
Reception

Review scores
Publication	Score
Edge	6/10
Eurogamer	7/10
Famitsu	8/10, 6/10, 7/10, 8/10; 8/10, 8/10, 8/10, 9/10
GamesTM	6/10; 78%
Nintendo World Report	9.5/10
Dengeki Gamecube	7.7/10
Kikizo	8.5/10
Nintendojo	9/10

Kururin Squash! received generally positive reviews, with praise for the 3D visuals, music, as well as improved gameplay and controls from its predecessors. The art style received praise, with colorful 3D environments and stylized cutscenes represented by cardboard puppets on sticks, creating a unique and refreshing style. The multiplayer modes were also complimented for their quality. Caleb Gossler of Nintendojo claimed Kururin Squash! to have "some of the best four-player party games on the GameCube". Chandra Nair of GamesTM described the levels as "cunningly designed", complimenting them for taking advantage of the different abilities of the Action Helirins. Ben Kosmina of Nintendo World Report described the overall experience as stellar, complimenting the title for having a low language barrier to enjoy the gameplay, despite its exclusivity to Japan. Similarly, Nadia Grace Mullings of Game Rant claimed it to be "worthy of being one of the best GameCube titles, despite it having never been released in America". Anoop Gantayat of IGN expressed interest in Kururin Squash! releasing overseas due to the addictive gameplay, even if there were no plans to do so by Nintendo of America. The low price was also praised, with Edge magazine describing the price point as enticing.

The main criticism of Kururin Squash! was its difficulty and short length. In comparison to the Game Boy Advance titles which featured more challenging stages, Kururin Squash! contains generally easier levels that could be completed faster due to the improvement in movement accuracy, as a result of switching from a d-pad to the GameCube control stick. Despite this critique, others have claimed the difficulty level is still present. Jonti Davies of Kikizo described the gameplay as "straightforward in principle, but, in later stages especially, often devilishly difficult in practice". Ollie Reynolds of Nintendo Life shared this sentiment, noting how navigating the mazes can become "incredibly tense" as the player progresses. Eurogamer later retracted this criticism, with Keza MacDonald stating that it hardly affects the overall experience, considering Kururin Squash! a cult classic on the GameCube. Additionally, critics were disappointed by the lack of multiplayer modes, in comparison to the multiple minigames introduced in Kururin Paradise. Ben Kosmina of Nintendo World Report considered the fewer number of multiplayer offerings disappointing. Writers for Edge magazine claimed the sixteen minigames from Kururin Paradise were better than having only two in Kururin Squash!, with the Game Boy Advance link cable minigame being referred to as "no more than a novelty". In retrospective reviews, Kururin Squash! has been cited as one of the best Japanese-exclusive GameCube games, with many desiring an English localization.

=== Sales ===
In Japan, Kururin Squash! reached the eighteenth position on sales charts during its initial launch week, selling 5,745 copies. It only placed among the top thirty weekly video game sales one additional time the following week. Kururin Squash! sold a total of 18,562 copies in Japan from release to December 20, 2004. It was the third lowest-selling GameCube game in 2004 and the second lowest-selling first-party game behind Eternal Darkness: Sanity's Requiem, subsequently making it the lowest-selling entry in the Kururin series, despite being sold at a budget price comparative to other GameCube titles.
