= Kururin Paradise =

2002 video game

- Developer: Eighting
- Publisher: Nintendo
- Directors: Shinji Hatano; Tomonori Fujisawa
- Producers: Hiroshi Sato; Masato Toyoshima
- Programmer: Yasunari Watanabe
- Composer: Atsuhiro Motoyama
- Series: Kururin
- Platform: Game Boy Advance
- Release: JP: December 6, 2002
- Genre: Puzzle
- Modes: Single-player, multiplayer

Kururin Paradise (Note: Japanese: くるりんパラダイス, Hepburn: Kururin Paradaisu) is a 2002 puzzle video game developed by Eighting and published by Nintendo for the Game Boy Advance. It is the second entry in the Kururin series and the sequel to Kuru Kuru Kururin (2001), and was released exclusively in Japan on December 6, 2002. A North American release of the game was planned and revealed at E3, but later canceled. The player controls Kururin in a constantly spinning helicopter, navigating through mazes to rescue members of his family, who he assumes were kidnapped by a group of traveling magicians. It introduces alternate paths that can be unlocked by finding keys in levels, which unlock additional levels. Additionally, a selection of sixteen minigames can be played in single-player and multiplayer.

The game received generally positive reviews, with praise for its introduction of new gameplay mechanics and minigames. It was also praised for its increased difficulty, being considered an improvement over the first entry in the series. Kururin Paradise was followed by Kururin Squash! on the GameCube in 2004, and was later re-released on Wii U Virtual Console on December 9, 2015, also exclusive to Japan. The game received its first international release through the Nintendo Classics service on October 14, 2026.

== Gameplay ==
Kururin piloting the Helirin through a maze to collect a key.

Similar to the first entry, Kururin Paradise is a maze navigation puzzle game. The player pilots Kururin in the Helirin, a helicopter that continuously spins as the player attempts to traverse through mazes to reach the goal at the end. If Kururin loses all three hearts in a level, it is restarted from the beginning. New to Kururin Paradise, the player can use the right shoulder button to speed up the rotation of the Helirin, with the left shoulder button changing its color. The Adventure mode contains the game's story with thirty-four levels, some of which are accessed by unlocking alternate paths, and the Challenge mode contains thirty levels with the goal of reaching the goal as fast as possible.

Four players in the multiplayer mode playing the minigame "In The Sky" involving Kururin flying solo from his helicopter.

Kururin Paradise introduces several new gameplay mechanics, including alternate paths and minigames. Keys can be obtained in levels, which unlock secret alternate routes inside a previously completed level. When the alternate route is completed, a new level is unlocked on the world map, leading to a path containing other new levels. Levels take place in a variety of different locations and contain new obstacles the player must avoid. Some of these levels include the inside of a clock, where Kururin must avoid the clock's hands, as well as a graveyard setting, where ghosts will slow down the rotation of the Helirin. Other obstacles include cannons, flying swords, and moving blocks that damage the Helirin when touched. In the Adventure mode, boss battles take place at the end of each world, but appear in the form of minigames. Sixteen minigames are included in the "Mini-Game Paradise" mode, all of which can be played in multiplayer with up to four players using the Game Boy Advance Game Link Cable. A majority of the minigames are based on achieving a high score or surviving a challenge given a certain time limit. One minigame titled "In The Sky" features Kururin outside of the Helirin flying in a side-scrolling stage similar to the Balloon Trip mode in Balloon Fight, where the player must control the bird to avoid obstacles. The dedicated multiplayer modes similarly support up to four players. A racing mode from the original game returns, with players competing against each other to reach the end of a maze in the Challenge mode. Players can give themselves a handicap by increasing the length of their vehicle or remove hearts from their character to accommodate the skills of different players.

Kururin Paradise teaches the player various magic tricks that can be performed with the Game Boy Advance system, which are obtained by defeating bosses. Each magic trick has an explanation on how to perform them for others, and after selecting the magic trick, the player must turn their system off and back on to activate it. One of the magic tricks is a Love Tester, which references the Nintendo product of the same name.

== Plot ==
Kappado, Tenko, Naporon, and Baron Magic of the Magic Group visit Kururin Village to put on a show. While Kururin's family leave to see the Magic Group perform, Kururin oversleeps, arriving late to discover an empty venue. Assuming the Magic Group kidnapped his family and his instructor Teacher Hare with villainous intent, Kururin sets out on an adventure to rescue them. When first encountering Kappado, he reveals that Kururin's family want to learn magic tricks from the Magic Group, and Kururin has to get them back by beating members of the Magic Group in a minigame. After rescuing his father Totorin, it is revealed that Totorin was the leader of the Magic Group, as he wanted to teach Kururin the enjoyment that comes from learning magic. In the end, everyone surprises Kururin by celebrating his birthday.

== Development and release ==
Kururin Paradise was revealed to be in development in May 2002 prior to its appearance at E3 2002. The previous directors at Eighting, Hiroshi Sato and Masato Toyoshima, returned as the game's producers. Shinji Hatano, the producer of Kuru Kuru Kururin, became one of the directors alongside Tomonori Fujisawa. Additionally, character designer Yōichi Kotabe worked with Yoshitaka Ikeda to create the members of the Magic Group. The game was announced in Japanese and North American markets, with no word of it receiving a European release. An English-translated version of the game was showcased at E3 2002, the first time a game in the Kururin series was announced in the North American market. This version of the game was never released, and was canceled at a later date. Kururin Paradise released exclusively in Japan on December 6, 2002. A Chinese version of the game was developed for the iQue Game Boy Advance, but was unreleased. Kururin Paradise was re-released on Wii U Virtual Console on December 9, 2015 and via the Nintendo Classics service on October 14, 2026, the latter marking the game's first release outside of Japan. One of the members in the Magic Group, Naporon, makes a cameo appearance in the Eighting-developed Master of Illusion on Nintendo DS.

== Reception ==
Reception

Review scores
| Publication | Score |
|---|---|
| Famitsu | 29/40 |
| Planet Gameboy.de | 81% |

The game received generally positive reviews. Famitsu gave Kururin Paradise a rating of 29/40, and Planet Gameboy.de, a website powered by 4Players, rated it 81%, considering the game an overall improvement from its predecessor. Critics praised the graphics, as well as the abundance of inventive minigames in both single-player and multiplayer modes.

Bastian Karweg writing for Planet Gameboy.de described the game as much more difficult than Kuru Kuru Kururin, sometimes requiring split-second precision and perfect timing to navigate the mazes. Regarding the game's difficulty, Kurt Kalata of Hardcore Gaming 101 wrote "[i]t's definitely meant for veterans of the first game, but it's ultimately a much more satisfying experience", relating to the added depth in the level design. One Famitsu reviewer described the frustration of navigating tight spaces to be offset by a sense of accomplishment when completing a level, while another reviewer complimented the exquisite level layout for allowing the player to complete seemingly impossible tasks. Tom Bramwell writing for Eurogamer recommended the title over its sequel, Kururin Squash!, citing the game's increased difficulty as a strength. Additionally, when comparing the game to Kururin Squash!, Ben Kosmina of Nintendo World Report described how the multiplayer content and "secret branching paths" were some of the highlights in Kururin Paradise.

Kalata praised the graphics as an improvement over Kuru Kuru Kururin for their pastel and cel-shaded look, describing the visual style as "a cartoon come to life". Karweg described the game as very colorful and atmospheric with "beautiful 2D graphics". Daniel Bloodworth of Nintendo World Report complimented the game's art style, citing it as "cleaner, more colorful and has a specifically hand-drawn look". Bloodworth also highlighted certain minigames such as "Mowrin" for being a particularly clever use of the series' gameplay formula in minigame format. The Mexican Club Nintendo magazine claimed it to be "one of the simplest and most addictive games" they have played. In a retrospective review, Rudy Lavaux of Cubed3 described it as one of the best Japanese-exclusive Game Boy Advance games, being a faster game than Kuru Kuru Kururin that focused more on planning ahead and using quick reflexes. In an interview, WayForward director James Montagna called Kururin Paradise among one of his top five favorite video games, with the series inspiring the creation of Vitamin Connection (2020) on Nintendo Switch.

=== Sales ===
The game sold 3,508 copies after three days. During its initial launch week, it sold 7,801 copies, marking the only time it would appear among the top thirty Japanese game sales. Kururin Paradise sold a total of 80,404 copies in Japan from release to December 22, 2003. It was the twenty-sixth best-selling Game Boy Advance game in Japan released in 2002, and the seventieth best-selling game overall in Japan.
