= IQue =

Chinese joint venture between Wei Yen and Nintendo

iQue, Ltd.

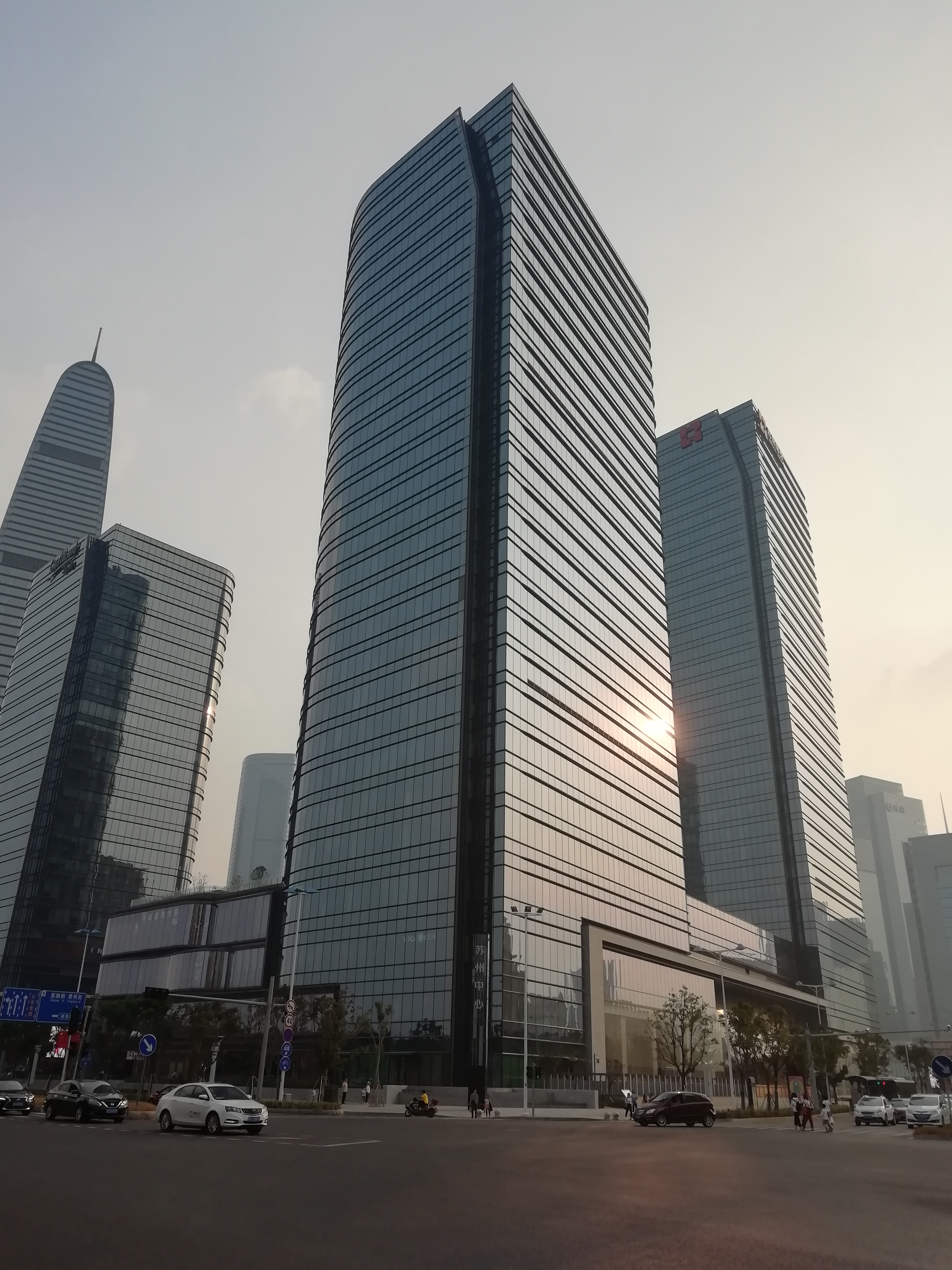
- Headquarters in Suzhou, China
- Native name: 神游科技(中国)有限公司
- Romanized name: Shényóu Kējì (Zhōngguó) Yǒuxiàn Gōngsī
- Type: Subsidiary
- Industry: Video games
- Founded: 6 December 2002; 23 years ago
- Founder: Nintendo; Wei Yen
- Headquarters: Suzhou Center Building C 6F R1004, Suzhou, China
- Services: Software translation and localization Game development
- Parent: Nintendo (2013–present)
- Website: www.ique.com

iQue, Ltd. (simplified Chinese: 神游科技; traditional Chinese: 神遊科技; pinyin: Shényóu Kējì) is a Chinese video game localization and development company located in Suzhou. It was founded in 2002 as a joint venture between Taiwanese-American engineer Wei Yen and Nintendo to manufacture and distribute Nintendo hardware and software for mainland China.

iQue released the iQue Player in 2003 and went on to distribute several Nintendo handheld systems under the iQue brand. By 2013, the company became a wholly owned subsidiary of Nintendo and later shifted its focus away from hardware to localization, technical support, and internal development work.

Its Chinese name, Shényóu, is a double entendre meaning "to make a mental journey".

== History ==
Nintendo established iQue in December 2002 as a joint venture with Wei Yen, a veteran of earlier Nintendo hardware collaborations. Yen had previously served as senior vice president at Silicon Graphics, where he contributed to Project Reality, the hardware project that became the Nintendo 64. After leaving SGI, Yen founded BroadOn, which developed the cryptographic security system used in the iQue Player to deter piracy.

The company introduced its first product, the iQue Player, in 2003. The system adopted a handheld TV game format in part to comply with a 2000 Ministry of Culture ban on the sale of traditional home video game consoles. In the following years, iQue distributed official Nintendo products for the mainland Chinese market, focusing primarily on handheld systems, which were not subject to the same ban. While Nintendo and iQue initially planned to release the Wii across mainland China, these plans were ultimately scaled back, and the iQue Player was the company's only home console released in China.

By 2013, iQue became a wholly-owned subsidiary of Nintendo. During the early 2010s, iQue contributed to emulator development for Nintendo's Virtual Console services, including NES and Game Boy emulation on Nintendo 3DS and Nintendo 64 emulation on Wii U. The company later supported development of the Nintendo 64 emulator used for Nintendo Switch Online.

Starting from 2017, Nintendo wound down distribution of older hardware under the iQue brand. Nintendo partnered with Tencent to introduce the Nintendo Switch in mainland China in 2019. iQue shifted to providing customer support for legacy products and began localizing Nintendo titles into Simplified Chinese, while Nintendo Hong Kong handled Traditional Chinese.

In 2019, iQue began hiring programmers and developers, transitioning to be a QA office for Nintendo.

== Consoles ==
=== iQue Player ===
The iQue Player is a handheld TV game variant of the Nintendo 64. It was designed to bypass China's ban on home consoles at the time and to combat game piracy in the market. A total of 14 games were released for the console.

=== Game Boy Advance ===
An iQue variant of the Game Boy Advance was released on 8 June 2004. Its revisions were also released under the iQue brand; the Game Boy Advance SP was released in October 2004, and the Game Boy Micro was released in October 2005.

Eight games were released for the Game Boy Advance. Twelve more games were planned, but cancelled due to high piracy of the system.

English title	Chinese title	Pinyin	Release date	Genre
Wario Land 4	瓦力欧寻宝记	Wǎlìōu Xúnbǎo Jì	June 2004	Platformer
Super Mario Advance	超级马力欧2	Chāojí Mǎlìōu 2	30 June 2004	Platformer
Metroid: Zero Mission	密特罗德：零点任务	Mìtèluōdé: Língdiǎn Rènwù	15 June 2005	Shooter
WarioWare, Inc.: Mega Microgames!	瓦力欧制造	Wǎlìōu Zhìzào	4 July 2005	Minigames
Metroid Fusion	密特罗德 融合	Mìtèluōdé Rónghé	2 March 2006	Shooter
Yoshi's Island – Super Mario Advance 3	耀西岛	Yàoxi Dǎo	2 March 2006	Platformer
Super Mario World – Super Mario Advance 2	超级马力欧世界	Chāojí Mǎlìōu Shìjiè	15 March 2006	Platformer
F-Zero: Maximum Velocity	极速F-ZERO未来赛车	Jísù F-ZERO Wèilái Sàichē	August 2007	Racing
Advance Wars	陆海空大战	Lùhǎikōng Dàzhàn	Unreleased	Strategy
Densetsu no Starfy	斯塔非的传说	Sītǎfēi de Chuánshuō	Unreleased	Platformer
Densetsu no Starfy 2	斯塔非的传说2	Sītǎfēi de Chuánshuō 2	Unreleased	Platformer
DK: King of Swing	摇摆森喜刚	Yáobǎi Sēn Xǐgāng	Unreleased	Puzzle
Famicom Mini Collection	红白机合集	Hóngbái Jīhéjí	Unreleased	Compilation
Fire Emblem: The Binding Blade	火纹战记: 封印之剑	Huǒwén Zhànjì: Fēngyìn Zhījiàn	Unreleased	Role-playing
Kuru Kuru Kururin	转转棒	Zhuǎn Zhuǎn Bàng	Unreleased	Puzzle
Kururin Paradise	转转棒天堂	Zhuǎn Zhuǎn Bàng Tiāntáng	Unreleased	Puzzle
Mario & Luigi: Superstar Saga	马力欧与路易吉RPG	Mǎlìōu Yǔ Lùyìjí RPG	Unreleased	Role-playing
Mario Kart: Super Circuit	马力欧卡丁车超级赛道	Mǎlìōu Kǎdīngchē Chāojí Sài Dào	Unreleased	Racing
Polarium Advance	通勤一笔	Tōngqín Yī Bǐ	Unreleased	Puzzle
Tomato Adventure	番茄酱王国大冒险	Fānqié Jiàng Wángguó dà Màoxiǎn	Unreleased	Role-playing

=== iQue DS ===
The iQue DS is a variant of the Nintendo DS. It was released on 23 July 2005. Six games were released for the console. Unlike in other regions, iQue DS games are region locked, preventing them from being played on DS systems from other regions. Some DS revisions were released under the iQue brand; the Nintendo DS Lite was released on 26 June 2006, and the Nintendo DSi was released in December 2009. The latter was bundled with Nintendogs and a gift card with 1,000 DSiWare points, allowing users to download software.

English title	Chinese title	Pinyin	Release date	Genre	Media
Polarium	直感一笔	Zhígǎn Yī Bǐ	23 July 2005	Puzzle	Physical
WarioWare: Touched!	摸摸瓦力欧制造	Mō Mō Wǎlìōu Zhìzào	23 July 2005	Minigames	Physical
Yoshi Touch & Go	摸摸耀西-云中漫步	Mō Mō Yàoxi – Yún Zhōng Mànbù	14 February 2006	Platformer	Physical
Super Mario 64 DS	神游马力欧DS	Shényóu Mǎlìōu DS	21 June 2007	Platformer	Physical
New Super Mario Bros.	New 超级马力欧兄弟	New Chāojí Mǎlìōu Xiōngdì	2 July 2009	Platformer	Physical
Nintendogs	任天狗狗	Rèntiān Gǒu Gǒu	December 2009	Simulation	Pre-installed on iQue DSi
Big Brain Academy	大脑科学院	Dànǎo kēxuéyuàn	Unreleased	Edutainment	Unreleased

=== iQue 3DS XL ===
The iQue 3DS XL is a variant of the Nintendo 3DS XL. It was the only version of the 3DS offered by iQue. Unlike the Nintendo 3DS XL from other regions, the iQue 3DS XL cannot access the Nintendo eShop, transfer save data between systems, or play DSiWare. Only two games were released for the console, both of which were pre-installed on every console made. No physical game cards were ever made.

English title	Chinese title	Pinyin	Release date
Super Mario 3D Land	超级马力欧 3D乐园	Chāojí Mǎlìōu 3D Lèyuán	7 December 2012
Mario Kart 7	马力欧卡丁车7	Mǎlìōu Kǎdīngchē 7	7 December 2012

Due to its regional lockout, the iQue 3DS XL is only compatible with games that were localized in Simplified Chinese. As a result, an additional 14 games can be played on the console.

English title	Chinese title	Pinyin
The Legend of Zelda: Ocarina of Time 3D	塞尔达传说 时光之笛 3D	Sàiěrdá Chuánshuō: Shíguāng zhī Dí 3D
Nintendogs + Cats	任天狗狗+猫猫	Rèntiān Gǒugou + Māomāo
Star Fox 64 3D	星际火狐64 3D	Xīngjì Huǒhú 64 3D
Mario Tennis Open	马力欧网球 公开赛	Mǎlìōu Wǎngqiú Gōngkāisài
New Super Mario Bros. 2	新超级马力欧兄弟 2	Xīn Chāojí Mǎlìōu Xiōngdì 2
Brain Age: Concentration Training	脑科学专家 川岛隆太博士监修 突破极限 脑的5分钟魔鬼锻炼	Nǎokēxué Zhuānjiā Chuāndǎolóngtài Bóshì Jiānxiū Tūpò Jíxiàn Nǎo de 5 Fēnzhōng Móguǐ Duànliàn
Luigi's Mansion: Dark Moon	路易吉洋馆2	Lùyìjí Yángguǎn 2
Paper Mario: Sticker Star	纸片马力欧 超级贴纸	Zhǐpiàn Mǎlìōu Chāojí Tiēzhǐ
Pokémon Sun and Moon	精灵宝可梦 太阳/月亮	Jīnglíng Bǎokěmèng Tàiyáng / Yuèliang
Pokémon Ultra Sun and Ultra Moon	精灵宝可梦 究极之日 /究极之月	Jīnglíng Bǎokěmèng Jiūjí-zhī Rì / Jiūjí-zhī Yuè
