= Play Novel Silent Hill =

2001 video game

- Box art
- Developers: KCE Tokyo; Will
- Publisher: Konami
- Director: Mitsuo Hasunuma
- Producer: Shogo Kumasaka
- Composers: Noisy Croak; Will Music
- Series: Silent Hill
- Platform: Game Boy Advance
- Release: JP: March 21, 2001
- Genre: Visual novel
- Mode: Single-player

Play Novel Silent Hill (Note: Japanese: プレイノベル サイレントヒル, Hepburn: Pureinoberu Sairento Hiru) is a visual novel for the Game Boy Advance. It was released on March 21, 2001, only in Japan, as one of the GBA's launch titles. The game serves as a novelized adaptation of Konami's Silent Hill (1999), released for the PlayStation. The story centers on Harry Mason, who arrives in the cursed town of Silent Hill, and while seeking his missing daughter through the town, stumbles upon a cult conducting a rite to revive a deity it worships.

As a visual novel, Play Novel Silent Hill has the player reading the story through text presented over images. The player can then select options to control the narrative in the story, with some choices leading to changes that differ greatly from the original game. The story is interspersed with mini-games. On completion of a playthrough with Harry's story, a new story option is opened. The player can then switch to the perspective of Cybil Bennett, who Harry encounters in the original game.

Play Novel Silent Hill has received lukewarm reviews since its release from Famitsu, Nintendo Life and Hardcore Gaming 101 debating on the narrative's engagement being a remake and the mixed nature of its graphic presentation. Several fan translations and ports have been released in English since its release.

== Gameplay ==
In Play Novel Silent Hill, the game is a visual novel which features text over graphics telling the story of the game and having the player make choices that effect how the story plays out.

Play Novel Silent Hill is a visual novel. Like other games in the genre, text is imposed over images as the player reads the story. In Play Novel Silent Hill, they choose from options that appear as the story progresses to advance the story, such as like how to engage a monster or which way to follow Cheryl. The story changes depending on the choices the player makes. Some choices greatly affect the path of the story while others cause very minor changes. Interspersed between these text options is the occasional mini-game, such as sliding tile styled games.

After completing the story from the perspective of Harry Mason, the player can select Cybil Bennett's scenario during a new play session. Using the Mobile Adapter GB, players can play an additional scenario called "Boy's Story", where the player can view the story from the point of view of a boy named Andy.

== Plot ==
Harry's scenario follows the events of the first Silent Hill game the closest and is narrated from his perspective. Harry arrives in Silent Hill, a North Eastern town in the United States; he wakes up in his car to a cold breeze and finds that his daughter that should be in the passenger seat next to him is missing. On seeking her out he walks into a shadowy alley and appears to be attacked by unknown forces. He wakes up in a café, where he meets Cybil Bennett, a police officer who offers him a gun for self-defense. After she leaves, Harry hears a strange sound, on investigating a monster breaks through a window, he eventually fires at it leaving it to fall to the ground, confirming that these creatures he's seeing are real.

Harry continues to explore, finding a note he presumes is left by Cheryl that guides him to a school. Various choices from this point change the ending of the story, leading to endings that leave characters such as Cybil dead. 28 endings were created between the Cybil and Harry scenarios. These endings cover a host of different situations that could unfold if key moments in the original game not occurred as they had.

The third scenario involves Andy, who is Cheryl's classmate and neighbor who hides in Harry's Jeep and also appears in Cybil's scenario.

== Development ==
Play Novel Silent Hill was announced by Famitsu on their website in August 2000. The game was developed under the working title of Silent Hill AGB. The story of Play Novel Silent Hill is based on the event that take place in Konami's PlayStation game Silent Hill (1999). Some of the background graphics in Play Novel Silent Hill are taken directly from the original full motion video (FMV) sequences from the original game, while others are new renders made specifically for the Game Boy Advance game. Akihiro Imamura, the programmer of Silent Hill and producer of Silent Hill 2 (2001) said that he had a small role in Play Novel's development by checking in on the script and viewing the final version, but that his game was made by a different team. The game was developed by Will Corporation and KCE Tokyo. KCE Tokyo was one of Konami's main development studios when the company split up its development division in April 1995.

The narrative in Andy's story was going to be told in four chapters, but only the first was released and as of 2021 remains lost. This was due to the Mobile System GB only storing information temporarily in memory and vanishing once the system was turned off. All information of these chapters originates through fan translations of the game and the game's official strategy guide.

== Release ==
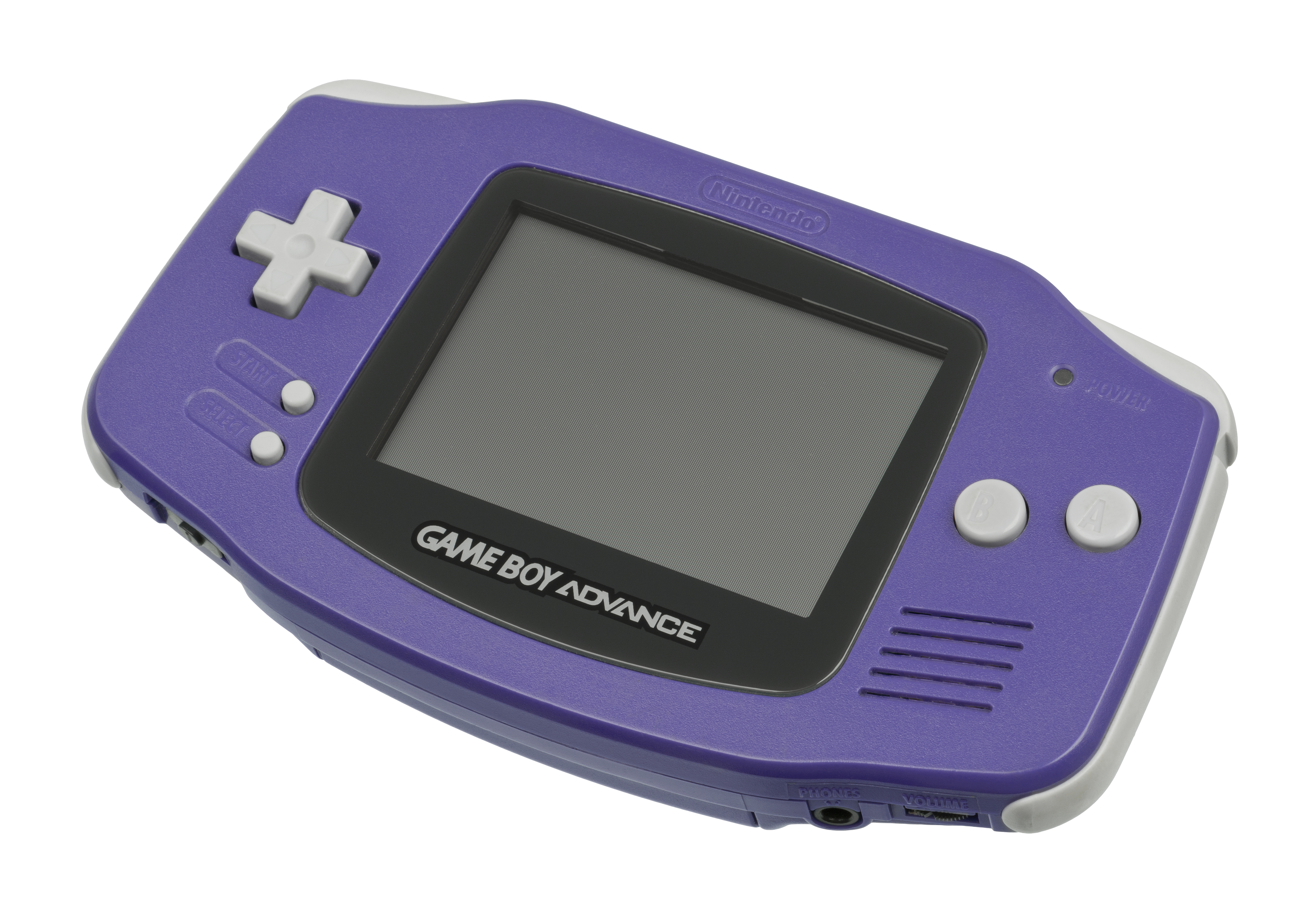
Play Novel Silent Hill was one of the launch titles for the Game Boy Advance in Japan on its release in March 21, 2001.

Throughout the late 1990s, English-language audiences in the West would play Japanese games in Japanese role-playing games, fighting games, and survival horror games. Aside from the occasional erotic game, there were no Japanese visual novels released for English-language audiences the 1990s and early 2000s.

The game was shown at the Nintendo Space World 2000 event held at Makuhari Messe in Chiba between August 25th and 27th. Play Novel Silent Hill was initially presented on 60 of the 140 Game Boy Advance systems on display. Craig Harris of IGN described the game as the least impressive as a showcase for the Game Boy Advance hardware on display and said that Nintendo would promptly remove 50 of the Silent Hill cartridges from display and replace them with Pinobee: Wings of Adventure (2001). Max Lake of Nintendo World Report and Harris described the preview of the game as appearing dull, with Lake writing that "Japanese gamers may go in for this sort of game, though US gamers almost certainly will not."

Play Novel: Silent Hill was released for the Game Boy Advance in Japan on March 21, 2001 and was one of the launch titles for the handheld system. The game never received an official commercial release in English. In 2008, a fan translation guide was made available covering both Harry and Cybil's scenarios. A patch was released in 2021 that allowed that was still in its beta stages that placed the older translation into the game. Fan ports were also developed using the same translation such a recreation of the game using TyranoBuilder engine and a demake made for the Sega Genesis.

== Reception ==
Reception

Review scores
Publication	Score
Famitsu	8/10, 6/10, 6/10, 6/10
Nintendo Life	6/10

In the Japanese magazine Famitsu, the four reviewers complimented the ability to see the narrative from both Cybil and Harry's point of view. One reviewer founding the narrative fascinating while one other said the text did not stimulate the imagination while a third say it lacked freshness for those who have played the original game. Other reviewers complimented the graphics and ease-of-use with it use of flowcharts to re-navigate the narrative paths.

In retrospective reviews, Dave Frear of Nintendo Life complimented the visuals of characters and varied locations as impressive, while saying a little too often the player just sees text on a black screen that "just seems lazy." Frear also found that the puzzles show up so irregularly that they came off as an annoying distraction.

Evan Tysinger of Hardcore Gaming 101 said the attempt to adapt the horror atmosphere of the PlayStation Silent Hill game to a portable game console was a "mixed success." Tysinger found visuals that that tried to represent full-motion video (FMV) looked grainy and muddled, the game sounded more interestesting with quality sound effects saying it achieved more atmosphere with its sound than its visuals.

== See also ==
- 2001 in video games
- List of Game Boy Advance games
- List of Konami games
