= Mobile Adapter GB =

Game Boy accessory

Mobile Adapter GB Mobile System GB
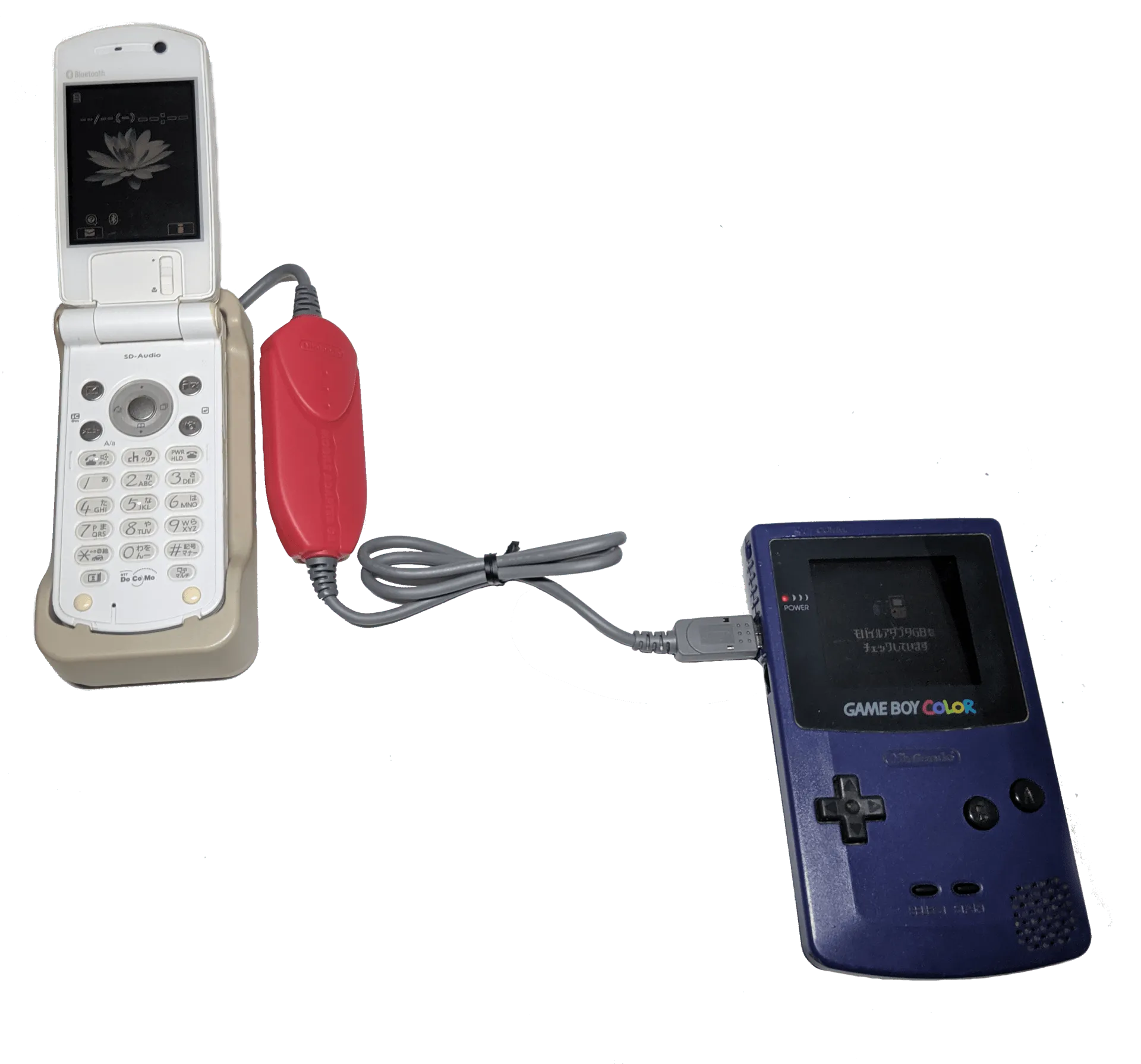
- Mobile Adapter GB connecting a Game Boy Color and mobile phone
- Developer: Nintendo, KDDI
- Type: Online service
- Launched: JP: 27 January 2001
- Discontinued: 18 December 2002
- Platforms: Game Boy Color; Game Boy Advance
- Status: Discontinued
- Pricing model: ¥10/min. plus variable in-game charges, after ¥5,800 adapter purchase and ¥400 setup fee

The Mobile Adapter GB (Note: Japanese: モバイルアダプタGB, Hepburn: Mobairu Adaputa GB) was a short-lived peripheral developed by Nintendo that allowed the handheld Game Boy Color and Game Boy Advance consoles to connect to a mobile phone and utilize its cellular network. The accessory used a proprietary networking service called Mobile System GB (Note: モバイルシステムGB, Mobairu Shisutemu GB) operated by KDDI to exchange data. Following delays, the device and service launched in Japan on 27 January 2001. Together, they enabled online functionality for roughly 20 games, most notably Pokémon Crystal and Mobile Golf. Nintendo and Konami formed a joint venture, Mobile21, to create games that utilized the service.

Nintendo ultimately chose not to release the adapter outside Japan, citing international wireless incompatibilities and market differences. Its high costs and limited game compatibility hindered widespread adoption, with only 80,000 units sold in its first year. The service was discontinued after less than two years on 18 December 2002, marking an early, albeit unsuccessful, attempt at handheld online gaming. It would be succeeded on the company's later handheld systems by services such as Nintendo Wi-Fi Connection, Nintendo Network and Nintendo Switch Online.

== History ==
In September 1999, Nintendo announced the establishment of Mobile21, a joint venture with Konami intended to create new software for Nintendo's consoles that would utilize network connectivity, with Nintendo planning to release an adapter that would connect the Game Boy Color and cell phones the following year. The Mobile Adapter GB and the Mobile System GB service were revealed at the Nintendo Space World event in August 2000. At the time, Nintendo planned to release them alongside Pokémon Crystal, when it launched in December. The online interactions of the latest installment in the Pokémon video game series were highly promoted and was expected to be the "killer app" for the Mobile System GB service. However, the launch was pushed back to 27 January 2001. The device had a MSRP of ¥5,800. The device was promoted with advertisements featuring professional baseball player Kazuhiro Sasaki.

Initially, the Mobile Adapter GB was exclusively sold at mobile phone specialty stores, as Nintendo believed their employees could better explain the product and its functionality before purchase. However, starting on 11 May 2001, it became available at retailers carrying Game Boy titles, bundled with Mobile Golf at ¥5,800, the same price as the adapter alone. The price of the stand-alone adapter was cut to ¥3,800 on 19 July 2001. Each supported game offered different networking features, such as exchanging messages, competing in multiplayer games, submitting scores to online leaderboards, and downloading additional content.

The Mobile Adapter GB was not a commercial success, selling 80,000 units in its first year on the market. No new Mobile System GB subscribers were accepted after 1 June 2002, and the service was discontinued after less than two years on 18 December 2002. Users could continue to use the peer-to-peer functions of the Mobile Adapter GB that did not require connecting to the Mobile System GB service.

Nintendo revisited the concept of an online service for their handheld consoles with the launch of Nintendo Wi-Fi Connection on Nintendo DS in 2005.

== Technical overview ==
The Mobile Adapter GB peripheral was developed by Nintendo. One end of the adapter plugged into the link port of a Game Boy Color or Game Boy Advance, while the other connected to a mobile phone via a color-coded plastic box in the middle of the cable. Different models of the adapter were designed for various 2G network standards. At launch, two versions were available: a red cable for the PHS network operated by KDDI under its DDI Pocket brand and a blue cable for the PDC network. A third, yellow cable was later introduced for the cdmaOne network. A fourth, green cable intended for the PHS network operated by NTT Docomo and Astel was planned but never released.

The Mobile Adapter GB's features were provided through the Mobile System GB service. Connectivity was supplied by KDDI under its DION brand, which charged a one-time setup fee of ¥400 and a ¥10 per-minute connection fee. Additionally, Nintendo charged between ¥10 to 100 to access certain in-game features. Because the connected mobile phone would "call" into Nintendo’s servers, which were operated by Kyocera, users were also subject to their mobile network provider's standard calling charges.

The device came packaged with Mobile Trainer, a Game Boy Color Game Pak which was used to configure the player's connection, manage their account, exchange e-mail, and browse a limited selection of mobile websites.

Nintendo opted not to release the Mobile Adapter GB outside Japan. Journalists speculated reasons for this decision included conflicts in international wireless network standards, and the lack of infrastructure in other countries. Commenting from an American perspective, IGN noted that "billing and popularity of cellular phones are very different than in America, and [the Japanese] market is designed specifically for devices such as this. It might not be practical for Nintendo to release the device here...it's questionable whether enough young gamers would have a cellular phone to use it with."

== Supported games ==
Mobile System GB service homepage, accessed from the Mobile Trainer browser

In addition to the included Mobile Trainer software, the Mobile Adapter GB was supported by 21 games released between December 2000 and March 2002, consisting of the following 5 Game Boy Color (GBC) games and 16 Game Boy Advance (GBA) games:

- Daisenryaku For Game Boy Advance (GBA, 2001)
- Doraemon: Midori no Wakusei Doki Doki Daikyūshutsu! (GBA, 2001)
- EX Monopoly (GBA, 2001)
- Exciting Bass (GBA, 2001)
- Game Boy Wars 3 (GBC, 2001)
- Hello Kitty: Happy House (GBC, 2002)
- JGTO Kōnin: Golfmaster Mobile (GBA, 2001)
- Kinniku Banzuke: Kongō-kun no Daibōken! (GBA, 2001)
- Mail de Cute (GBA, 2002)
- Mario Kart Advance (GBA, 2001)
- Mobile Golf (GBC, 2001)
- Mobile Pro Yakyū: Kantoku no Saihai (GBA, 2001)
- Monster Guardians (GBA, 2001)
- Morita Shōgi Advance (GBA, 2001)
- Napoleon (GBA, 2001)
- Net de Get Minigames @100 (GBC, 2001)
- Play Novel Silent Hill (GBA, 2001)
- Pokémon Crystal (GBC, 2000)
- Starcom: Star Communicator (GBA, 2001)
- Zen Nihon GT Senshuken (GBA, 2001)
- Zero-Tours (GBA, 2001)

Some games that were planned to use the adapter, such as The Legend of Zelda: Oracle of Seasons and Oracle of Ages, (GBC, 2001), Golden Sun (GBA, 2001), and Animal Crossing (GameCube/GBA, 2001), dropped support for the accessory during development. Others, including Beatmania GB Net Jam (GBC) and Baketsu Daisakusen (GBA), were never released.

== See also ==
- List of Game Boy accessories
- Wireless game adapter
