= Napoleon (video game) =

2001 video game

- Japanese box art
- Developer: Genki
- Publisher: Nintendo
- Platform: Game Boy Advance
- Release: JP: March 21, 2001; FR: November 21, 2001
- Genre: Real-time strategy
- Modes: Single-player, multiplayer

Napoleon (Note: Japanese: ナポレオン, Hepburn: Naporeon)^{FRA} is a real-time strategy video game developed by Genki and published by Nintendo for the Game Boy Advance. The game was a launch title for the handheld system in Japan. The game was also published in France under the title L'Aigle de Guerre (lit. "The Eagle of War"). The Japanese version of the game was compatible with the Mobile Adapter GB until December 14, 2002. An unofficial fan English translation patch for the game was released on December 31, 2018.

In the game's Story Mode, players play Napoleon Bonaparte who leads the revolutionary army into battle against the British. Set in the late 18th century, Napoleon's story is told in Fire Emblem fashion via strategic maps and character dialogue. However, the game takes many liberties with historical accuracy, such as Napoleon fighting man-eating ogres and abominable snowmen. The objectives for the missions vary slightly, but the basic idea is to send out units, defeat the enemy and take over the opponent's stronghold.

== Reception ==
Famicom Tsūshin scored the game a 27 out of 40.

== Notes ==
Known in France as L'Aigle de Guerre (lit. "The Eagle of War")
