= Ucchannanchan no Honō no Challenger: Denryū Iraira Bō =

1997 video game

- Developer: Yuke's
- Publisher: Hudson
- Platform: Nintendo 64
- Release: JP: December 19, 1997
- Genre: Puzzle
- Modes: Single-player, multiplayer

Ucchannanchan no Honō no Challenger: Denryū Iraira Bō (ウッチャンナンチャンの炎のチャレンジャー 電流イライラ棒) is a puzzle video game for the Nintendo 64 released only in Japan in December 1997. The title translates to Ucchannanchan's Flaming Challenger: Irritating Electric Stick. The game features six increasingly difficult wire mazes which the player has to guide a stick through without touching the walls. The player is awarded crowns from bronze to platinum depending on how fast they can beat each stage. The game does not feature any ending screen or credits.

It is based on a segment of the Japanese game show ja; the Neo Geo game The Irritating Maze and the PlayStation game Irritating Stick are based on the same show.

== Reception ==
Reception

Review scores
Publication	Score
Jeuxvideo.com	7/20
N64 Magazine	65%
Total!	5/5
N64 Pro	60%

Nintendo Life wrote: "[...] while it may not have the ground-breaking qualities of Super Mario 64 or the graphical prowess of Banjo-Kazooie, it is nevertheless fun, challenging and, above all, different – which is more than can be said for many games today."
