= Irritating Stick =

1998 video game

- North American box art
- Developer: Saurus
- Publisher: Jaleco Entertainment
- Platform: PlayStation
- Release: JP: March 19, 1998; NA: February 4, 1999
- Genre: Puzzle video game
- Modes: Single-player, multiplayer

Irritating Stick (Note: Known in Japan as Ucchannanchan no Honō no Challenger: Denryū Iraira Bō Returns (Japanese: ウッチャンナンチャンの炎のチャレンジャー 電流イライラ棒リターンズ; "Ucchannanchan's Challengers on Fire: Irritating Electric Stick Returns")) is a 1998 puzzle video game developed by Saurus and published by Jaleco Entertainment for the PlayStation. It was first released in Japan on March 19, 1998, and in North America on February 4, 1999. Based on a segment from the Japanese game show Ucchannanchan no Honō no Challenger: Kore ga Dekitara Hyakuman En, the player must guide a stick through increasingly difficult wire mazes without touching its walls.

A demo of the game was included on the Jampack Winter '98 demo disc. Similar titles based on the same game show, The Irritating Maze and Ucchannanchan no Honō no Challenger: Denryū Iraira Bō, were released for the Neo Geo and Nintendo 64 around the same time respectively.

== Gameplay ==
In Irritating Stick, the object of each level is to guide a metal stick through a wire maze within a time limit, while avoiding touching its walls. If the stick makes contact with the walls, the controller vibrates violently, and the player must restart from the last checkpoint. Levels may also include different obstacles, such as rotating spike wheels, slot machines, and moving robots.

== Reception ==
Reception

Aggregate score
Aggregator	Score
GameRankings	39%

Review scores
Publication	Score
Electronic Gaming Monthly	5/10, 2/10, 4.5/10, 1/10
Famitsu	29/40
GameFan	59% (Note: Three critics of GameFan gave the game each a score of 50, 81, and 45.)
GameSpot	3/10
IGN	5.5/10
Official U.S. PlayStation Magazine	3/5

The game received generally unfavorable reviews according to the review aggregation website GameRankings. It was voted the #1 worst game name of all time by GameRevolution. In Japan, however, Famitsu gave it a score of 29 out of 40.
