= Master of Illusion (video game) =

2006 video game

- Developers: Eighting; Tenyo
- Publisher: Nintendo
- Composer: Akira Fujiwara
- Platforms: Nintendo DS; DSiWare
- Release: JP: November 16, 2006; NA: November 26, 2007; AU: December 13, 2007; EU: March 14, 2008
- Genres: Simulation, non-game
- Mode: Single-player

Master of Illusion, known in Europe as Magic Made Fun: Perform Tricks That Will Amaze Your Friends! and in Japan as Magic Encyclopedia (マジック大全, Majikku Taizen), is a magic video game developed by Tenyo and Eighting and published by Nintendo for the Nintendo DS. It was released in Japan on November 16, 2006, November 26, 2007 in North America and March 14, 2008 in Europe. Around 9 of its magic tricks were released as separate pieces of DSiWare. It was a collaboration between Nintendo and Japanese magic company Tenyo.

The packaging of the game includes a full deck of Nintendo playing cards (manufactured by Tenyo) so the player can practice the card illusions they had learned while playing the game outside of the portable system.

== Gameplay ==
One of the magic tricks featured called Two Candles makes use of the built-in Nintendo DS microphone.

Master of Illusion puts the player in the role of an illusionist who must learn and perfect his tricks. The game has three basic modes: Solo Magic, Magic Show and Magic Training. The first one is a compilation of varied minigames, the other two being the "meat of the game", or the important part, according to reviewers. In both, the objective is to perform tricks and earn points, which grant the player more tricks and illusions. The system has a limit for the points a player can earn in a full day, though this can be bypassed by changing the date on the Nintendo DS system.

== DSiWare releases ==
A number of Master of Illusion tricks collections have been released for the DSiWare download service, including tricks taken from the original Nintendo DS game, as well as new tricks. The DSiWare series is entitled Master of Illusion Express in North America and Australia and A Little Bit of… Magic Made Fun in Europe. All versions cost 200 Nintendo DSi points each.

Funny Face was released in Japan on December 24, 2008, in North America on April 5, 2009, and in the PAL region on May 1. In this illusion, the player's Nintendo DSi "guesses" which card they pulled out "by drawing a Smiley face", and also includes a bonus magic trick called "Vanishing Card" that consists of five random cards and picture one of them in player's mind, while player's DSi figures it out and makes it vanish. Vanishing Card is included with most other DSiWare tricks in this range.

Shuffle Games was released in Japan on December 24, 2008, in North America on April 13, 2009, and in the PAL region on May 15. This illusion deals with an audience member and the host trying to figure out what the audience member is thinking. The game also features the vanishing card trick.

Deep Psyche was released in Japan on December 24, 2008, North America on April 20, 2009 and in the PAL region on May 8. The titular illusion deals with a series of pointed questions revealing the startling truth. All questions have answers involving numbers which are added up and will magically result in a big number. It also includes Today's Special, which deals with showing the date set on the DSi system clock, hence this DSiWare asks if the system clock is correct when the players use it for the first time.

Mind Probe was released in Japan on April 1, 2009, in North America on November 30, 2009 and in the PAL region on December 25. This illusion deals with an audience member writing down a favorite or least favorite item and the DSi guessing what it is.

Matchmaker was released in Japan on April 22, 2009, in the PAL region on December 4, and in North America on December 14. This illusion is where the players have two photos to determine the person's exact age and another illusion deals with having to know another person's favorite dates or food that are similar to the host.

Psychic Camera was released in Japan on May 27, 2009, in the PAL region on December 18, and in North America on December 28. This illusion allows the host to see exactly what playing card or symbol player's friend is thinking of by taking their photo.

== See also ==
- Love Tester
- Daigasso! Band Brothers
